= Mount Spencer (California) =

Mountain in California, United States

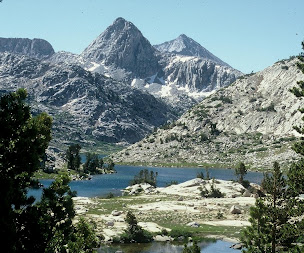
- Mount Spencer (center left) from Evolution Lake

Highest point
- Elevation: 12,431 ft (3,789 m) NGVD 29
- Prominence: 221 ft (67 m)
- Coordinates: 37°09′19″N 118°40′54″W

Geography
- Location within California Location within the United States
- Location: Kings Canyon National Park; Fresno County, California, U.S.
- Parent range: Sierra Nevada, Evolution Region

Climbing
- First ascent: August 20, 1921 by Robert M. Prince, George J. young, H.W. Hill, and Peter Frandsen
- Easiest route: Scramble from the southeast saddle, class 2

Mount Spencer is a 12,431 feet (3,789 m) peak in the Sierra Nevada, in Kings Canyon National Park and Fresno County, California.

It is named for Herbert Spencer, an English philosopher and prominent scientist in the field of evolution who coined the term "survival of the fittest." Other nearby mountains in the Evolution Group include Mount Darwin, Mount Mendel, Mount Fiske, Mount Haeckel, Mount Huxley, Mount Wallace, and Mount Lamarck. The area around the peaks, known as the Evolution Region, includes Evolution Basin and Evolution Valley.

The peak offers a view from Evolution Lake and the John Muir Trail.

== Climate ==
According to the Köppen climate classification system, Mount Spencer is located in an alpine climate zone. Most weather fronts originate in the Pacific Ocean, and travel east toward the Sierra Nevada mountains. As fronts approach, they are forced upward by the peaks, causing them to drop their moisture in the form of rain or snowfall onto the range (orographic lift). Precipitation runoff from this mountain drains to Evolution Creek which is a San Joaquin River tributary.

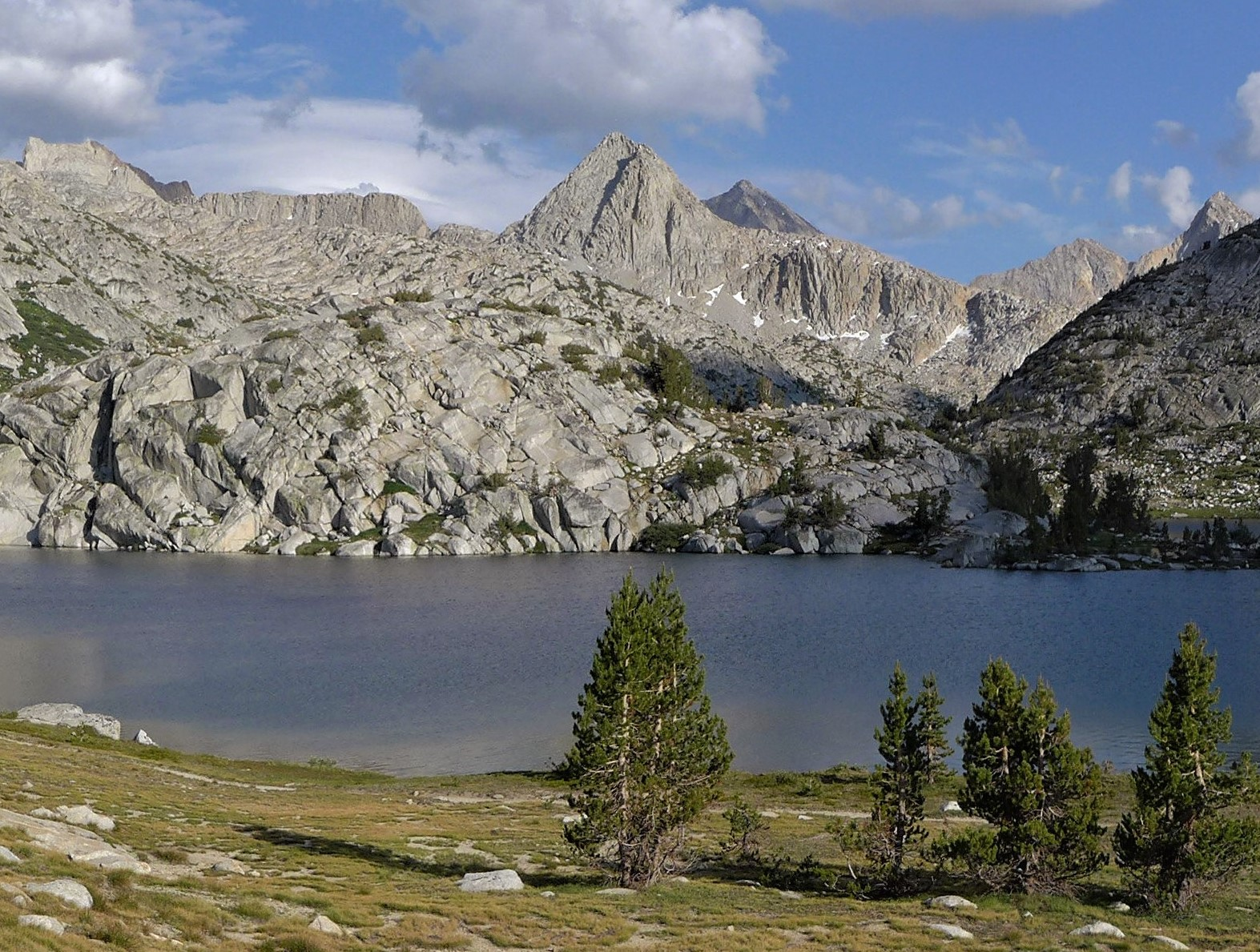
Mount Spencer
