= Mount Huxley (California) =

Mountain in California

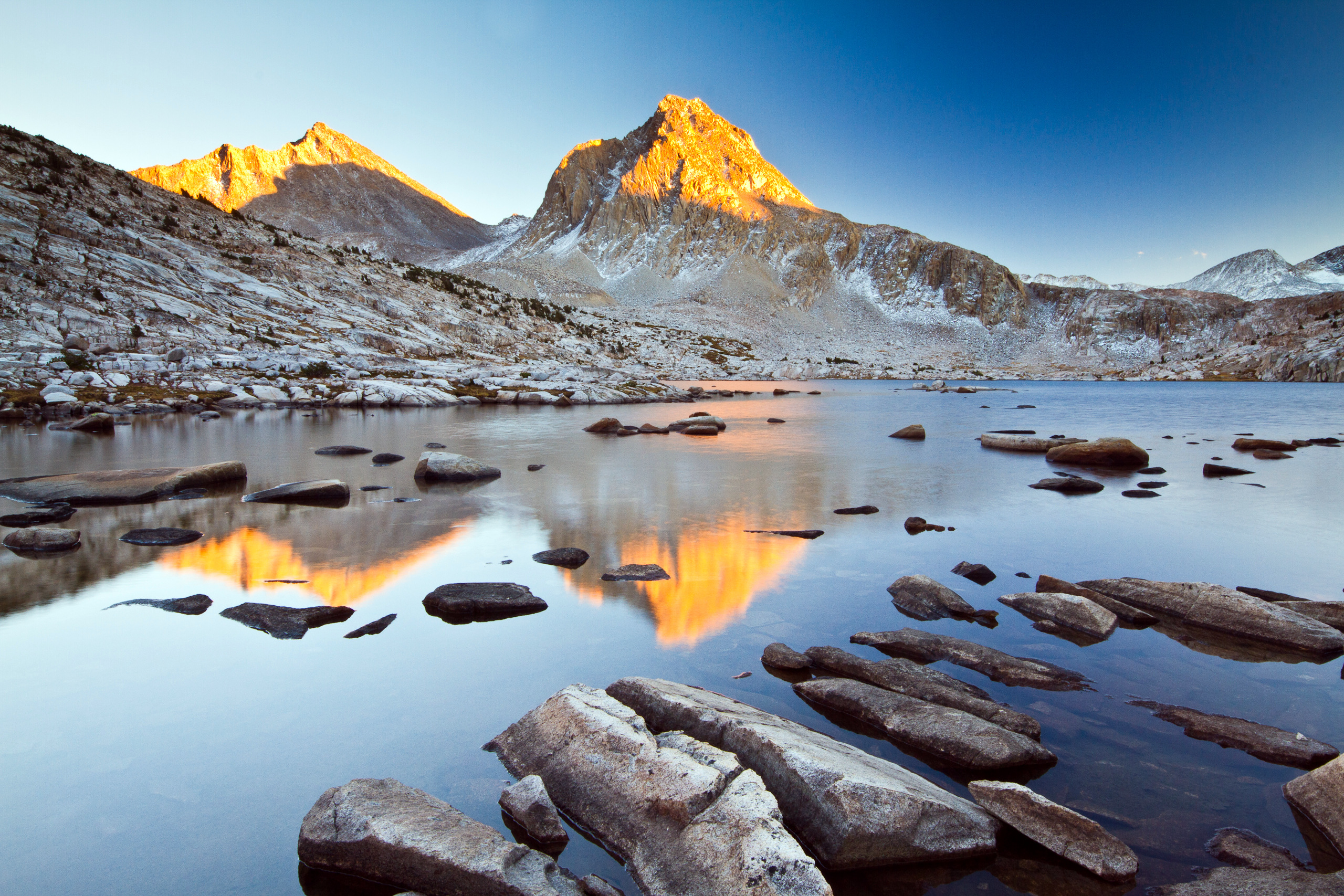
- From Sapphire Lake

Highest point
- Elevation: 13,092 ft (3,990 m) NAVD 88
- Prominence: 366 ft (112 m)
- Listing: Sierra Peaks Section
- Coordinates: 37°08′10″N 118°40′58″W

Geography
- Location within California Location within the United States
- Location: Fresno County, California, US
- Parent range: Sierra Nevada
- Topo map: USGS Mount Darwin

Mount Huxley is a 13,092-foot (3,990 m) mountain in the Sierra Nevada, in Fresno County. It is on the Goddard Divide in Kings Canyon National Park and rises above the Evolution Basin. Other nearby mountains in the group include Mount Darwin, Mount Fiske, Mount Haeckel, Mount Mendel, Mount Spencer, Mount Wallace, and Mount Lamarck. The area around the peaks, known as the Evolution Region, includes Evolution Basin, Evolution Valley, Evolution Meadow and Evolution Creek.

== History ==
Theodore S. Solomons named a series of mountains for six of the major exponents of the theory of evolution. Mount Huxley is named for English biologist and anthropologist Thomas Henry Huxley who specialized in comparative anatomy. He is known as "Darwin's Bulldog".

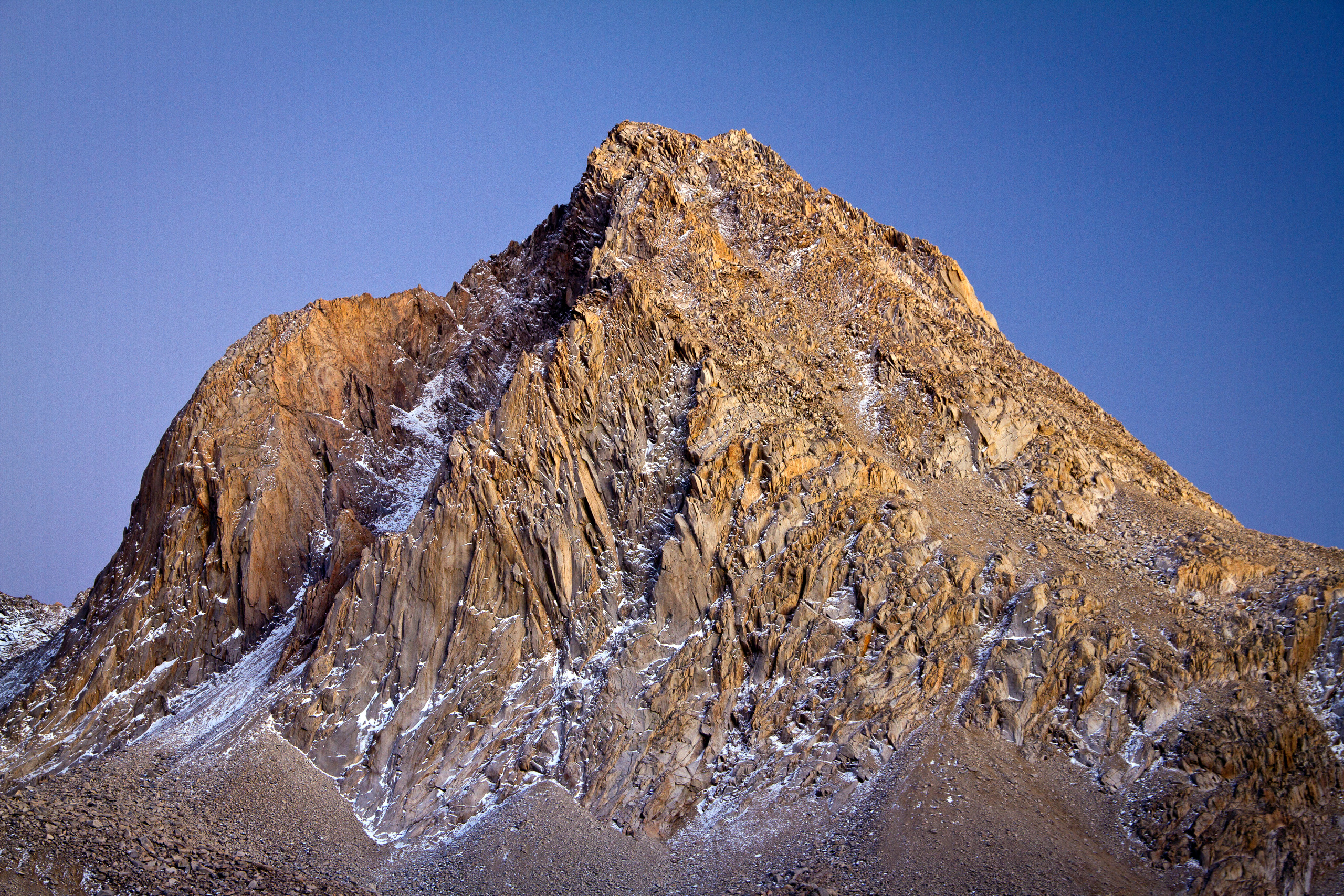
Mt. Huxley
