= Mustonen =

Mustonen is a Finnish surname. Notable people with the surname include:

- Aleksi Mustonen (b. 1995) – Finnish ice hockey player
- Andres Mustonen (b. 1953) – Estonian conductor and violinist
- Atte Mustonen (b. 1988) – Finnish racing driver
- Helvi Mustonen (1947–2025) – Finnish artist
- Henrik Mustonen (b. 1990) – Finnish squash player
- Janne Mustonen (1901–1964), Finnish politician
- Joel Mustonen (b. 1992) – Finnish ice-hockey player
- Kaija Mustonen (b. 1941) – Finnish speed skater
- Leo Mustonen (c. 1920-1942) – Finnish-American pilot
- Liisa Mustonen (b. 1969) – Finnish film actress
- Markus Mustonen – Swedish musician
- Olli Mustonen (b. 1967) – Finnish pianist, composer, conductor
- Paavo Mustonen (b. 1986) – Cook Islands footballer
- Pasi Mustonen (b. 1960) – Finnish ice hockey coach
- Risto Mustonen (1875–1941) – Finnish wrestler
- Sami Mustonen (b. 1977) – Finnish skier
- Sara Mustonen (1962–1979) – Finnish skier
- Sara Mustonen (b. 1971) – Swedish cyclist
- Taneli Mustonen (b. 1978) – Finnish film director
