= Mendel Glacier =

Glacier in California, United States

- Location within California
- Type: Mountain glacier
- Location: Kings Canyon National Park, Fresno County, California, United States
- Coordinates: 37°10′42″N 118°40′58″W
- Length: .10 mi (0.16 km)
- Terminus: Talus
- Status: Retreating

Mendel Glacier is on the north side of Mount Mendel in the Sierra Nevada, California.

The name is commonly used; however, the name is not recognized by the United States Geological Survey in the Geographic Names Information System. Mendel Glacier is .35 miles (0.56 km) north of Darwin Glacier at 12,500 feet (3,800 m) above sea level.

The middle and lower portions of the glacier are covered with rock debris.

A US Army plane crashed above or into the glacier in 1942 with four airmen on board during a navigation training mission.

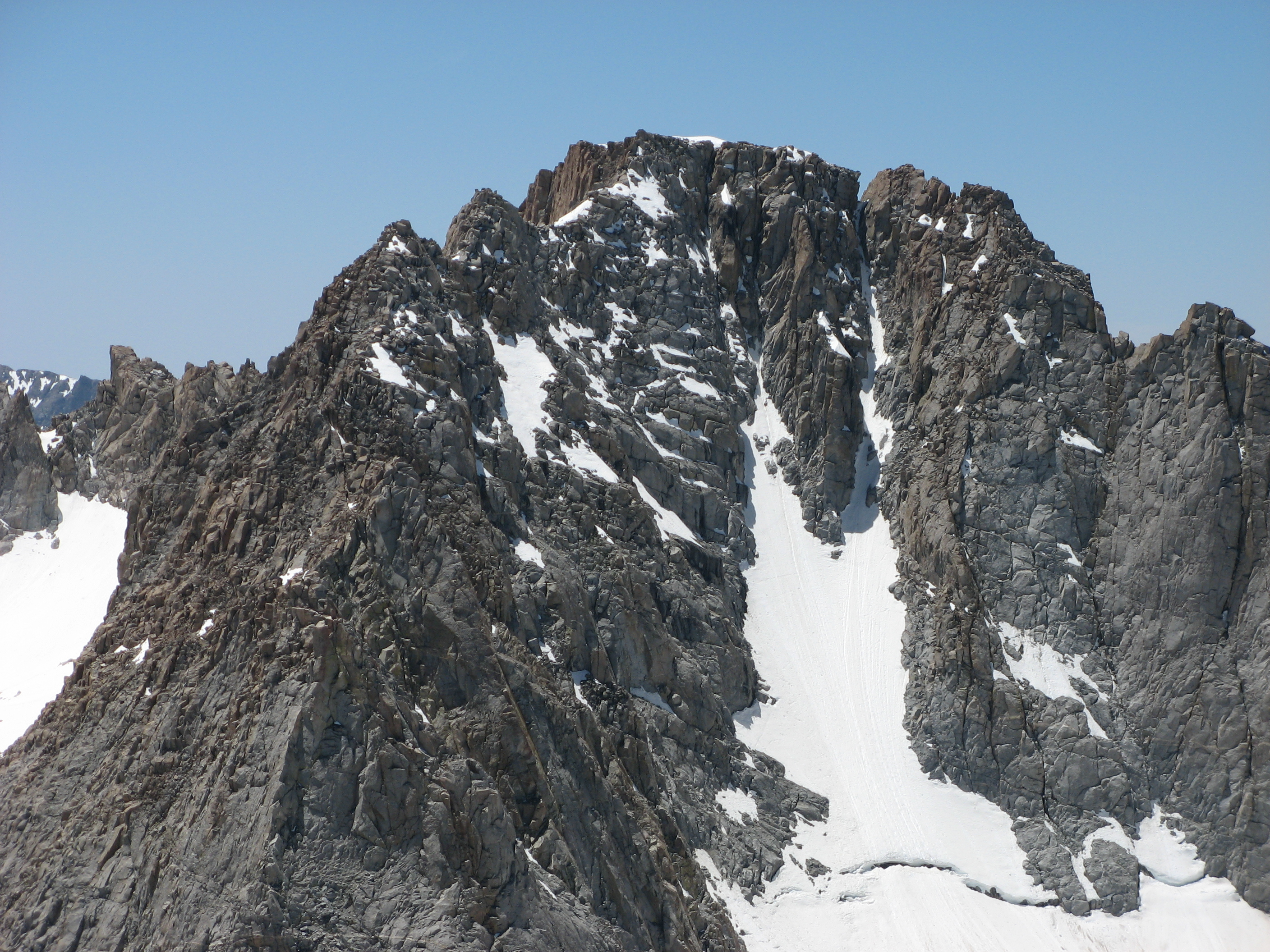
Upper Mendel Glacier July, 2006

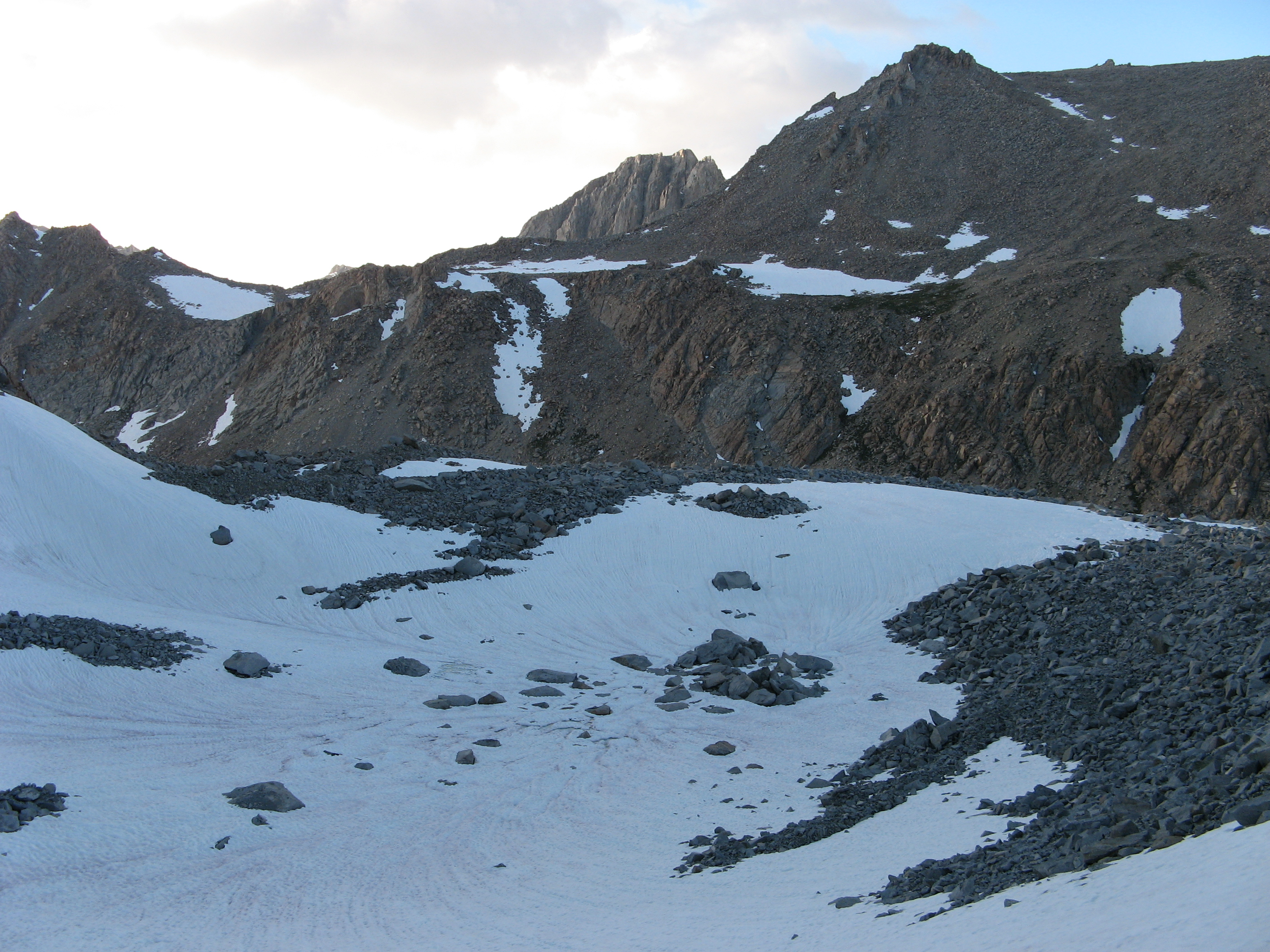
Mendel Glacier Terminus July, 2006

== See also ==
- List of glaciers in the United States
