= Mount Mendel =

Mountain in California, United States

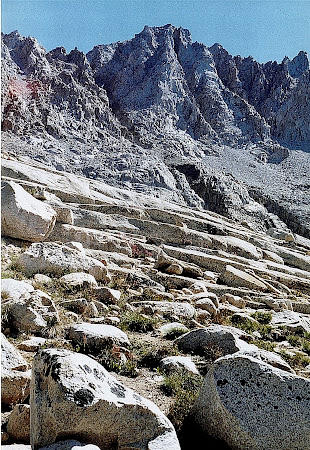
- Mount Mendel from Evolution Lake

Highest point
- Elevation: 13,716 ft (4,181 m) NAVD 88
- Prominence: 550 ft (168 m)
- Listing: Sierra Peaks Section; Western States Climbers Emblem peak
- Coordinates: 37°10′30″N 118°40′56″W

Geography
- Location within California Location within the United States
- Location: Kings Canyon National Park, Fresno County, California, U.S.
- Parent range: Sierra Nevada, Evolution Region

Climbing
- First ascent: July 15, 1930 Jules Eichorn, Glen Dawson and John Olmstead
- Easiest route: Exposed scramble, class 3

Mount Mendel is a peak in Fresno County, California. It is in Kings Canyon National Park in the Evolution Region, of the Sierra Nevada and adjacent to Mount Darwin which is on the Sierra crest.

== History ==
Theodore S. Solomons and E. C. Bonner of the United States Geological Survey named a series of mountains for the six major exponents of the theory of evolution. Mount Mendel is named for, Gregor Mendel, an Augustinian friar, who is known as the "father of modern genetics". Other nearby mountains in the group include Mount Darwin, Mount Fiske, Mount Haeckel, Mount Huxley, Mount Spencer, Mount Wallace, and Mount Lamarck. The area around the peaks, known as the Evolution Region, includes Evolution Basin, Evolution Valley, Evolution Meadow and Evolution Creek.

== Climbing ==
There are several class 3 and class 4 routes available, however, Mount Mendel is best known for having two of the hardest ice climbs in the High Sierra on its North Face. Two of the documented ice climbs are "Ice Nine" (IV, class 5+, AI4 or WI5) and "The Mendel Couloir", (III class 5.6, AI2 or WI3). See the article Grade (climbing).
