= Ernest Glenn Munn =

US Army Air Force officer

Ernest Glenn Munn was a United States Army Air Forces aviation cadet who was reported missing after a plane crash on November 18, 1942. His body was found in August 2007, on the Mendel Glacier in the Sierra Nevada mountain range, in Sequoia and Kings Canyon National Parks in California.

Munn's aircraft, Beech 18 AT-7 Navigator #41-21079, was based at Mather Field in Sacramento, California. It was on a navigation training mission when it disappeared. It was piloted by 2nd Lt. William Gamber. Other crew members included Cadets John M. Mortenson and Leo Mustonen.

In 1947, four UC Berkeley students found the wreck. Bill Bond, one of the students, guided an Air-Sea recovery team from Hamilton Field in Marin County to the wreck site in late September 1947. Engine identification tags confirmed that the wreckage belonged to #41-21079. No bodies were recovered.

In 1948, a team of soldiers from Fort Lewis, Washington, led by Captain Roy F. Sulzbacher from the Presidio in San Francisco, visited to the glacier but were unable to recover any remains.

On October 16, 2005, two hikers discovered a glacier-entombed corpse. The mummified remains were recovered later in the same month by a team from JPAC and transported to the U.S. Army Central Identification Laboratory (CILHI) in Hawaii where a DNA test conducted against family reference samples volunteered by the maternal relatives of the crew. During February 2006, the remains were officially identified as Leo Mustonen.

In August 2007, another frozen body was found in the area of the wreck by Peter Stekel, an author conducting research for a book he was writing about the missing airplane. The airman was wearing a flight suit with blonde, wavy hair and a wool tattered sweater. Nearby was an unopened parachute.On March 10, 2008 the US military confirmed by DNA test these remains belonged to Ernest Munn.

Munn was buried May 17, 2008, in the family plot in Holly Memorial Gardens in Pleasant Grove, Ohio. This plot overlooks the former gas station which was one of the places where he spent time while growing up, as well as the current home of his sister, Jeannie Pyle, and the long-time home of his parents, Joe and Sadie ("Mamee") Munn.

He was survived by all three of his sisters, Sara Zeyer of Adena, Ohio; Jeannie Pyle of Pleasant Grove; and Lois ("Peg") Shriver from Pittsburgh, and numerous nephews and nieces and their families.
