= Mount Darwin (California) =

Mountain in the Sierra Nevada, California

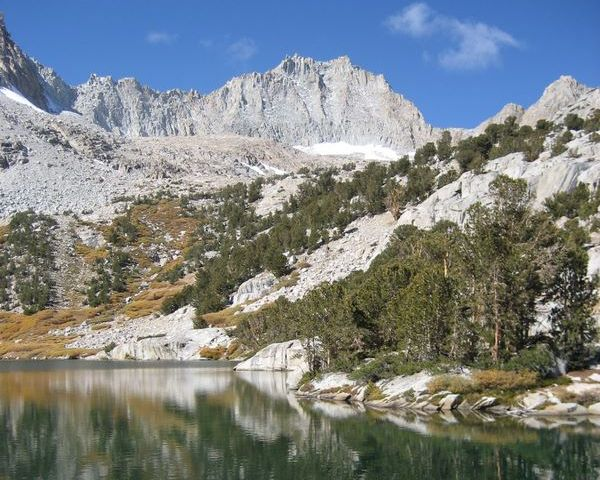
- Mount Darwin above Midnight Lake.

Highest point
- Elevation: 13,837 ft (4,218 m) NAVD 88
- Prominence: 1,871 ft (570 m)
- Listing: North America highest peaks 71st; US highest major peaks 53rd; California highest major peaks 8th; SPS Emblem peak; Western States Climbers Star peak
- Coordinates: 37°10′01″N 118°40′21″W

Naming
- Etymology: Charles Darwin

Geography
- Location within California
- Location: Fresno and Inyo counties, California
- Country: United States of America
- State: California
- County: Fresno
- Parent range: Sierra Nevada, Evolution region
- Topo map: USGS Mount Darwin

Climbing
- First ascent: 1908 by Ernest Clayton Andrews and Willard D. Johnson
- Easiest route: West Face, exposed scramble, class 3 with summit block class 4

Mount Darwin is a flat-topped mountain in the Sierra Nevada, on the border of between Fresno and Inyo counties in Kings Canyon National Park and the John Muir Wilderness of California.

== History ==
Two Australian geologists, Ernest Clayton Andrews and Willard D. Johnson, made the first recorded ascent on August 12, 1908.

The modern name of the mountain was given to it in 1895 by Theodore S. Solomons and E. C. Bonner of the United States Geological Survey as part of a series of mountains named for the six major exponents of the theory of evolution. Mount Darwin is named for the naturalist, Charles Darwin. Other nearby mountains in the Evolution Group include Mount Mendel, Mount Fiske, Mount Haeckel, Mount Huxley, Mount Spencer, Mount Wallace, and Mount Lamarck. The area around the peaks, known as the Evolution Region, includes Evolution Basin and Evolution Valley.

Nearby landmarks include Darwin Glacier and Darwin Canyon.

A similar exercise in naming mountains after naturalists and other late nineteenth century proponents of evolution theory was carried out at the West Coast Range in Tasmania, Australia. In contrast, Mount Darwin in Tierra del Fuego was given its name during the voyage of the Beagle by captain Robert FitzRoy to celebrate Darwin's 25th birthday on 12 February 1834.

== Climate ==
Climate data for Mount Darwin 37.1676 N, 118.6747 W, Elevation: 13,245 ft (4,037 m) (1991–2020 normals)
Month	Jan	Feb	Mar	Apr	May	Jun	Jul	Aug	Sep	Oct	Nov	Dec	Year
Mean daily maximum °F (°C)	26.9 (−2.8)	25.6 (−3.6)	28.4 (−2.0)	31.6 (−0.2)	38.9 (3.8)	48.5 (9.2)	55.1 (12.8)	54.4 (12.4)	49.4 (9.7)	41.3 (5.2)	33.4 (0.8)	27.0 (−2.8)	38.4 (3.5)
Daily mean °F (°C)	16.3 (−8.7)	14.5 (−9.7)	16.8 (−8.4)	19.7 (−6.8)	26.9 (−2.8)	36.2 (2.3)	43.2 (6.2)	42.5 (5.8)	37.2 (2.9)	29.8 (−1.2)	22.5 (−5.3)	16.5 (−8.6)	26.8 (−2.9)
Mean daily minimum °F (°C)	5.7 (−14.6)	3.3 (−15.9)	5.3 (−14.8)	7.8 (−13.4)	14.8 (−9.6)	24.0 (−4.4)	31.3 (−0.4)	30.6 (−0.8)	25.0 (−3.9)	18.3 (−7.6)	11.6 (−11.3)	6.1 (−14.4)	15.3 (−9.3)
Average precipitation inches (mm)	8.19 (208)	6.77 (172)	6.02 (153)	3.77 (96)	1.93 (49)	0.52 (13)	0.38 (9.7)	0.25 (6.4)	0.36 (9.1)	1.92 (49)	2.68 (68)	7.55 (192)	40.34 (1,025.2)
Source: PRISM Climate Group

== See also ==
- List of mountain peaks of California
