= Clyde Spires =

Mountain in California, United States

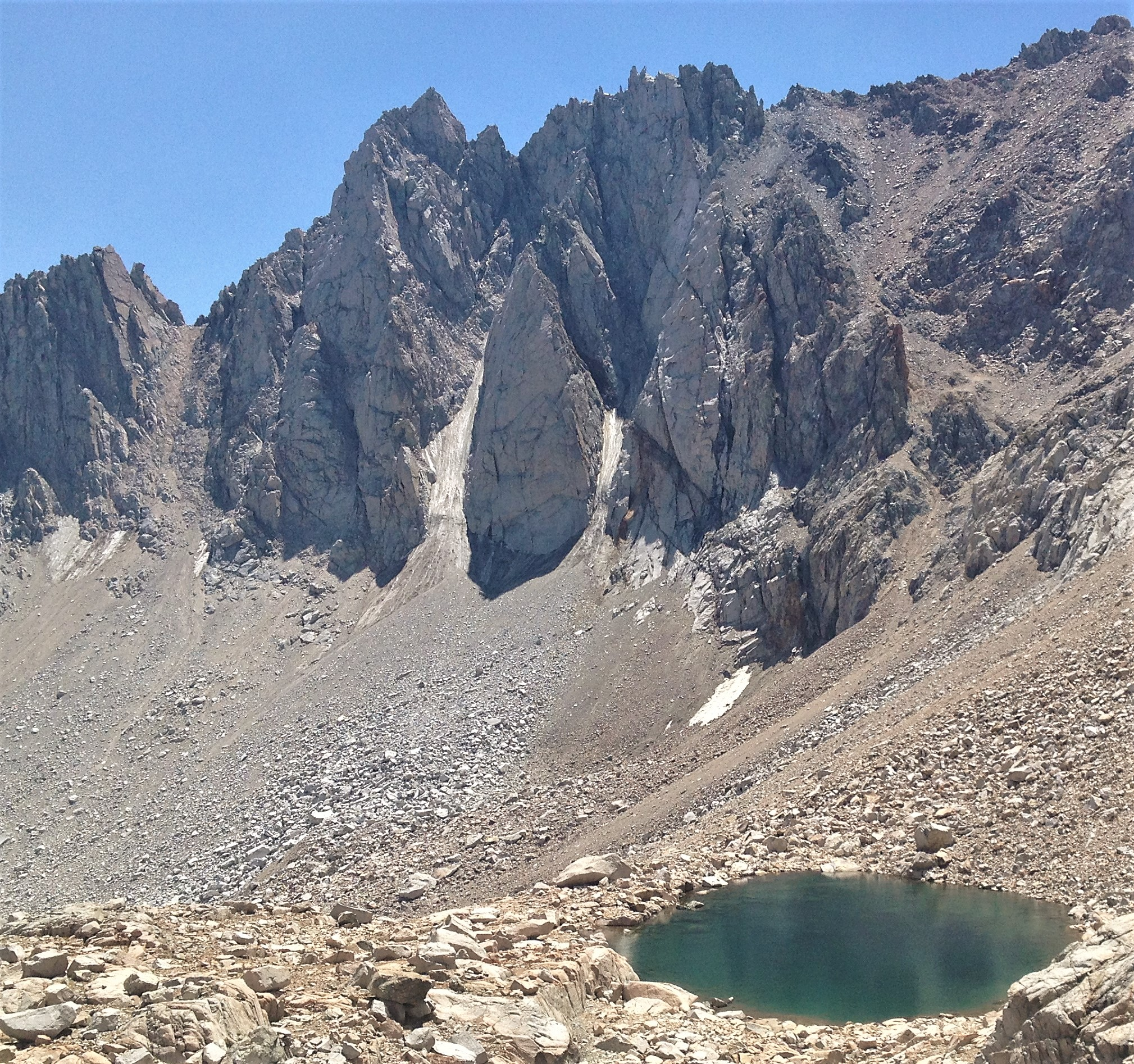
- North aspect

Highest point
- Elevation: 13,267 ft (4,044 m)
- Prominence: 80 ft (24 m)
- Parent peak: Mount Wallace (13,377 ft)
- Isolation: 0.50 mi (0.80 km)
- Coordinates: 37°08′24″N 118°38′54″W

Naming
- Etymology: Norman Clyde

Geography
- Location within California Location within the United States
- Location: Kings Canyon National Park; Fresno County / Inyo County; California, U.S.
- Parent range: Sierra Nevada
- Topo map: USGS Mount Darwin

Geology
- Rock age: Cretaceous
- Mountain type: Fault block
- Rock type: Granite

Climbing
- First ascent: 1933
- Easiest route: class 4

Clyde Spires is a 13,267-foot-elevation (4,044-meter) mountain summit located on the crest of the Sierra Nevada mountain range in California, United States. It is situated on the boundary shared by Kings Canyon National Park with John Muir Wilderness, and along the common border of Fresno County with Inyo County. It is 20 miles (32 km) west of the community of Big Pine, and 0.5 miles (0.80 km) southeast of Mount Wallace, which is the nearest higher neighbor. The west spire is slightly higher than the east spire. Topographic relief is significant as the spires rise 1,665 feet (507 meters) above Echo Lake in 0.38 miles (0.61 km).

== History ==
The first ascent of the spires was made July 22, 1933, by Norman Clyde, Jules Eichorn and Ted Waller, who were members of the Sierra Club. They named the landform for Norman Clyde (1885–1972), the leader of the group and legendary mountaineer credited with 130 first ascents, most of which were in the Sierra Nevada. The toponym has been officially adopted by the United States Board on Geographic Names.

== Climate ==
Clyde Spires is located in an alpine climate zone. Most weather fronts originate in the Pacific Ocean, and travel east toward the Sierra Nevada mountains. As fronts approach, they are forced upward by the peaks (orographic lift), causing them to drop their moisture in the form of rain or snowfall onto the range. Precipitation runoff from this geographic feature drains north to Bishop Creek, and south into Middle Fork Kings River.

== Gallery ==
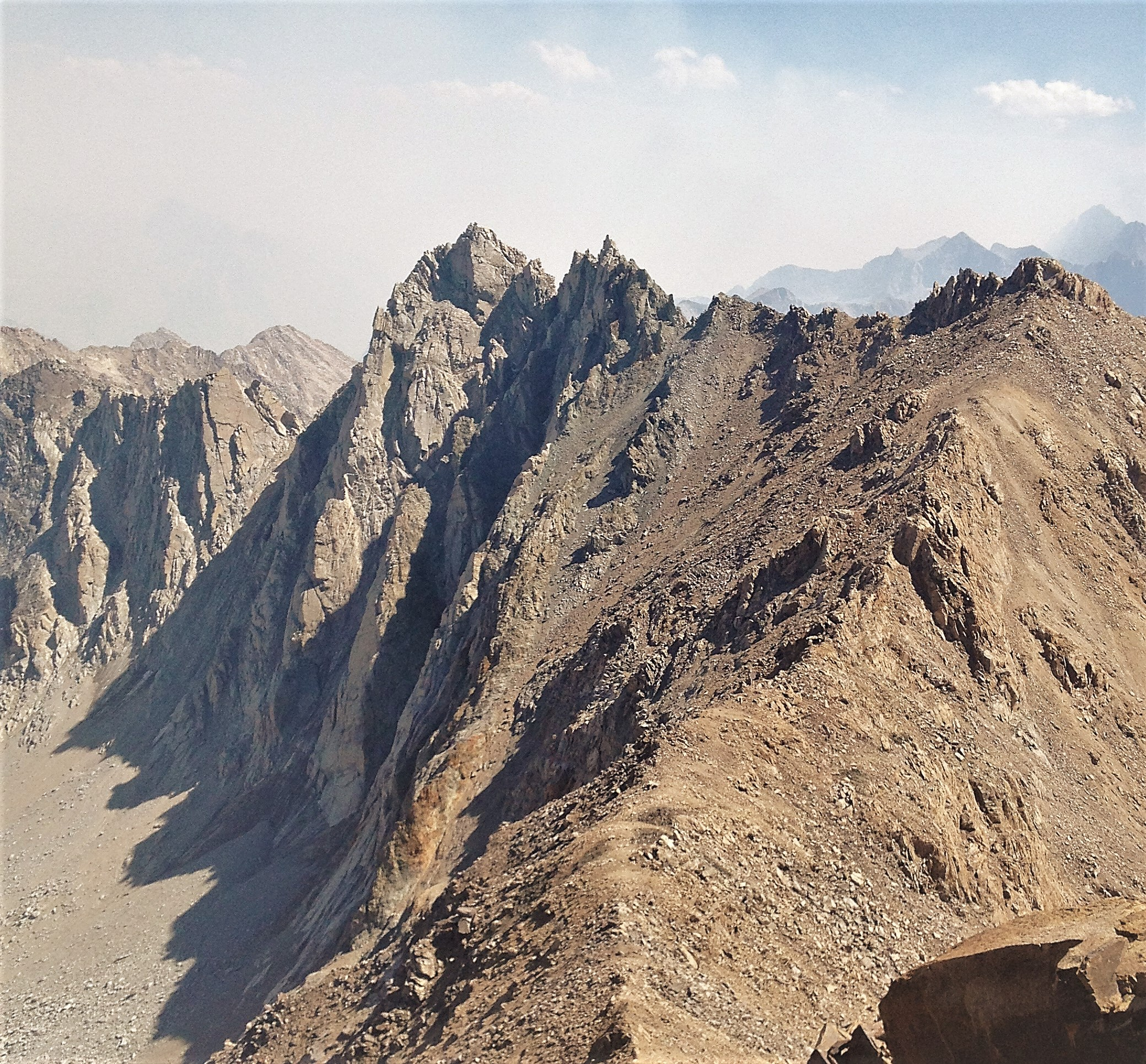
Clyde Spires from Mt. Wallace

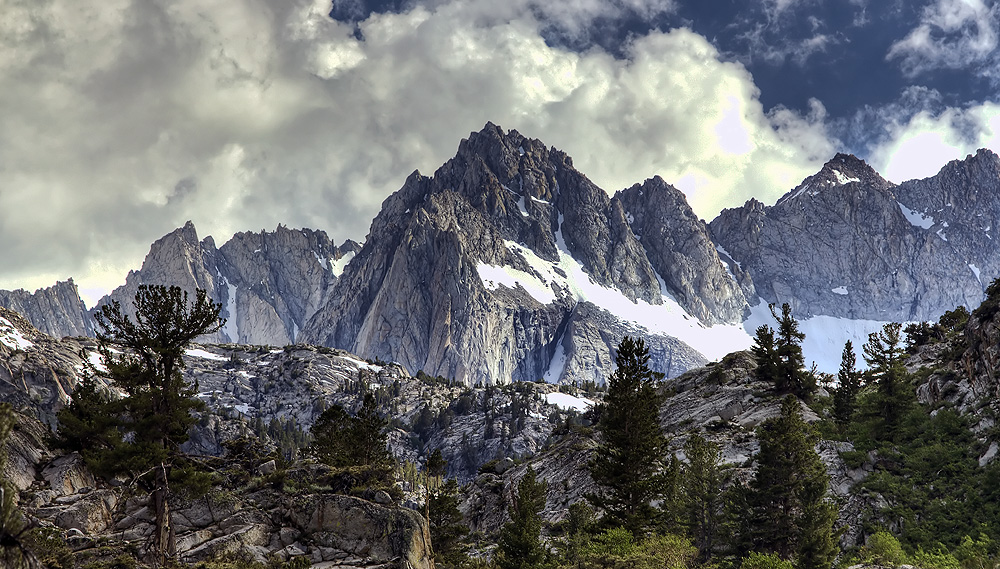
Picture Peak (centered), Clyde Spires to left.

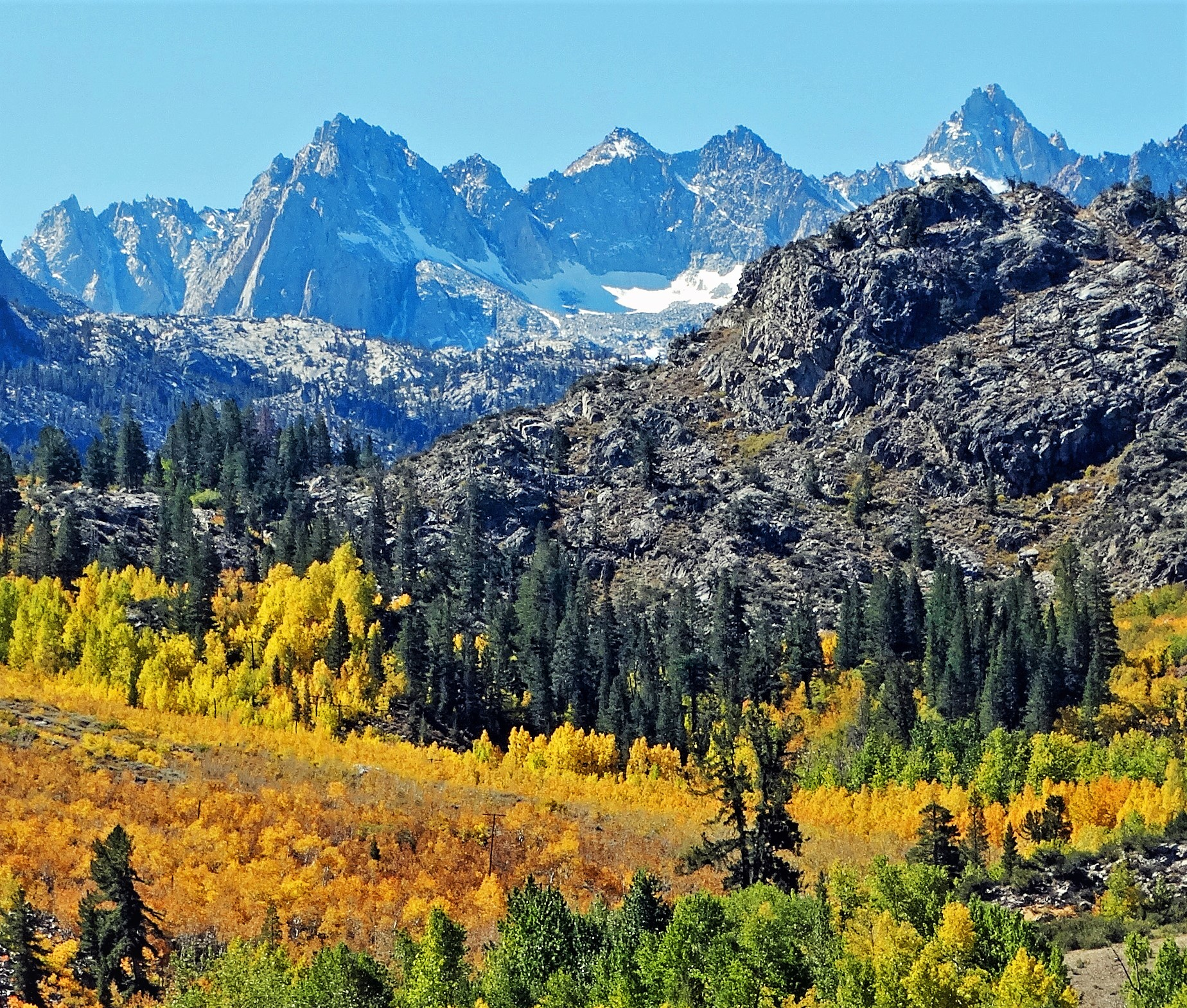
Clyde Spires far left, Picture Peak (left),
Mt. Wallace's summit centered (behind ridge), Mt. Haeckel in upper right.

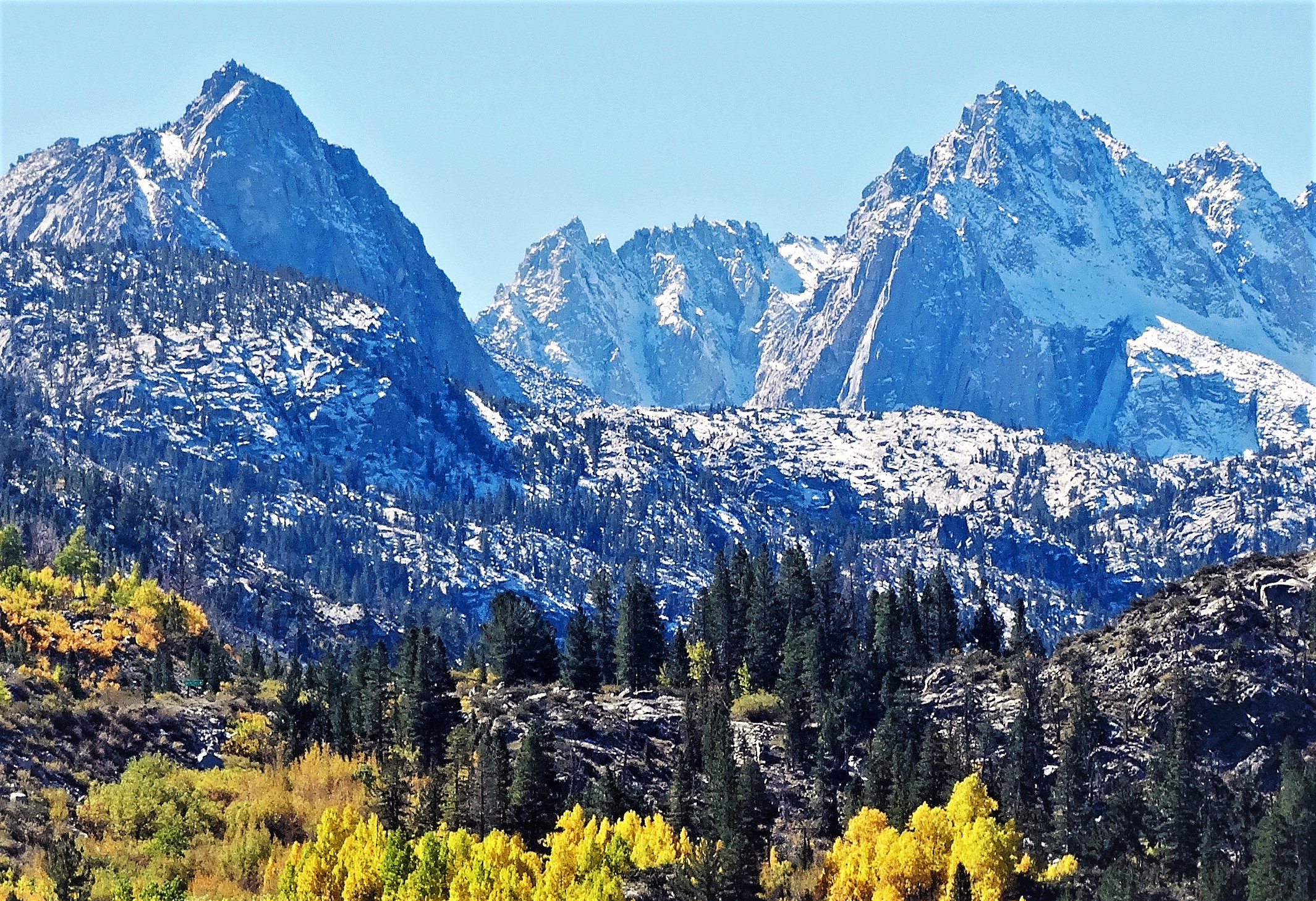
Clyde Spires centered. Picture Peak to right. "Donkey Peak" to left.

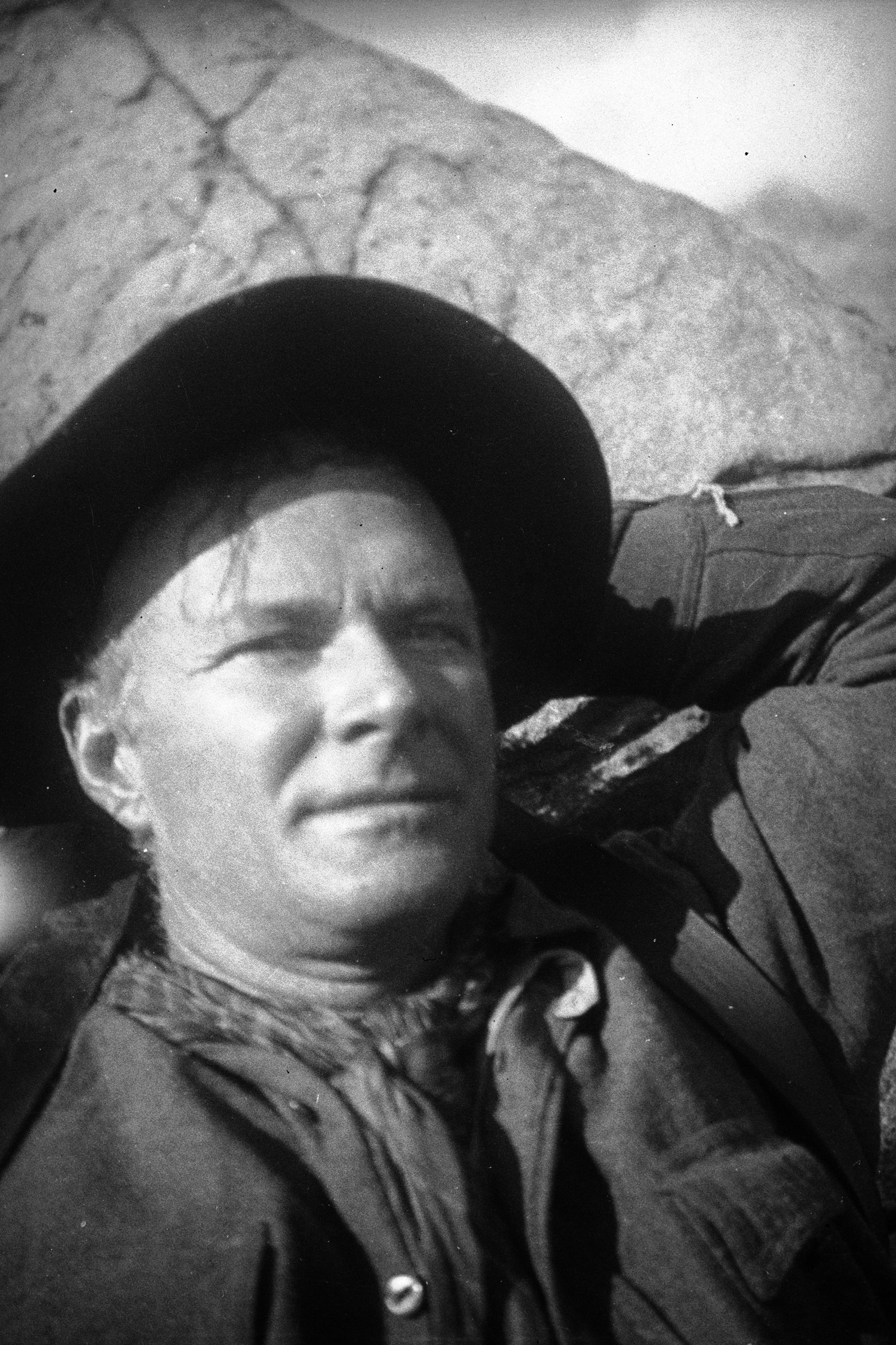
Norman Clyde

== See also ==
- List of the major 4000-meter summits of California
