= Picture Peak =

Mountain in the state of California

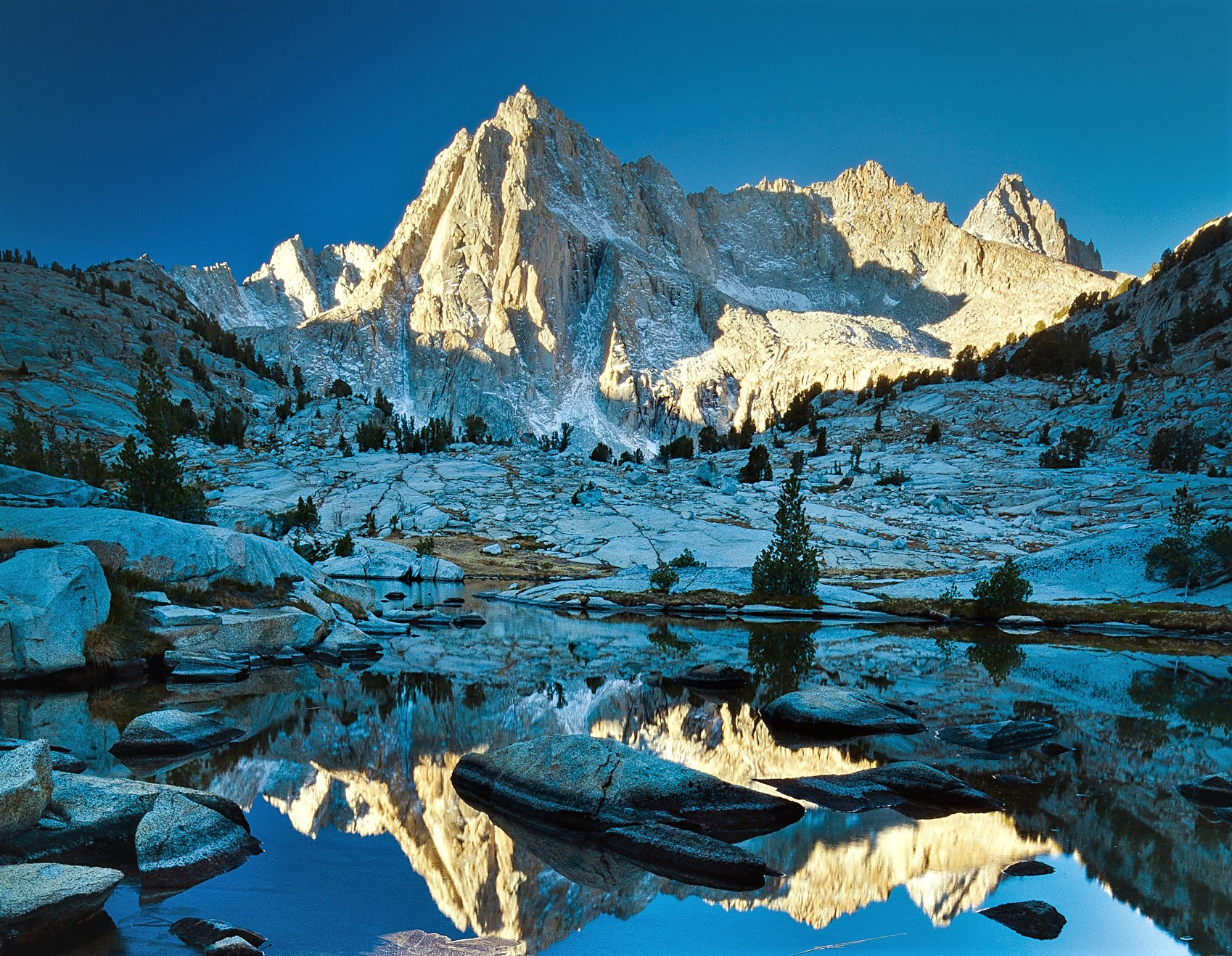
- North aspect

Highest point
- Elevation: 13,140+ ft (4,001+ m)
- Prominence: 240 ft (73 m)
- Parent peak: Mount Haeckel
- Isolation: 0.51 mi (0.82 km)
- Coordinates: 37°09′03″N 118°38′57″W

Geography
- Location within California Location within the United States
- Country: United States
- State: California
- County: Inyo
- Protected area: John Muir Wilderness
- Parent range: Sierra Nevada
- Topo map: USGS Mount Darwin

Geology
- Rock type: Granitic

Climbing
- First ascent: 1931 by Norman Clyde
- Easiest route: Exposed scramble, class 3

Picture Peak is a 13,140+ foot (4,001+ m) mountain summit located one mile east of the crest of the Sierra Nevada mountain range in Inyo County in northern California, United States. It is situated in the John Muir Wilderness within the Inyo National Forest. It is approximately 21 miles (34 km) west of the community of Big Pine, and 0.65 miles (1.05 km) east of parent Mount Haeckel. Topographic relief is significant as the north aspect rises over 2,000 feet (610 meters) above Hungry Packer Lake in approximately one-half mile (1 km). The first ascent of the summit was made July 1967, by Gary Colliver and Steve Thompson via the northeast face. This mountain's name has not been officially adopted by the U.S. Board on Geographic Names.

== Climate ==
According to the Köppen climate classification system, Picture Peak is located in an alpine climate zone. Most weather fronts originate in the Pacific Ocean, and travel east toward the Sierra Nevada mountains. As fronts approach, they are forced upward by the peaks, causing them to drop their moisture in the form of rain or snowfall onto the range (orographic lift). Precipitation runoff from this mountain drains into the headwaters of the Middle Fork of Bishop Creek.

== Climbing ==
Established climbing routes on Picture Peak:

- Southwest Gully – class 3
- Northeast Face – class 5.9
- Northeast Buttress – class 5.10b

== Gallery ==
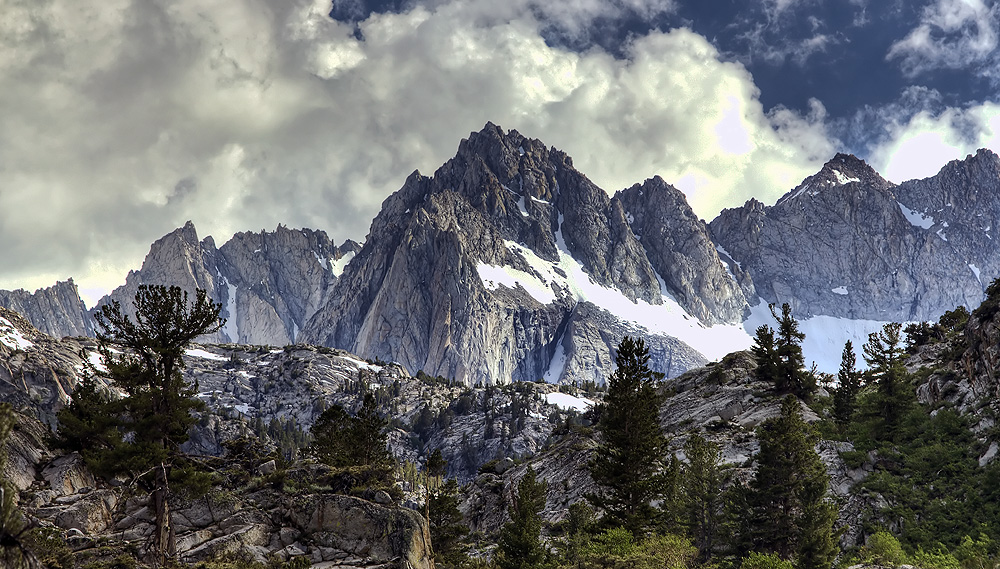
Picture Peak centered, north aspect, from Sabrina Lake area
(Clyde Spires to left, the top of Mt. Wallace visible to right)

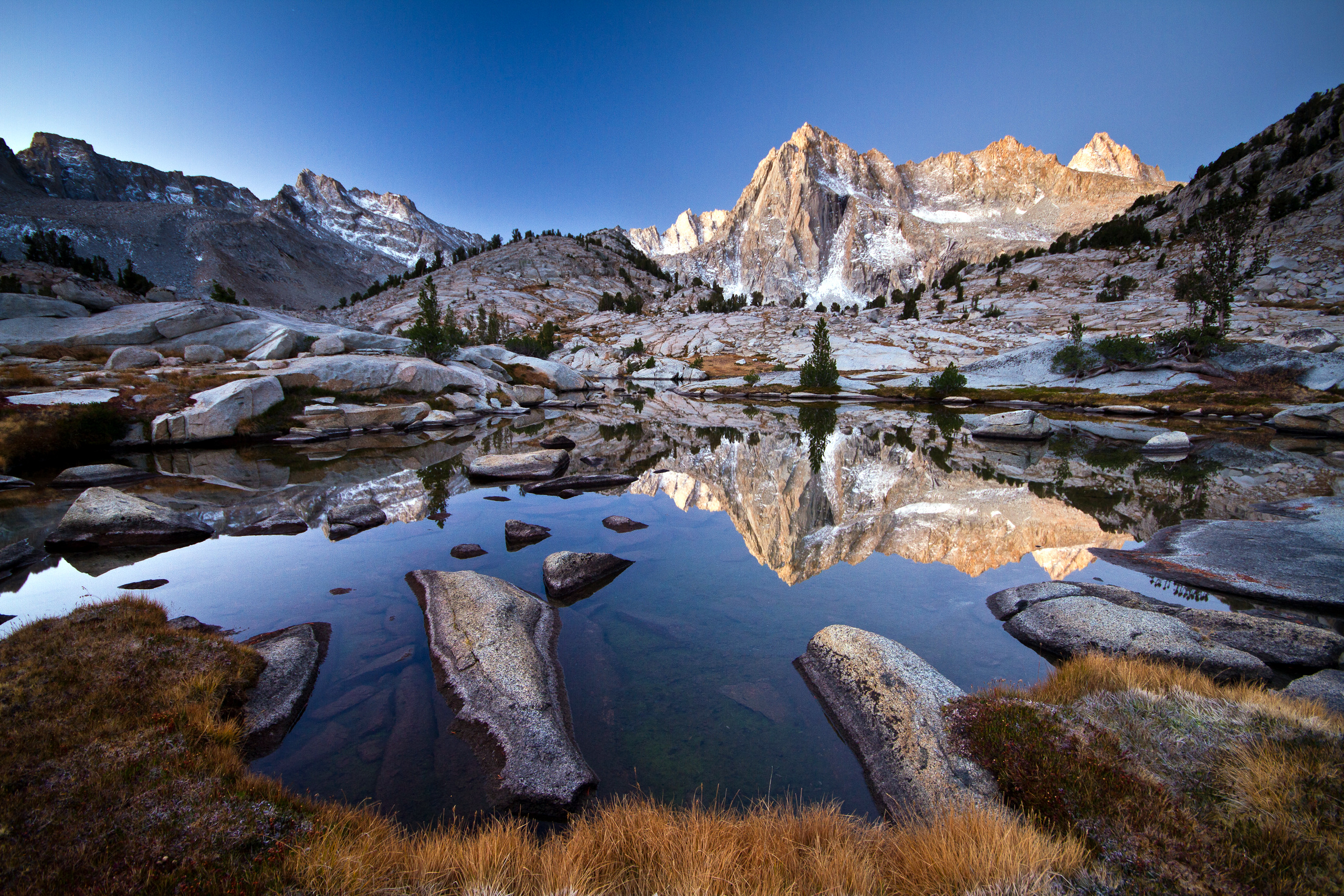
Picture Peak centered, from Sailor Lake.
Mt. Haeckel in upper right corner in back.

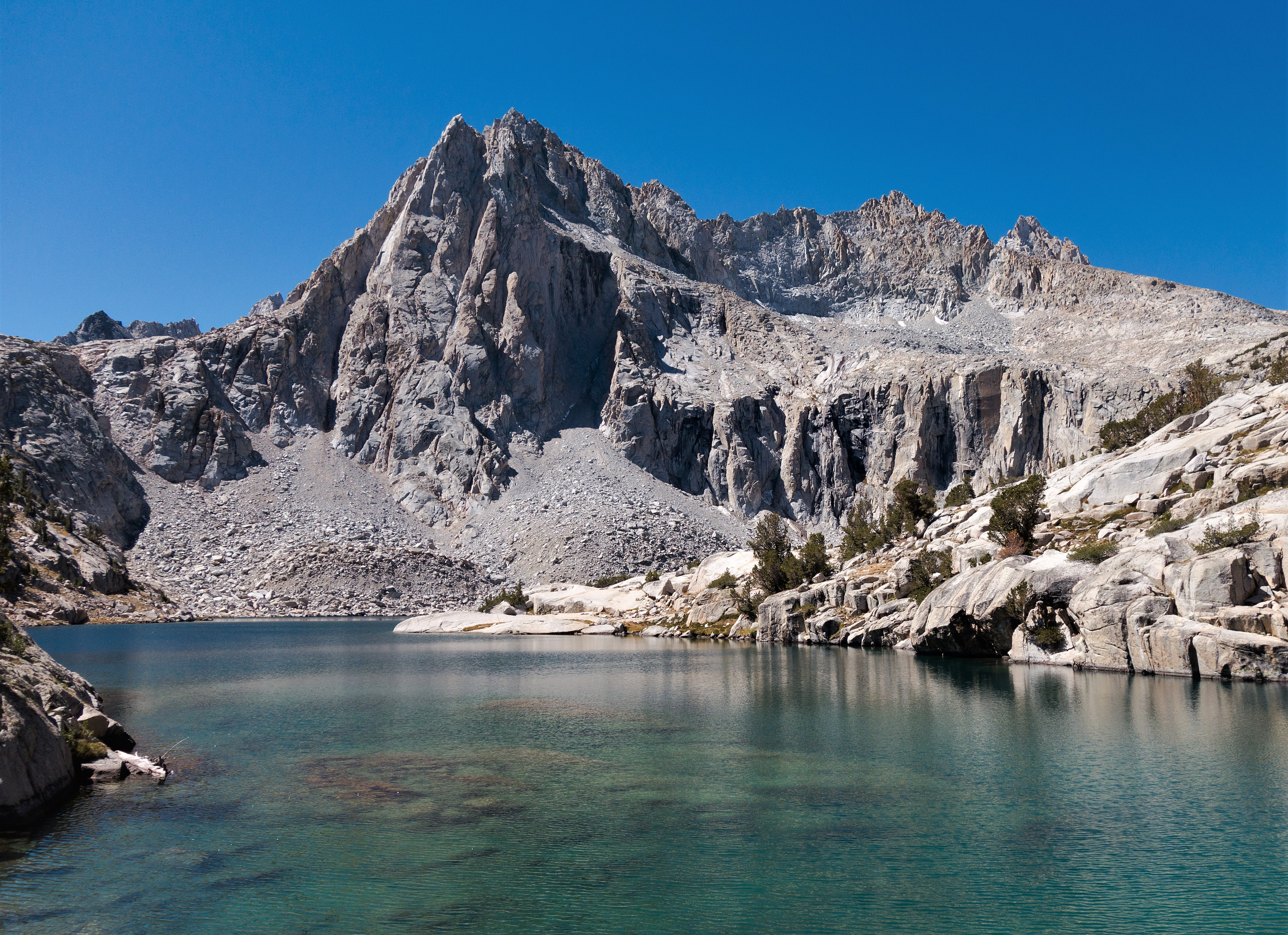
Picture Peak from Hungry Packer Lake

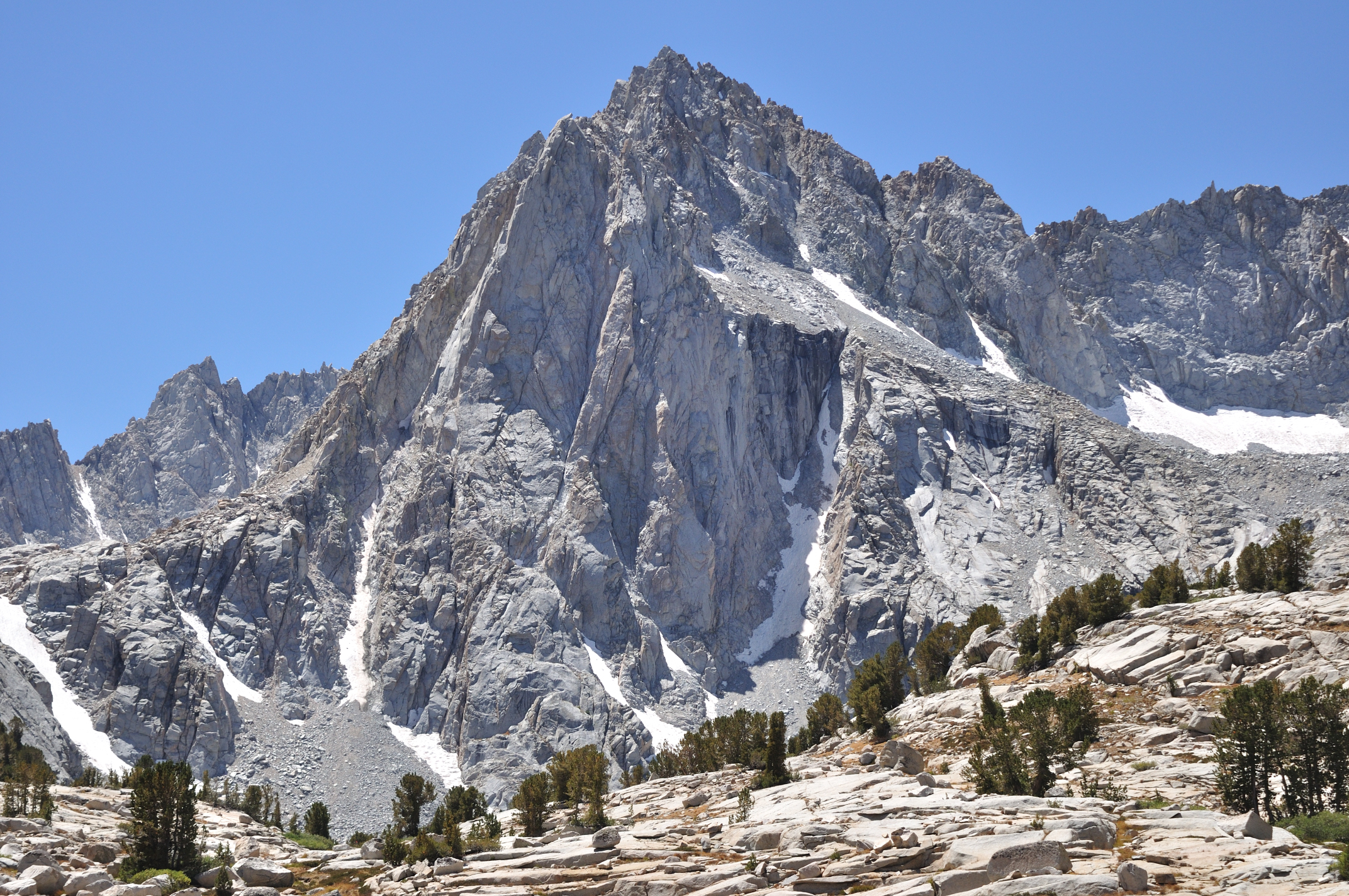

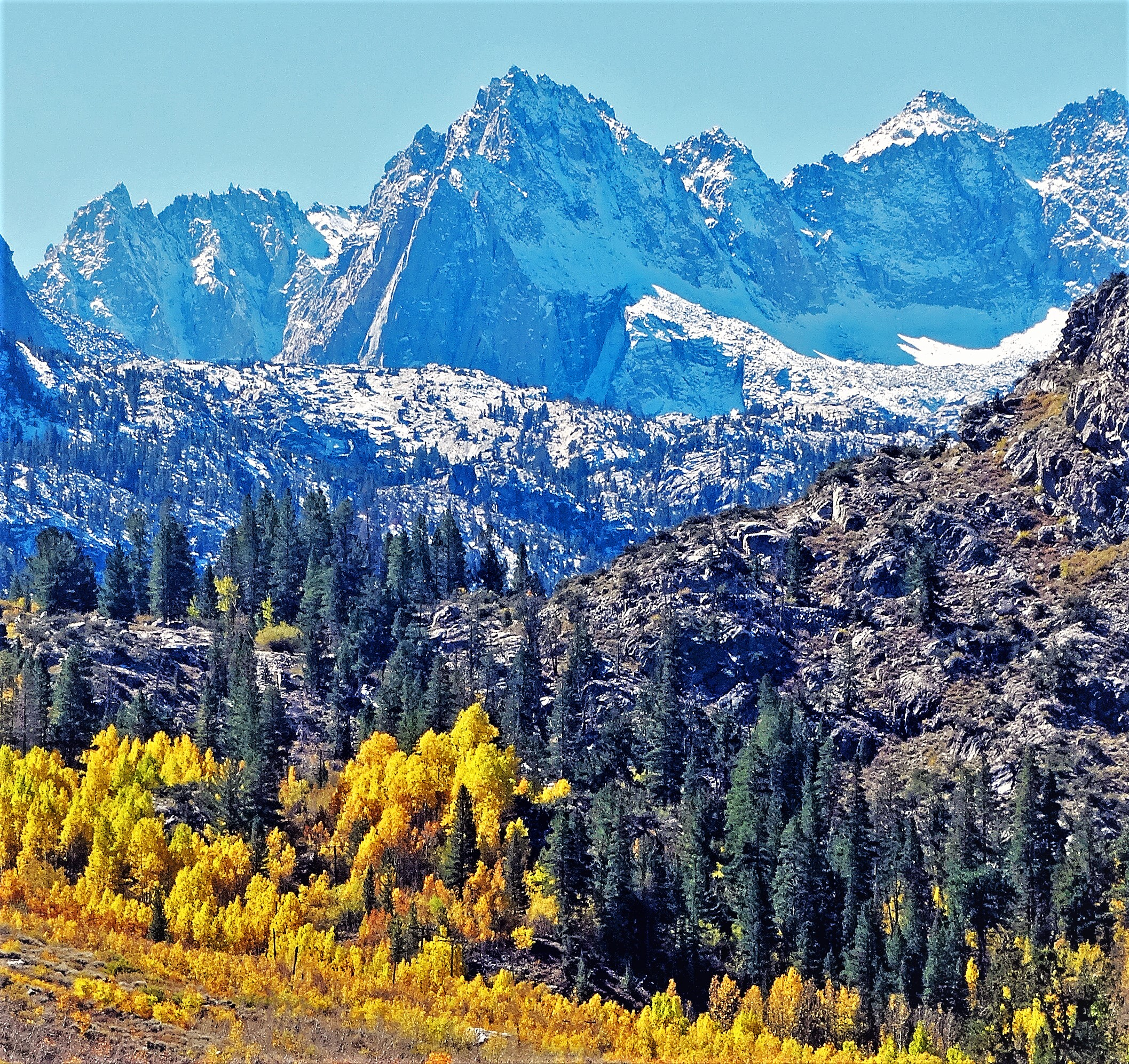
Picture Peak from Bishop Creek Valley

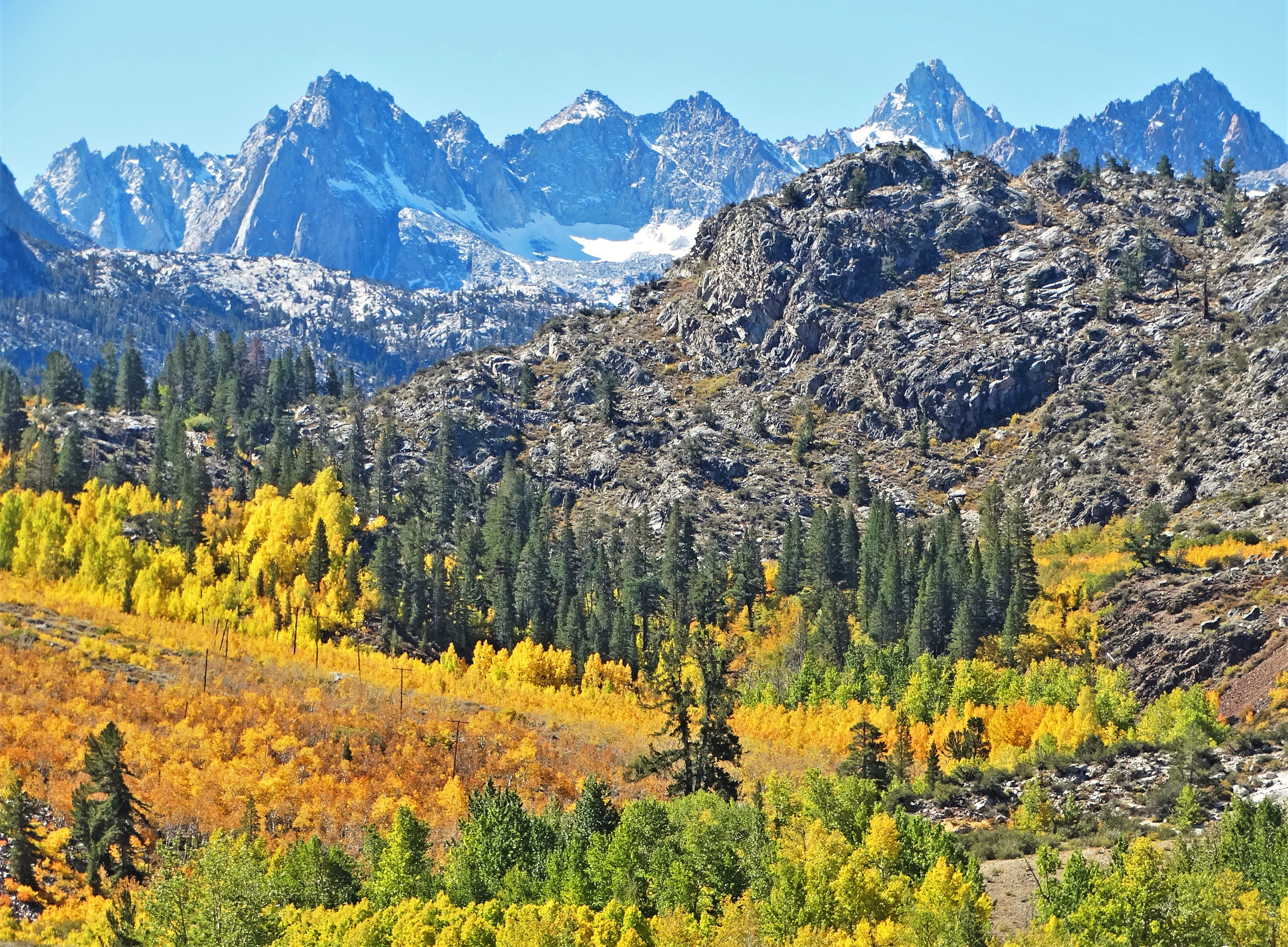
Picture Peak (left) and Mt. Haeckel (right) from Bishop Creek Valley
