= Pleasant Grove, Ohio =

- Census-designated place
- Location within Ohio Location within the United States
- Coordinates: 39°57′04″N 81°57′34″W
- Country: United States
- State: Ohio
- County: Muskingum
- Township: Washington

Area
  - Total: 3.22 sq mi (8.35 km^{2})
  - Land: 3.22 sq mi (8.33 km^{2})
  - Water: 0.0077 sq mi (0.02 km^{2})
- Elevation: 951 ft (290 m)

Population (2020)
  - Total: 1,726
  - Density: 536.9/sq mi (207.29/km^{2})
- Time zone: UTC-5 (Eastern (EST))
  - Summer (DST): UTC-4 (EDT)
- ZIP Code: 43701 (Zanesville)
- FIPS code: 39-63478
- GNIS feature ID: 2393189

Pleasant Grove is an unincorporated community and census-designated place (CDP) in Muskingum County, Ohio, United States. The population was 1,726 at the 2020 census.

== Geography ==
Pleasant Grove is close to the geographic center of Muskingum County and is at the southern end of Washington Township. It is bordered to the south by Wayne Township and to the southwest by the city of Zanesville, the county seat.

Several highways cross Pleasant Grove. Interstate 70 runs across the center of the CDP, with access from Exit 157, while U.S. Routes 40 and 22 run concurrently through the community as East Pike, south of I-70. All three highways lead west into Zanesville and east 12 miles (19 km) to New Concord. Ohio State Route 93 leads north from Routes 40 and 22 10 miles (16 km) to Adamsville and joins the other two highways leading west into Zanesville.

According to the U.S. Census Bureau, the Pleasant Grove CDP has a total area of 3.2 square miles (8.3 km^{2}), of which 0.01 square miles (0.03 km^{2}), or 0.22%, are water. The community is drained to the west by Mill Run and tributaries and to the east by a tributary of Boggs Creek; both Mill Run and Boggs Creek are tributaries of the Muskingum River.

== Demographics ==
Historical population
Census	Pop.	Note	%±
1990	2,001		—
2000	2,016		0.7%
2010	1,742		−13.6%
2020	1,726		−0.9%
U.S. Decennial Census

As of the census of 2000, there were 2,016 people, 728 households, and 516 families residing in the CDP. The population density was 631.4 inhabitants per square mile (243.8/km^{2}). There were 765 housing units at an average density of 239.6 per square mile (92.5/km^{2}). The racial makeup of the CDP was 96.18% White, 2.48% African American, 0.10% Native American, 0.25% Asian, 0.10% Pacific Islander, 0.20% from other races, and 0.69% from two or more races. Hispanic or Latino of any race were 0.35% of the population.

There were 728 households, out of which 30.8% had children under the age of 18 living with them, 54.1% were married couples living together, 11.4% had a female householder with no husband present, and 29.0% were non-families. 23.4% of all households were made up of individuals, and 7.3% had someone living alone who was 65 years of age or older. The average household size was 2.39 and the average family size was 2.81.

In the CDP, the population was spread out, with 20.0% under the age of 18, 7.7% from 18 to 24, 24.2% from 25 to 44, 23.7% from 45 to 64, and 24.4% who were 65 years of age or older. The median age was 43 years. For every 100 females, there were 87.4 males. For every 100 females age 18 and over, there were 83.2 males.

The median income for a household in the CDP was $34,728, and the median income for a family was $46,250. Males had a median income of $32,379 versus $19,034 for females. The per capita income for the CDP was $16,761. About 12.6% of families and 11.3% of the population were below the poverty line, including 13.2% of those under age 18 and 6.5% of those age 65 or over.

== Notable residents ==
- Ernest Glenn Munn, aviator
