= Leo Mustonen =

US Army Air Force cadet

Leo Arvid Mustonen (March 1, 1920 – November 18, 1942) was a Finnish-American World War II Army Air Forces aviation cadet who was reported missing after a plane crash on November 18, 1942 until his frozen remains were found in October 2005 on the surface of the Mendel Glacier in the Sierra Nevada mountain range, 63 years later. He was 22 at the time of his death.

Mustonen's aircraft, a Beech 18 AT-7 Navigator #41-21079 was based at Mather Field in Sacramento, California. It was on a navigation training mission when it disappeared, and was piloted by 2nd Lt. William Gamber.

In 1947, four UC Berkeley students found the wreck. One of the students guided an air-sea recovery team from Hamilton Field in Marin County, California, to the wreck site in late September, 1947. Engine identification tags confirmed that the plane wreckage belonged to #41-21079. No bodies were recovered. In 1948, a team of soldiers from Ft. Lewis in Washington returned to the glacier but were also unable to recover any remains.

Then, Mustonen's remains were found in 2005. In August, 2007, the body of another cadet was discovered by Peter Stekel, an author conducting research for a book about the four aviators and the disappearance of their airplane. His book, Final Flight, was published in late 2009 by Wilderness Press.

Mustonen joined the army during his senior high school year in Brainerd, Minnesota and was in training to become a navigator when he was reported missing. His family have made arrangements to bury his remains alongside those of his parents in Brainerd.

Four cadets were aboard the training flight that crashed east of Fresno, California, and until Mustonen's body was found, only some wreckage was recovered, in 1947. Pilot Lt. William Gamber and aviation cadet John Melvin Mortensen are still missing, and the National Park Service considered search for their remains in the following spring.

Mustonen's identity was revealed February 4, 2006 after forensic testing used hair and teeth as well as some of Mustonen's equipment to date the body, as his nameplate had corroded and could not be used. The autopsy on Mustonen showed that his injuries were so severe that he would have died instantly upon impact.

He was buried in his hometown on March 24, 2006.

On February 11, 2008, JPAC Joint POW-MIA Accounting Command notified the next of kin that the second airman found on Mendel Glacier was Ernest Glenn Munn.
