= Darwin Glacier (California) =

Glacier in California, United States

- Location within California Location within the United States
- Type: Mountain glacier
- Location: Kings Canyon National Park, Fresno County, California, United States
- Coordinates: 37°10′18″N 118°40′19″W
- Length: .15 mi (0.24 km)
- Terminus: Barren rock
- Status: Retreating

Darwin Glacier is a mountain glacier located on the north side of Mount Darwin in the Sierra Nevada, California. The glacier is located in Kings Canyon National Park. The glacier inherited its name from Mount Darwin, named for Charles Robert Darwin. In 2004, a study found that since 1900, Darwin Glacier had lost half its surface area.

== See also ==
- List of glaciers in the United States
