= Mount Wallace (Fresno and Inyo counties, California) =

Mountain in the state of California

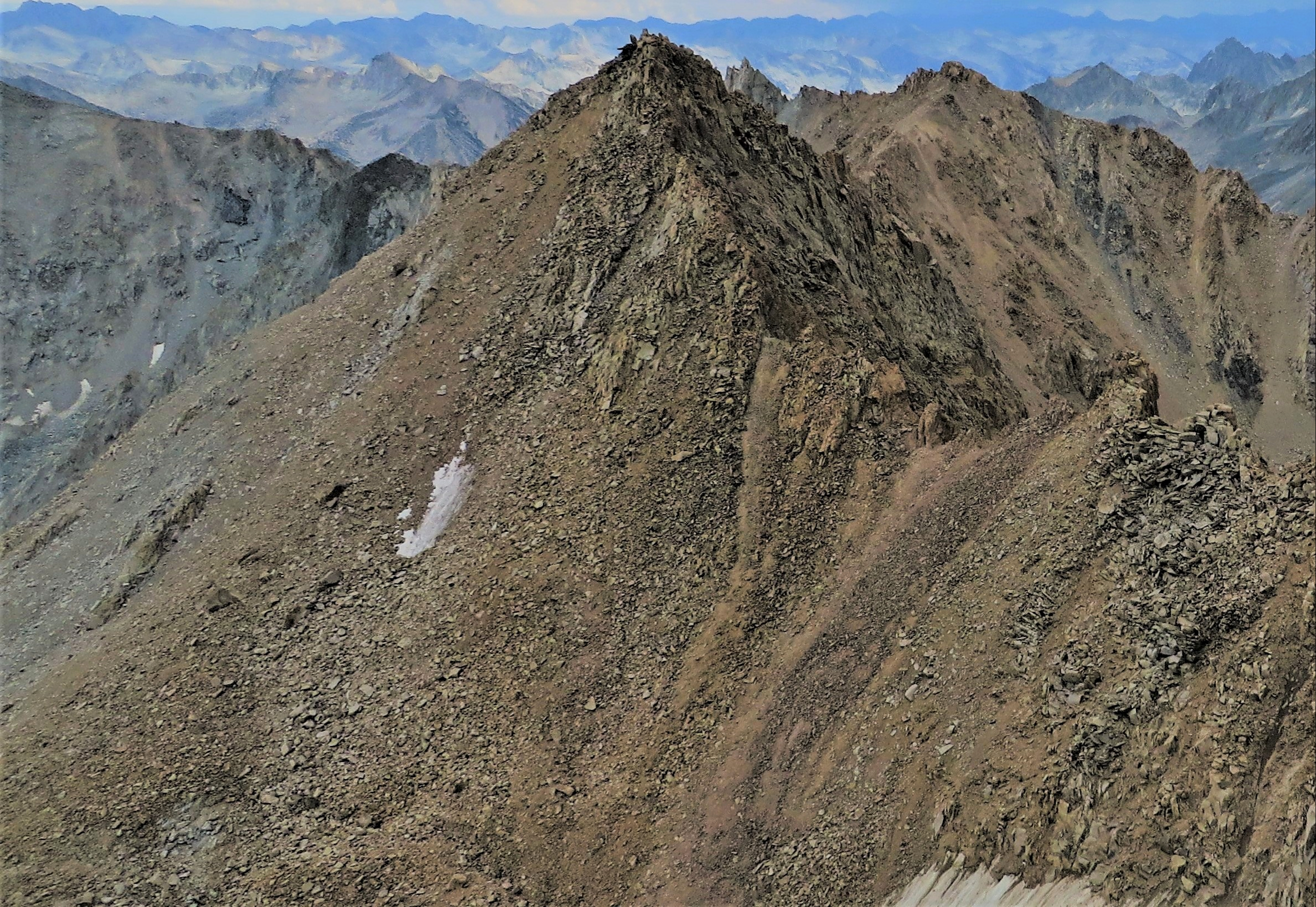
- Northwest aspect

Highest point
- Elevation: 13,377 ft (4,077 m)
- Prominence: 337 ft (103 m)
- Parent peak: Mount Haeckel (13,418 ft)
- Isolation: 0.39 mi (0.63 km)
- Listing: Sierra Peaks Section
- Coordinates: 37°08′49″N 118°39′24″W

Naming
- Etymology: Alfred Russel Wallace

Geography
- Location within California Location within the United States
- Location: Kings Canyon National Park; Fresno County / Inyo County; California, U.S.
- Parent range: Sierra Nevada
- Topo map: USGS Mount Darwin

Geology
- Rock age: Cretaceous
- Mountain type: Fault block
- Rock type: granitic

Climbing
- First ascent: July 16, 1895
- Easiest route: class 3

Mount Wallace is a 13,377-foot-elevation (4,077-meter) mountain summit located on the crest of the Sierra Nevada mountain range in northern California, United States. It is situated on the shared boundary of Kings Canyon National Park with John Muir Wilderness, and along the common border of Fresno County with Inyo County. It is 21 miles (34 km) west of the community of Big Pine, 1.38 miles (2.22 km) northwest of Mount Powell, 0.5 miles (0.80 km) southwest of Picture Peak, and 0.37 miles (0.60 km) southeast of Mount Haeckel, which is the nearest higher neighbor. Mount Wallace ranks as the 79th-highest summit in California, and the ninth-highest in the Evolution Region.

== History ==
In 1895, Sierra Club explorer Theodore S. Solomons named a group of mountains in the Sierra Nevada after exponents of Darwin's theory of evolution. These six peaks are now known collectively as the Evolution Group. Solomons wrote: "At a distance of two miles it [the wall of Mount Darwin] rises perpendicularly five or six hundred feet, forming Mt. Haeckel, and a mile beyond again rises several hundred feet higher, though not quite so sharply, forming the peak called Mt. Wallace... Next morning [July 16, 1895] we climbed Mt. Wallace." This mountain is named for Alfred Russel Wallace (1823–1913), a British naturalist, explorer, geographer, anthropologist, and biologist who is best known for developing the theory of evolution contemporaneously with Darwin. The other five peaks were named after Charles Darwin, John Fiske, Ernst Haeckel, Herbert Spencer, and Thomas Henry Huxley.

The 1895 climb by Theodore Solomons and party was the first ascent of the summit.

== Climate ==
Mount Wallace is located in an alpine climate zone. Most weather fronts originate in the Pacific Ocean, and travel east toward the Sierra Nevada mountains. As fronts approach, they are forced upward by the peaks, causing them to drop their moisture in the form of rain or snowfall onto the range (orographic lift). Precipitation runoff from this mountain drains northeast into Bishop Creek, and west into Evolution Creek, which is a San Joaquin River tributary.

== Gallery ==
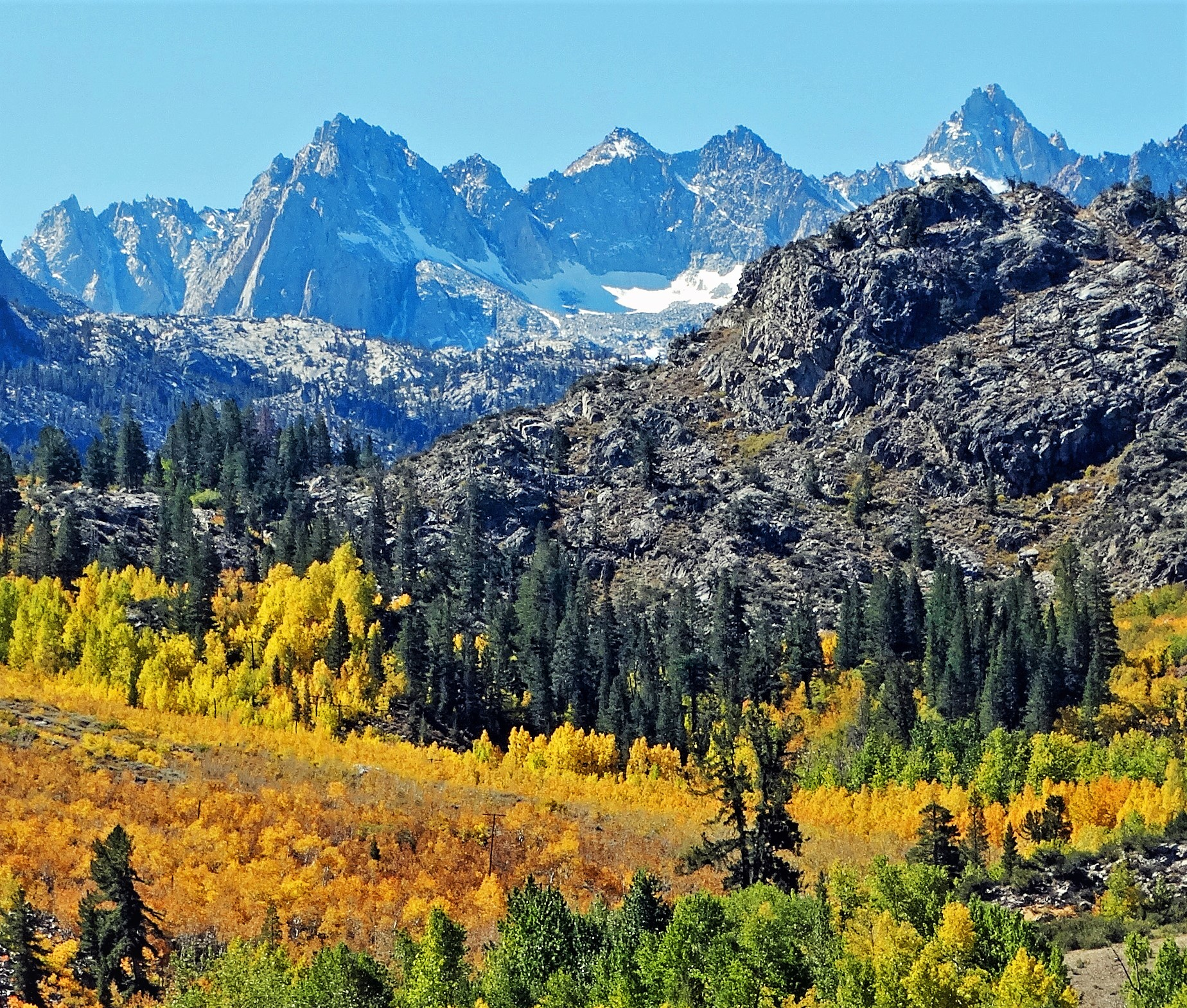
Mt. Wallace's summit centered (behind ridge)
Picture Peak (left), Mt. Haeckel in upper right. Clyde Spires far left.

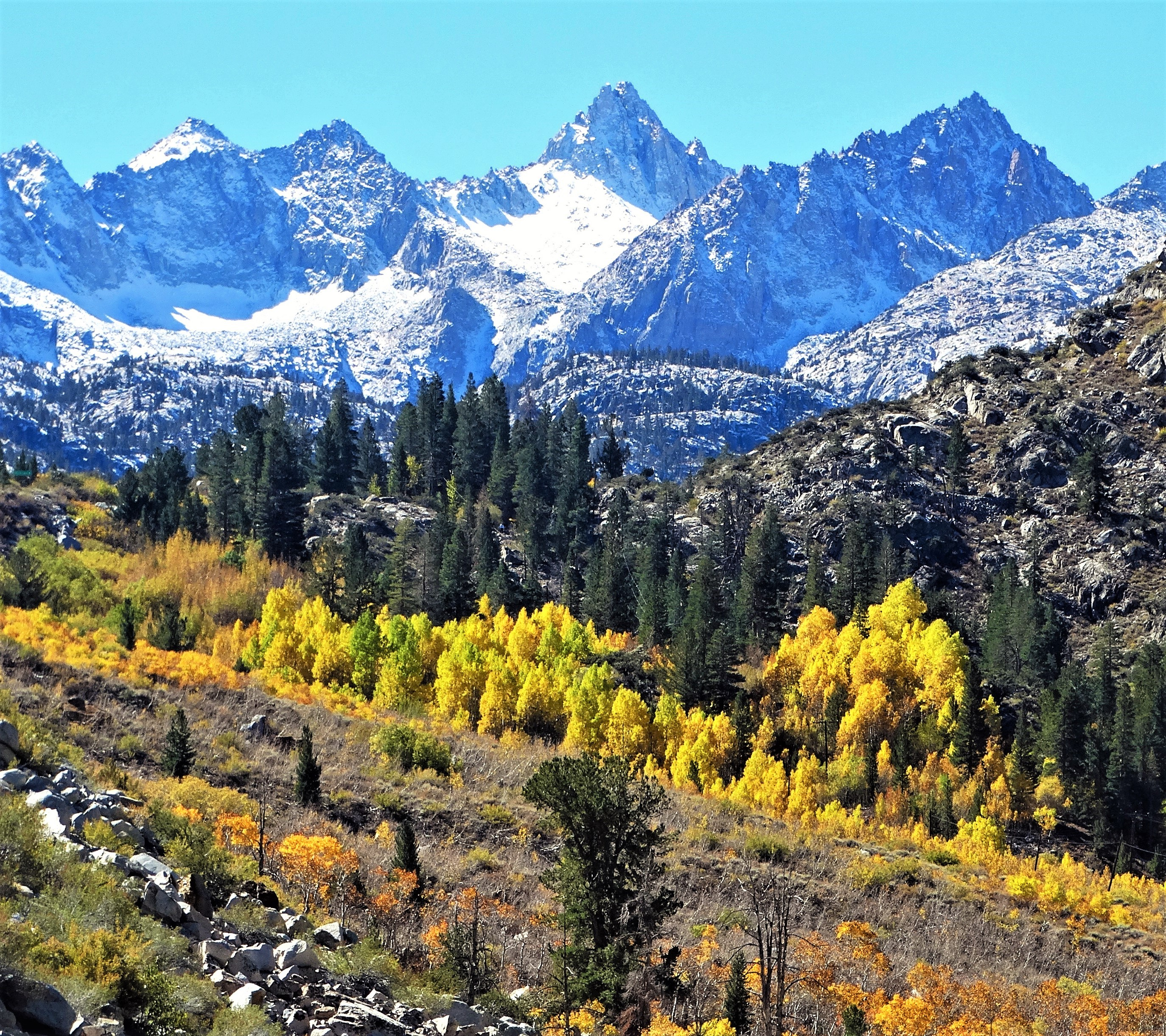
Mt. Haeckel centered, top of Wallace behind ridge to left

== See also ==
- List of the major 4000-meter summits of California
