= Mount Haeckel =

Mountain in the state of California

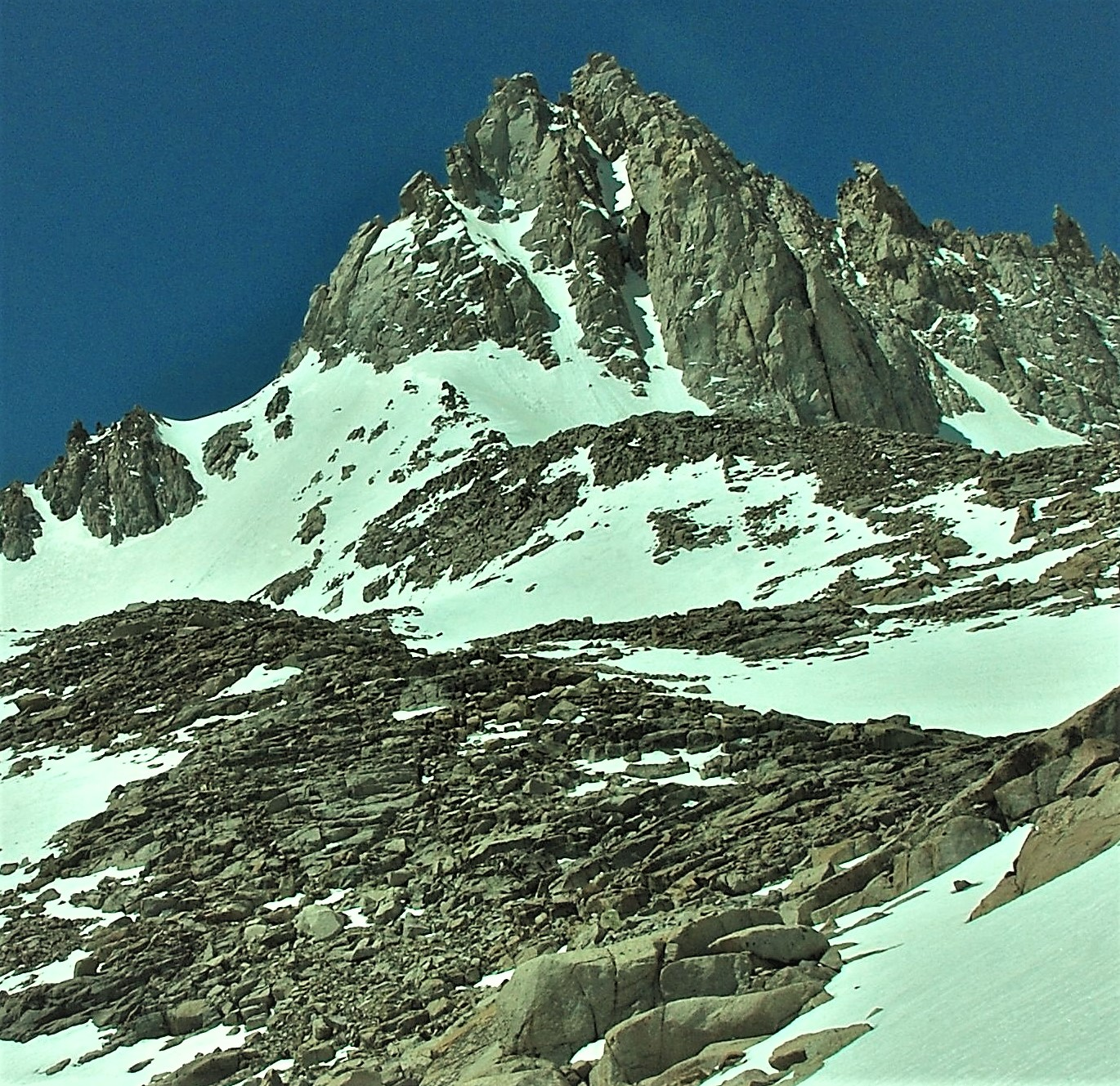
- North face

Highest point
- Elevation: 13,424 ft (4,092 m)
- Prominence: 498 ft (152 m)
- Parent peak: Mount Fiske
- Isolation: 1.07 mi (1.72 km)
- Listing: Sierra Peaks Section; Western States Climbers Star Peak; Vagmarken Sierra Crest List
- Coordinates: 37°09′04″N 118°39′40″W

Naming
- Etymology: Ernst Haeckel

Geography
- Location within California Location within the United States
- Location: Kings Canyon National Park; Fresno / Inyo counties, California, U.S.
- Parent range: Sierra Nevada
- Topo map: USGS Mount Darwin

Geology
- Rock type: granite

Climbing
- First ascent: July 14, 1920
- Easiest route: class 3

Mount Haeckel is a 13,424-foot (4,092 m) mountain summit located on the crest of the Sierra Nevada mountain range in northern California, United States. It is situated on the shared boundary of Kings Canyon National Park with John Muir Wilderness, and along the common border of Fresno County with Inyo County. It is 21.5 miles (34.6 km) west of the community of Big Pine, 1.27 miles (2.04 km) south-southeast of Mount Darwin, and one mile north-northeast of Mount Fiske, which is the nearest higher neighbor. Mount Haeckel ranks as the 71st highest summit in California.

== History ==
In 1895, Sierra Club explorer Theodore S. Solomons named a group of mountains in the Sierra Nevada after exponents of Darwin's theory of evolution. These six peaks are now known collectively as the Evolution Group. This mountain is named for Ernst Haeckel (1834–1919), a German zoologist. The other five peaks were named after Charles Darwin, John Fiske, Alfred Russel Wallace, Herbert Spencer, and Thomas Henry Huxley.

On July 14, 1920, Walter L. Huber led a Sierra Club party of nine climbers to the first ascent of the summit via the West Shoulder. A few minutes later, Edward O. Allen, Francis E. Crofts, and Olcott Haskell arrived via the South Ridge. This second Sierra Club party was surprised that they were not on Mount Darwin, their intended destination.

== Climbing ==
Established climbing routes on Mount Haeckel:

- West Shoulder – class 3 – First Ascent 1920
- South Ridge – class 3 – FA 1920
- North Face – class 3 – FA 1933 by Jack Riegelhuth
- Northeast Ridge – class 4 – FA 1935

The Northwest Arête is considered one of the classic climbing routes in the Sierra Nevada.

== Climate ==
According to the Köppen climate classification system, Mount Haeckel is located in an alpine climate zone. Most weather fronts originate in the Pacific Ocean, and travel east toward the Sierra Nevada mountains. As fronts approach, they are forced upward by the peaks, causing them to drop their moisture in the form of rain or snowfall onto the range (orographic lift). Precipitation runoff from this mountain drains northeast into Bishop Creek, and west into Evolution Creek, which is a San Joaquin River tributary.

== Gallery ==
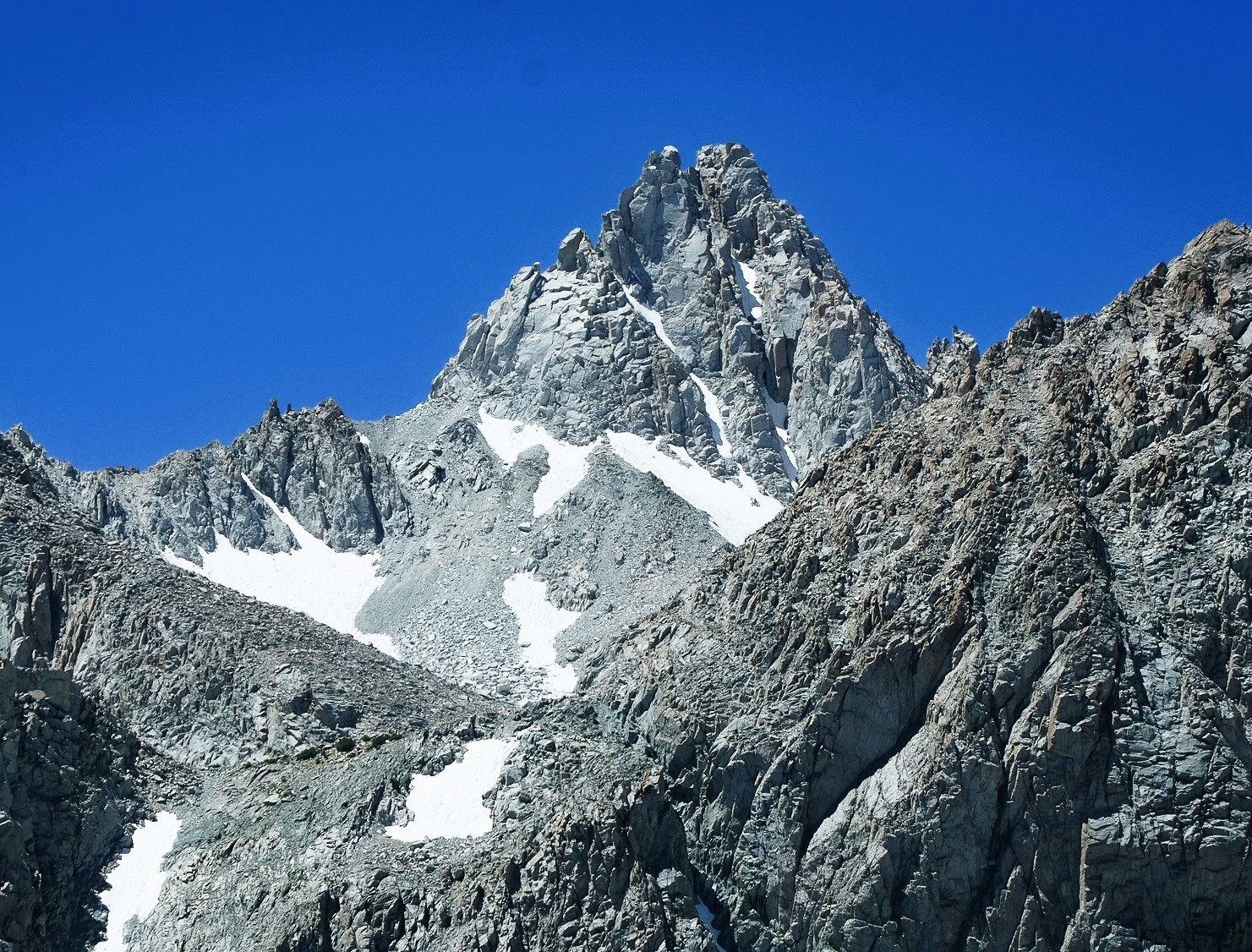
North aspect

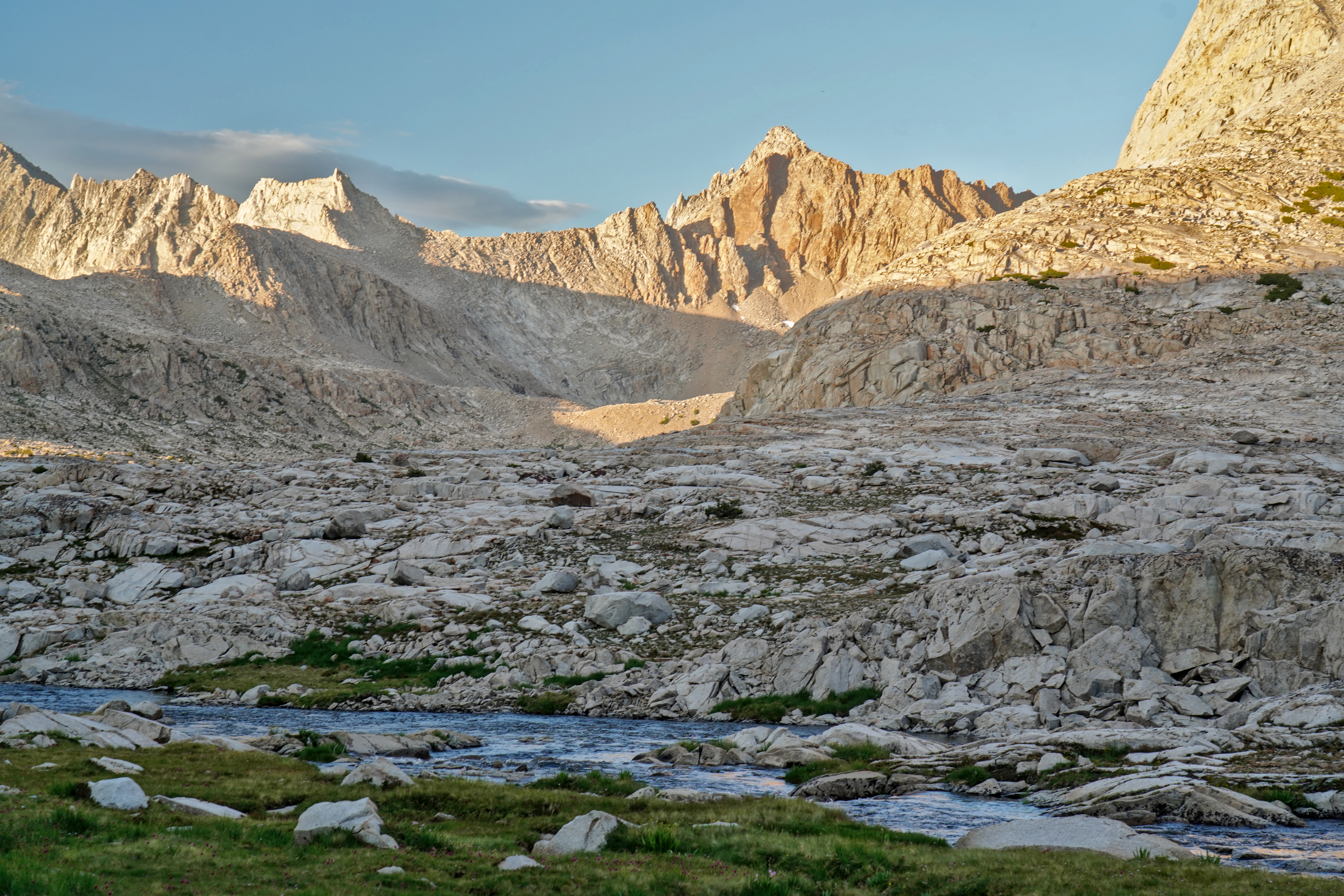
West aspect

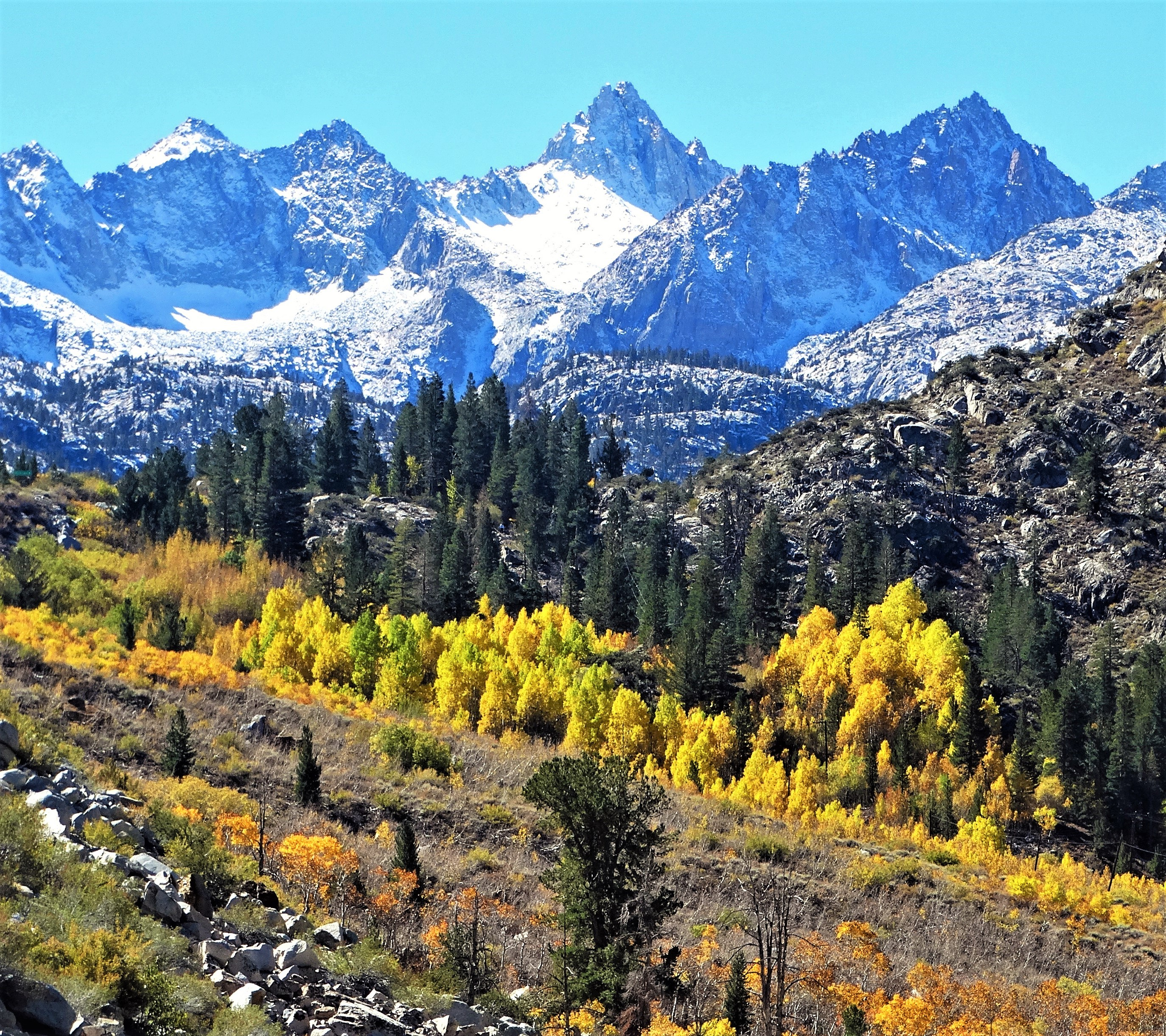
Mt. Haeckel centered

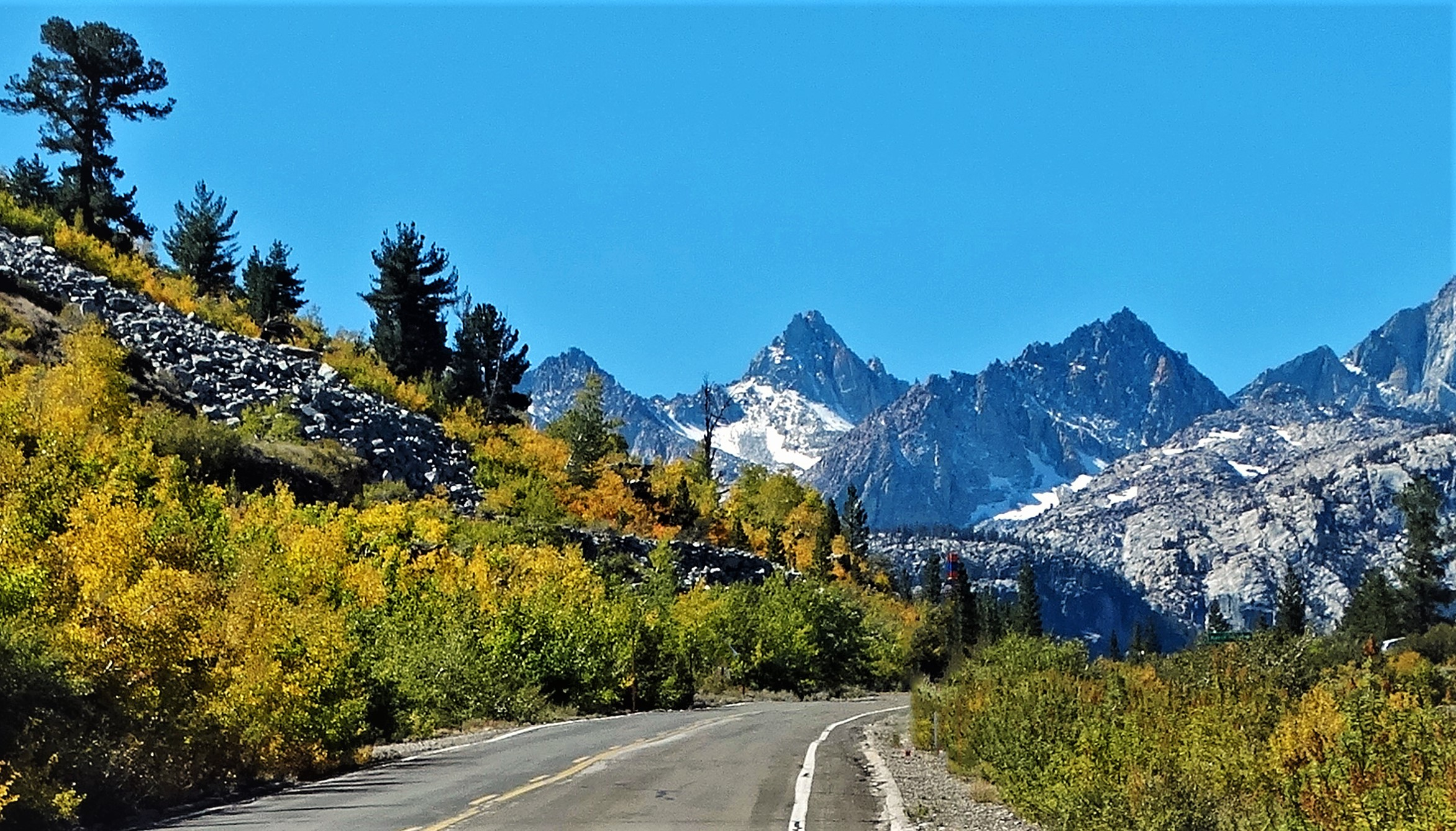
Heackel centered, from Highway 168, (the road to Lake Sabrina)

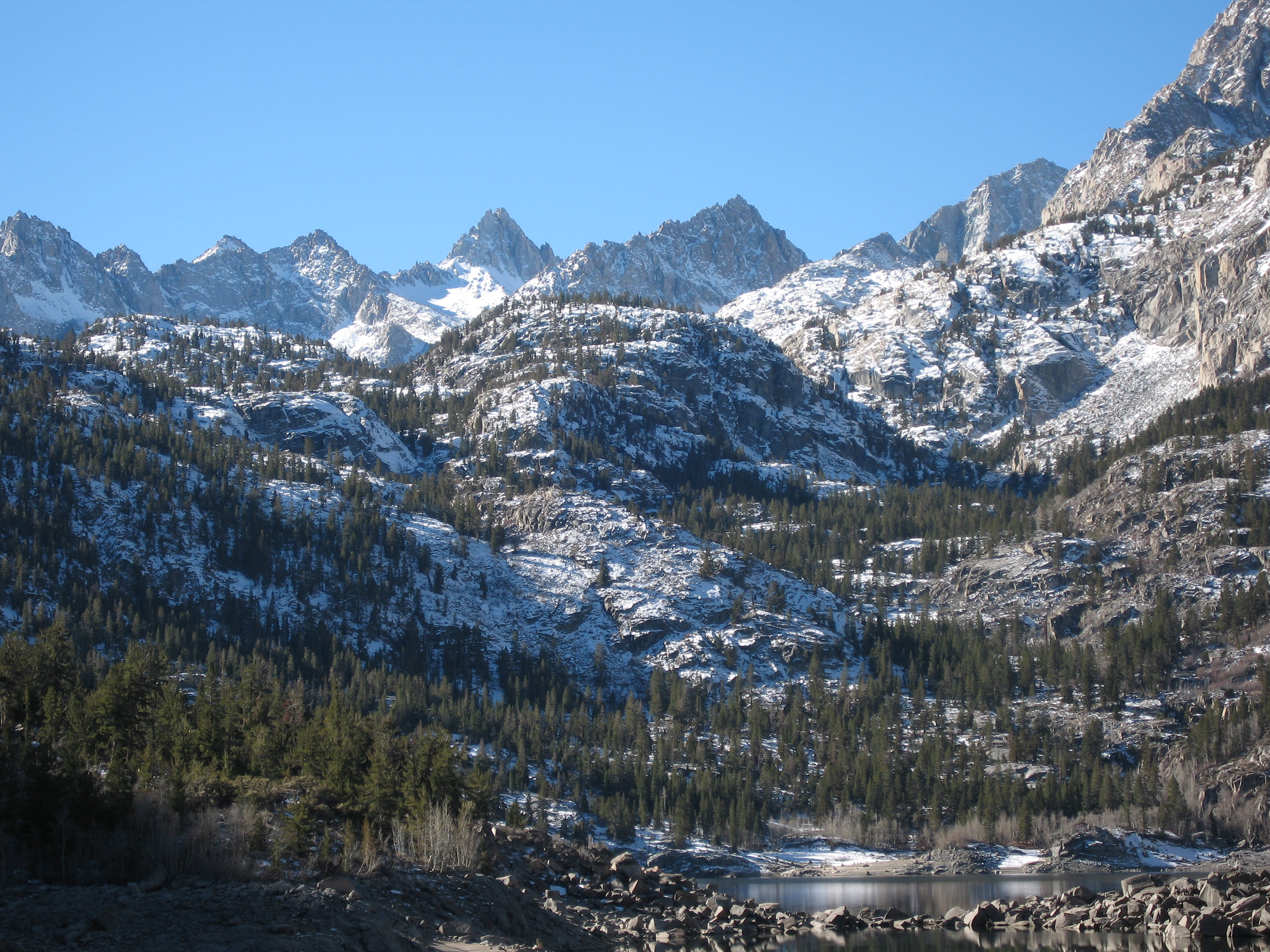
Haeckel left of center, from Lake Sabrina

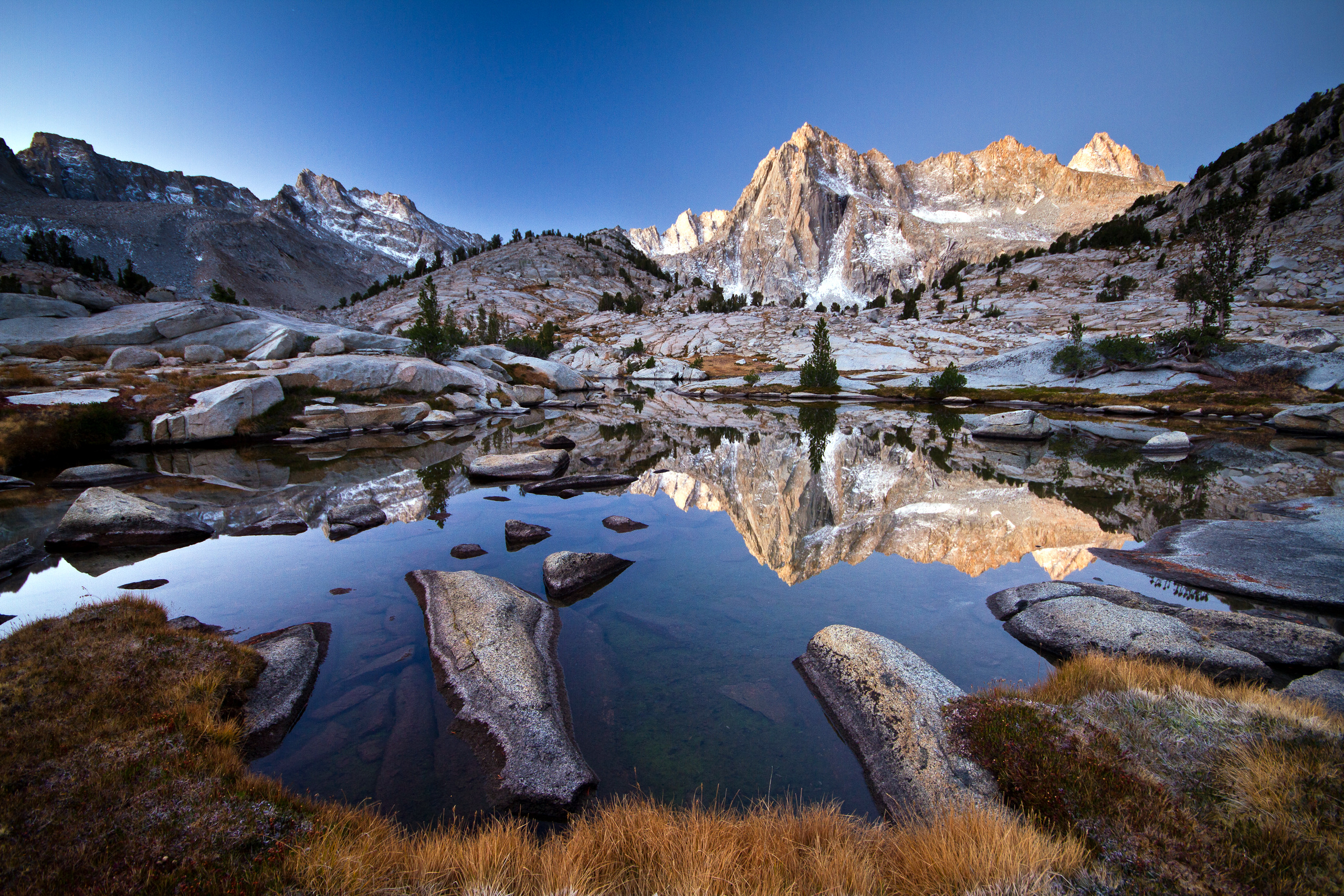
Haeckel in upper right corner in back.
Picture Peak centered, from Sailor Lake

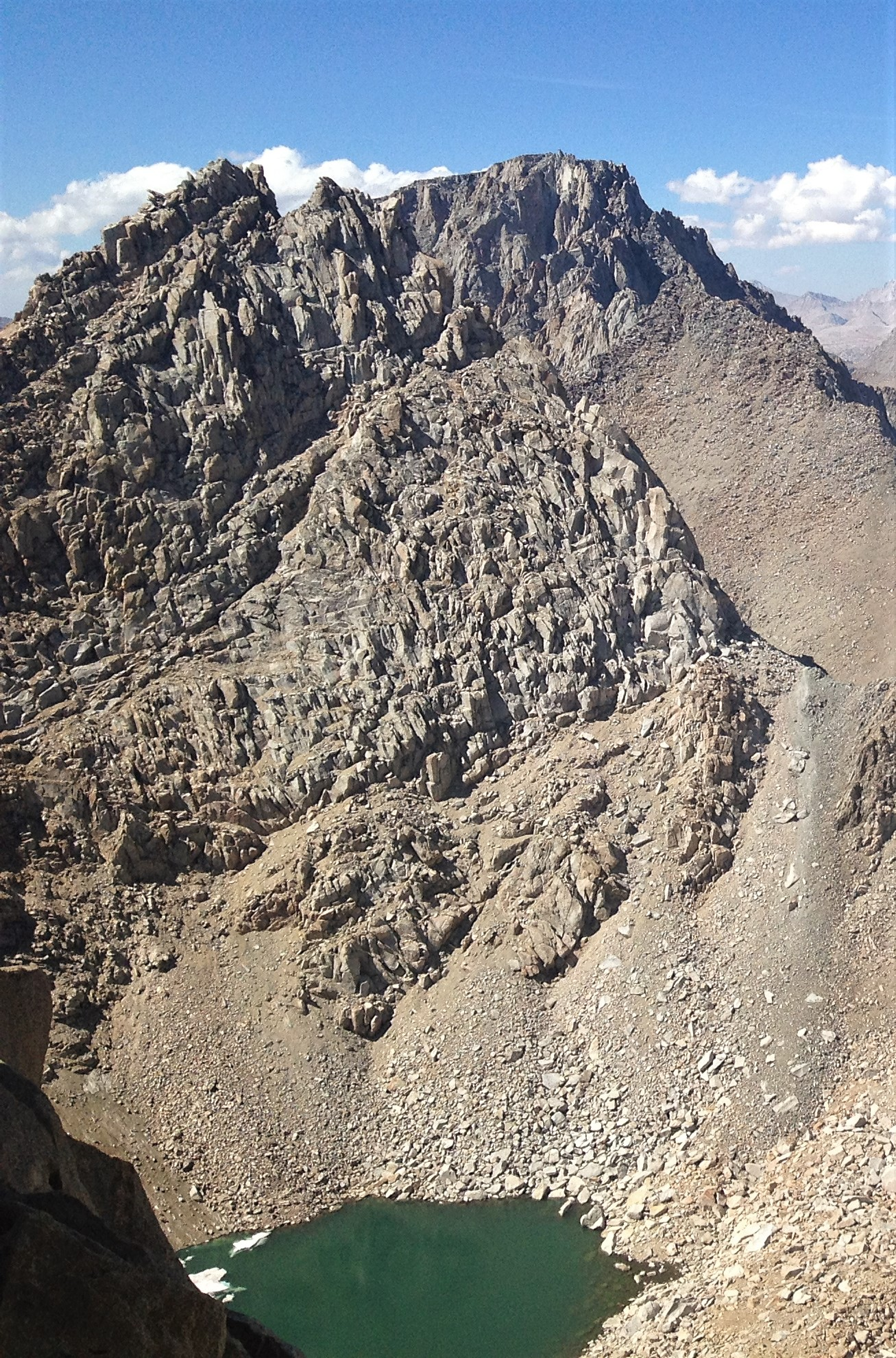
Southeast aspect of Haeckel from Mt. Wallace. Mt. Darwin behind, right

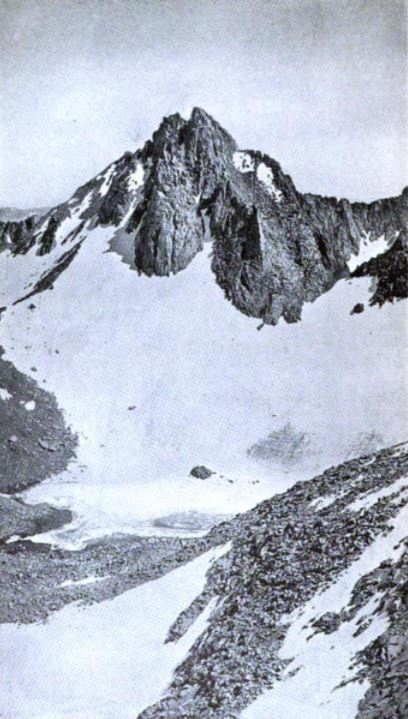
circa early 1920s

== See also ==
- List of the major 4000-meter summits of California
- Mount Wallace
