= Mount Lamarck =

Mountain in the state of California

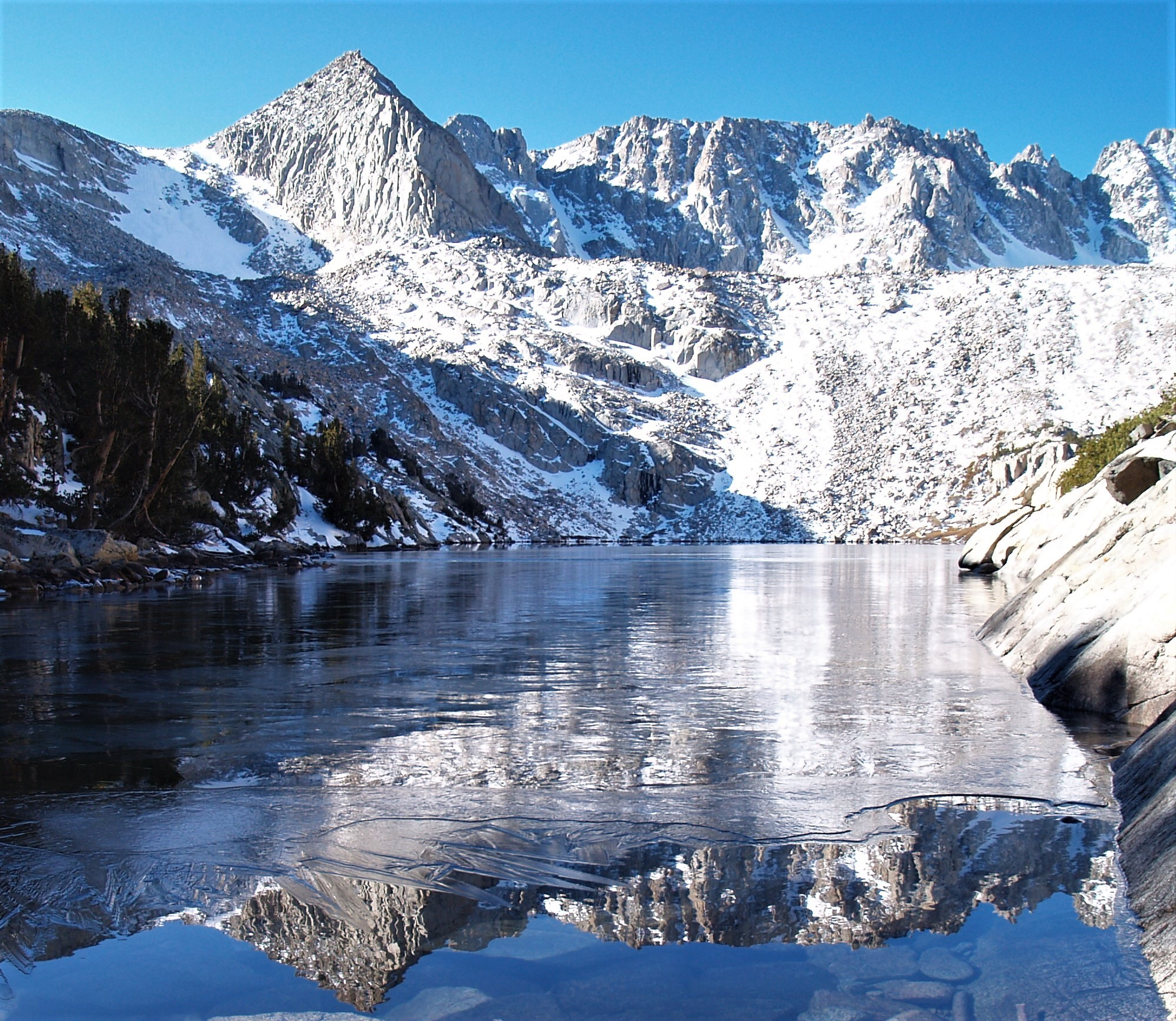
- Northwest aspect from Upper Lamarck Lake. (Peak 12,373, Mt. Lamarck, North Lamarck)

Highest point
- Elevation: 13,417 ft (4,090 m)
- Prominence: 97 ft (30 m)
- Parent peak: Peak 13464 (Mt. Lamarck North)
- Isolation: 0.21 mi (0.34 km)
- Listing: Sierra Peaks Section
- Coordinates: 37°11′42″N 118°40′14″W

Naming
- Etymology: Jean-Baptiste Lamarck

Geography
- Location within California Location within the United States
- Location: Kings Canyon National Park; Fresno County / Inyo County; California, U.S.
- Parent range: Sierra Nevada; Evolution Crest
- Topo map: USGS Mount Darwin

Geology
- Rock age: Cretaceous
- Mountain type: Fault block
- Rock type: granitic

Climbing
- First ascent: 1925
- Easiest route: class 2 Southeast slope

Mount Lamarck is a 13,417-foot-elevation (4,090-meter) mountain summit located on the crest of the Sierra Nevada mountain range in northern California, United States. It is situated on the shared boundary of Kings Canyon National Park with John Muir Wilderness, and along the common border of Fresno County with Inyo County. It is 20 miles (32 km) southwest of the community of Bishop, and 1.9 miles (3.1 km) north of Mount Darwin. Subsidiary peak Mount Lamarck North (13,464 feet (4,104 meters) ranks as the 67th highest summit in California, and the sixth highest in the Evolution Region. Topographic relief is significant as the east aspect rises 4,290 feet (1,310 meters) above Lake Sabrina in three miles, and the west aspect rises 3,600 feet (1,100 meters) above Evolution Valley in three miles.

== History ==
In 1895, Sierra Club explorer Theodore S. Solomons named a group of mountains in the Sierra Nevada after exponents of Darwin's theory of evolution. These six peaks are now known collectively as the Evolution Group. The peaks were named after Charles Darwin, John Fiske, Alfred Russel Wallace, Herbert Spencer, Ernst Haeckel and Thomas Henry Huxley.

This mountain's name was officially adopted in 1911 by the United States Board on Geographic Names, based on a suggestion by Grove Karl Gilbert, to honor French naturalist Jean-Baptiste Lamarck (1744–1829), an early proponent of the idea that biological evolution occurred in accordance with natural laws.

The first ascent of the summit was made via the south slope on August 15, 1925, by Norman Clyde, who is credited with 130 first ascents, most of which were in the Sierra Nevada.

== Climate ==
According to the Köppen climate classification system, Mount Lamarck is located in an alpine climate zone. Most weather fronts originate in the Pacific Ocean, and travel east toward the Sierra Nevada mountains. As fronts approach, they are forced upward by the peaks, causing them to drop their moisture in the form of rain or snowfall onto the range (orographic lift). The climate supports a small glacier in the cirque below Lamarck's steep northern cliffs. Precipitation runoff from this mountain drains northeast into Lamarck Creek which is a tributary to Bishop Creek, and west into Evolution Creek, which is a San Joaquin River tributary.

== Gallery ==
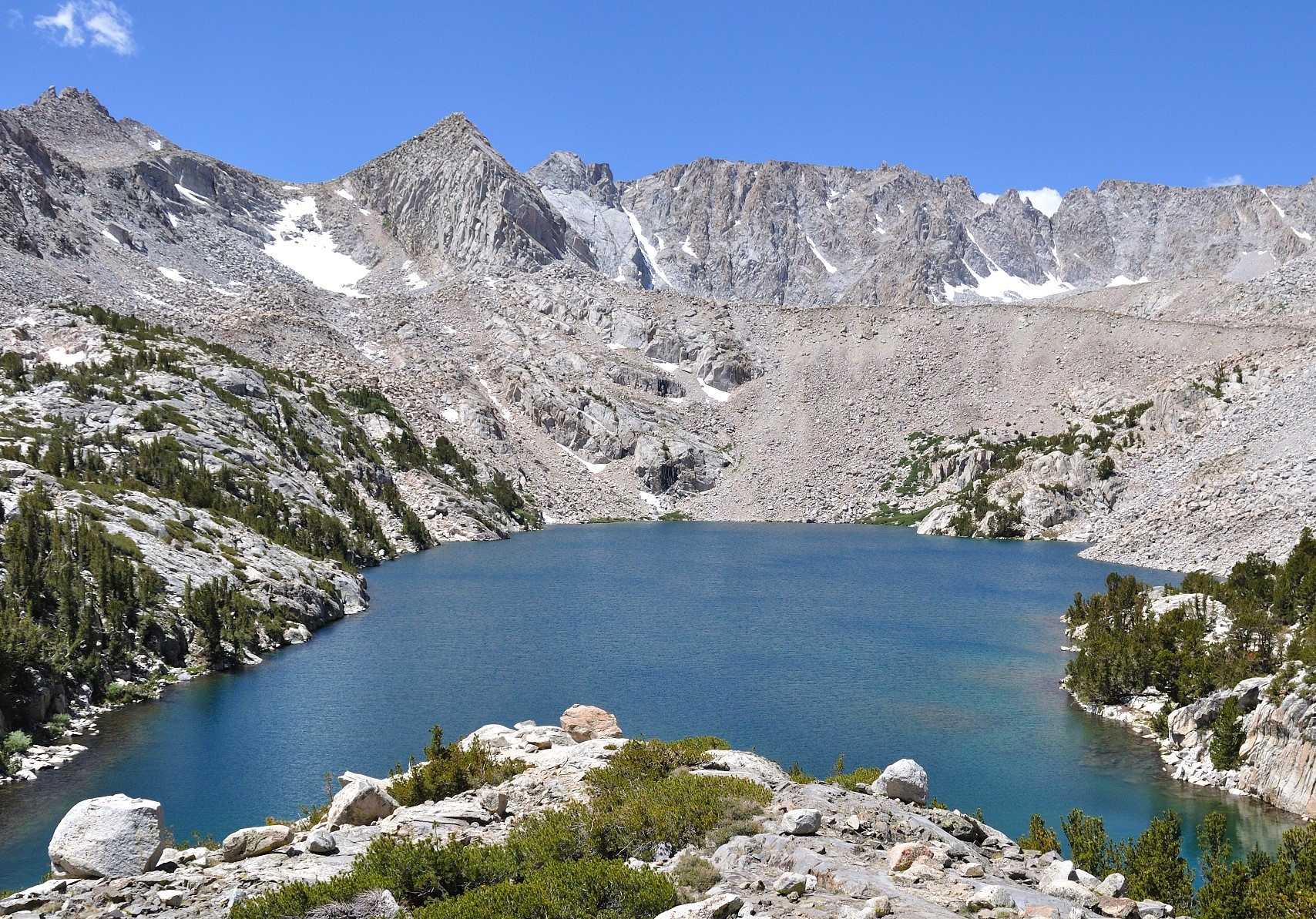
Upper Lamarck Lake with Peak 12373, Mount Lamarck, North Lamarck

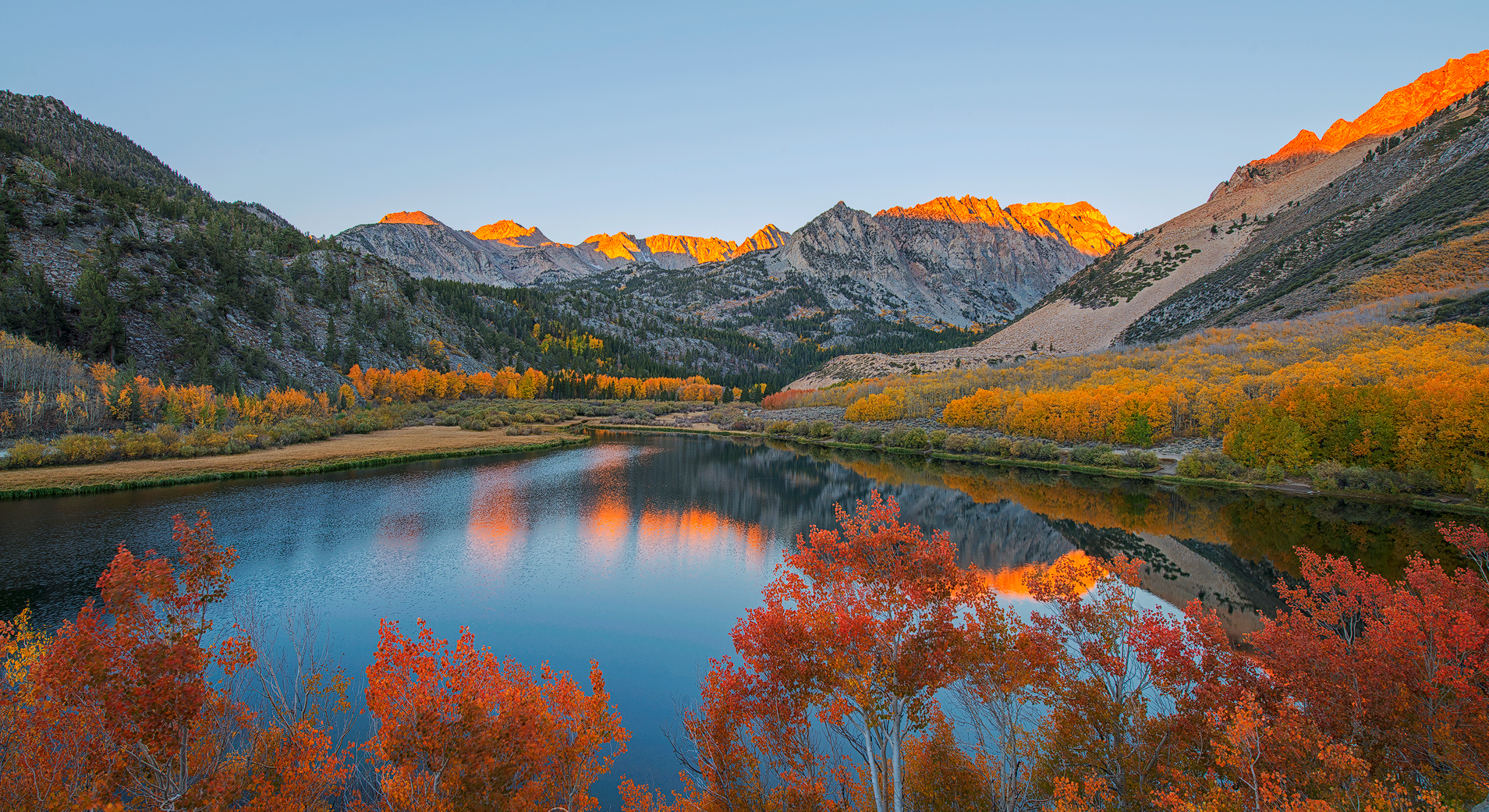
Sunrise at North Lake, with Lamarck slightly left of center in back

== See also ==
- List of the major 4000-meter summits of California
