= Mount McDuffie =

Mountain in the state of California

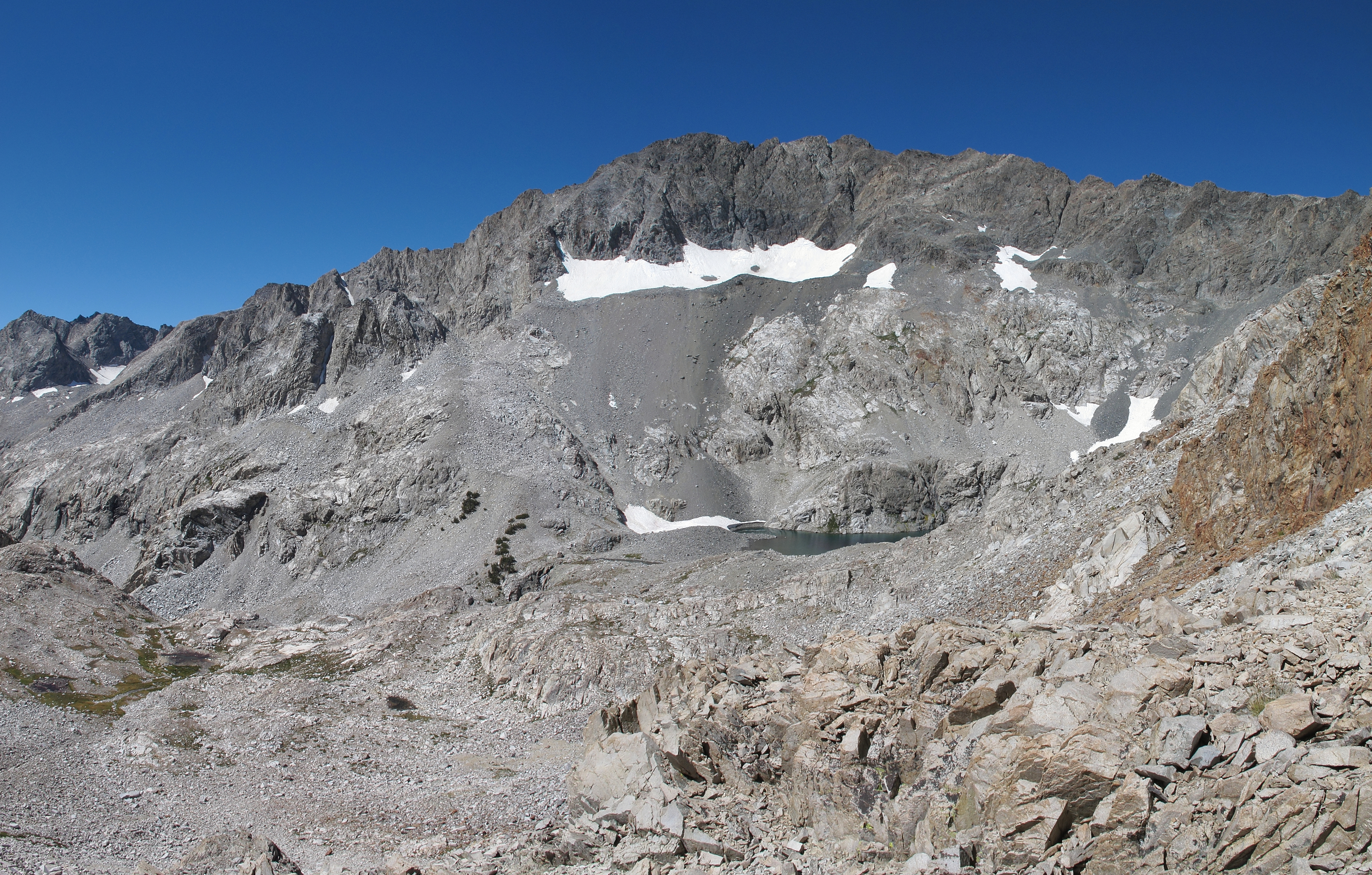
- Northeast aspect

Highest point
- Elevation: 13,291 ft (4,051 m)
- Prominence: 682 ft (208 m)
- Parent peak: Black Giant (13,330 ft)
- Isolation: 1.99 mi (3.20 km)
- Listing: Sierra Peaks Section
- Coordinates: 37°04′25″N 118°38′38″W

Geography
- Location within California Location within the United States
- Location: Kings Canyon National Park; Fresno County; California, U.S.
- Parent range: Sierra Nevada; Black Divide
- Topo map: USGS Mount Goddard

Geology
- Rock type: metamorphic rock

Climbing
- First ascent: July 23, 1951
- Easiest route: class 2

Mount McDuffie is a 13,291-foot-elevation (4,051-meter) mountain summit located west of the crest of the Sierra Nevada mountain range, in Fresno County of central California, United States. This peak is situated in northern Kings Canyon National Park, 1.9 miles (3.1 km) northwest of The Citadel, and two miles south of Black Giant, which is the nearest higher neighbor. McDuffie ranks as the 93rd highest summit in California, and the second-highest point on Black Divide. Topographic relief is significant as it rises nearly 4,900 feet (1,500 meters) above Le Conte Canyon in approximately 2.5 miles. An approach to this remote peak is made possible via the John Muir Trail.

== History ==
This mountain's name honors Duncan McDuffie (1877–1951), to commemorate his interest in the national parks and his work as a conservationist. He was also an accomplished mountaineer in the Sierra Nevada, having made first ascents of Mount Abbot, Bear Creek Spire, and Black Kaweah. Along with James S. Hutchinson and Joseph Nisbet LeConte, he pioneered a high alpine route in 1908 from Yosemite National Park to Kings Canyon, roughly along the route of what would become the John Muir Trail. He served as President of the Sierra Club from 1928 to 1931, and again from 1943 to 1946. The name was officially adopted in 1953 by the United States Board on Geographic Names.

The first ascent of the summit was made July 23, 1951, by Charles Bays Locker, Karl Hufbauer, and Alfred Elkin via the north ridge.

== Climbing ==
Established climbing routes:

- North Ridge – class 2 – First ascent July 23, 1951
- Southeast Ridge – class 2-3 – July 15, 1952, by Charles Bays Locker, Karl Hufbauer, Don Albright, Gary Hufbauer
- Northwest Slope and West Ridge – class 3 – August 1971, by Dave Gladstone
- West Chute – class 3 – August 2, 1974, by Bob Rockwell
- Southwest Ridge – class 2 – August 10, 1989, by Dave Helphrey, Ron Robson, Reiner Stenzel

== Climate ==
Mount McDuffie is located in an alpine climate zone. Most weather fronts originate in the Pacific Ocean, and travel east toward the Sierra Nevada mountains. As fronts approach, they are forced upward by the peaks, causing them to drop their moisture in the form of rain or snowfall onto the range (orographic lift). Precipitation runoff from this mountain drains into tributaries of the Middle Fork Kings River.

== Gallery ==
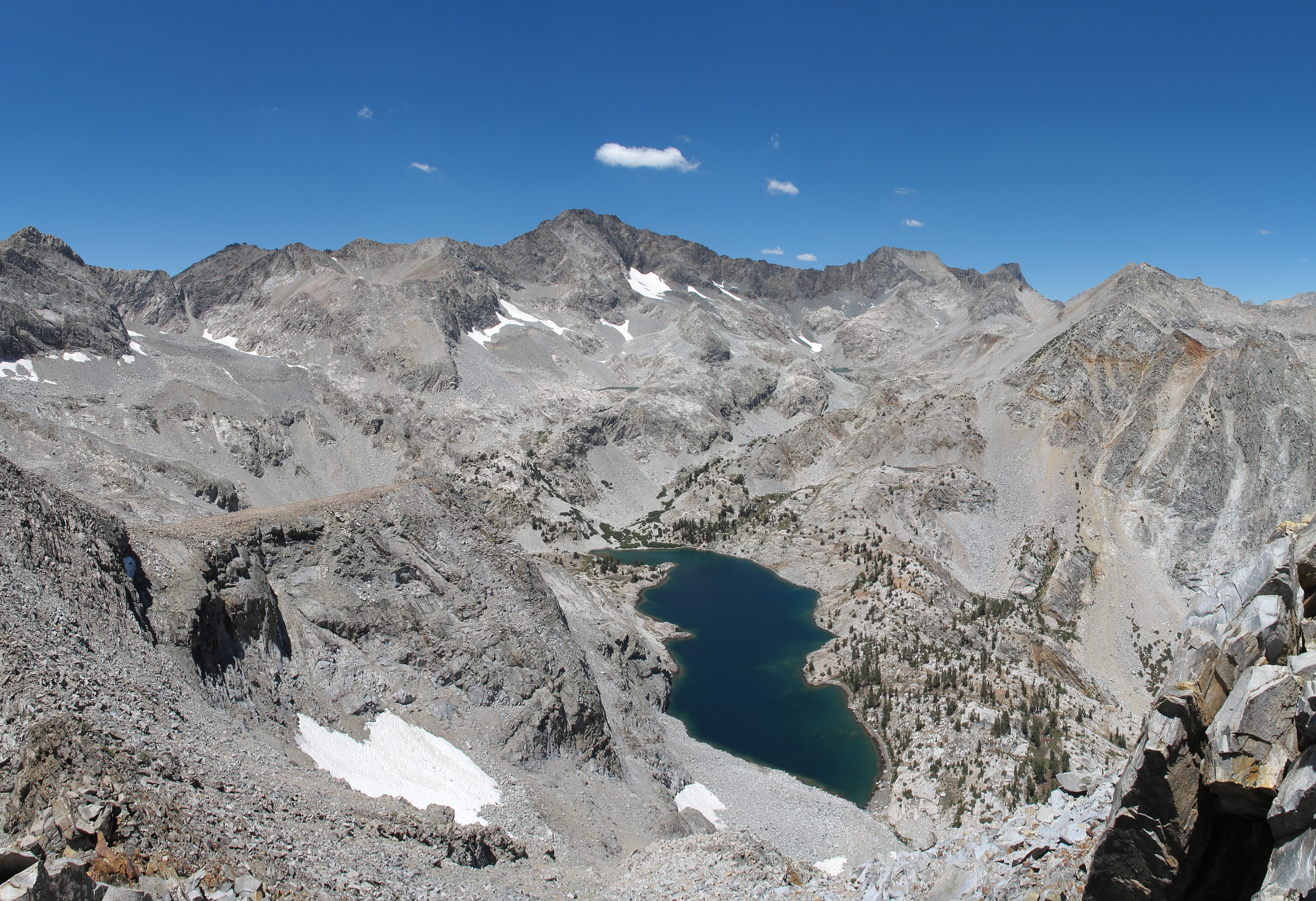
East aspect of Mt. McDuffie viewed from The Citadel. Ladder Lake below.

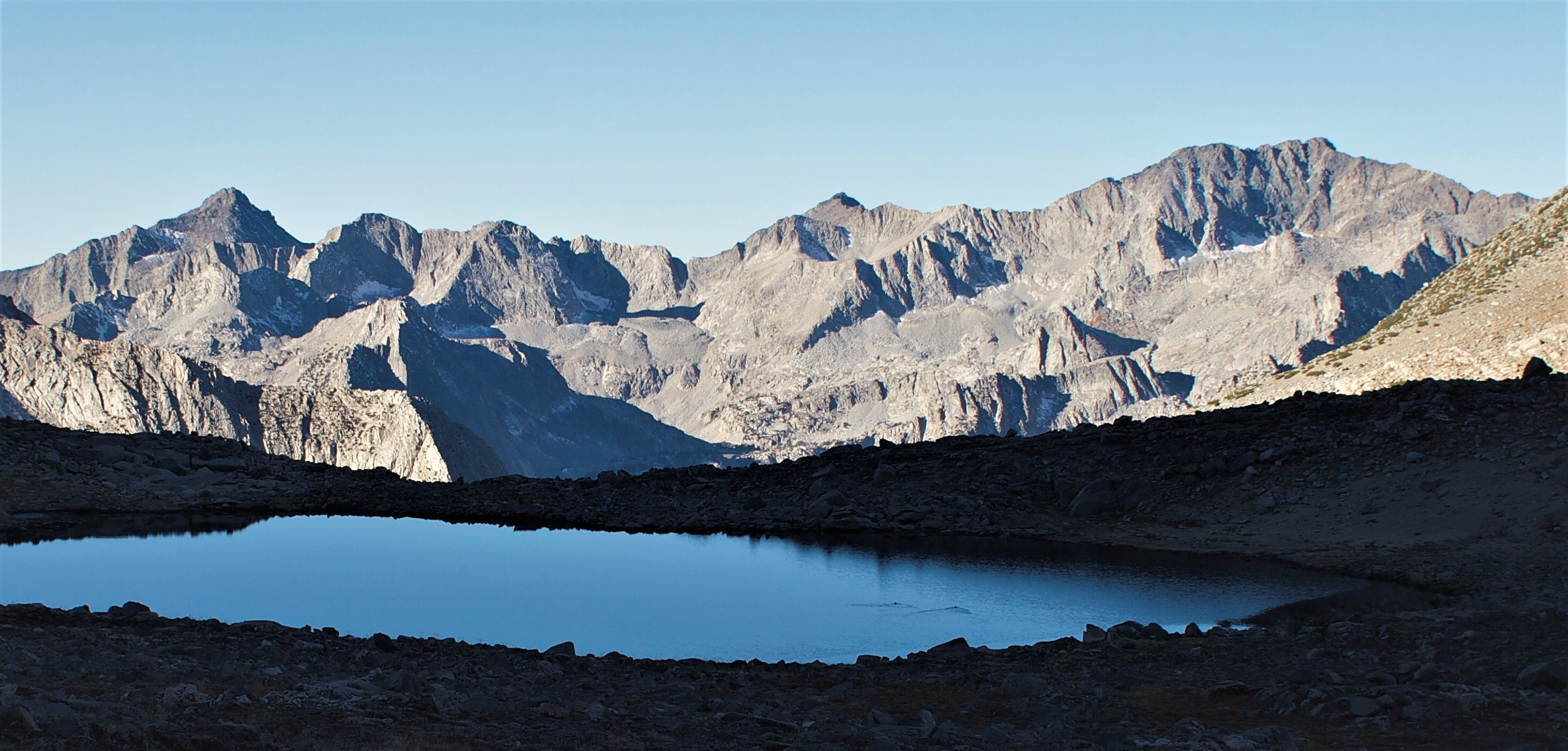
Wheel Mountain (left) and Mount McDuffie (right), from Dusy Basin

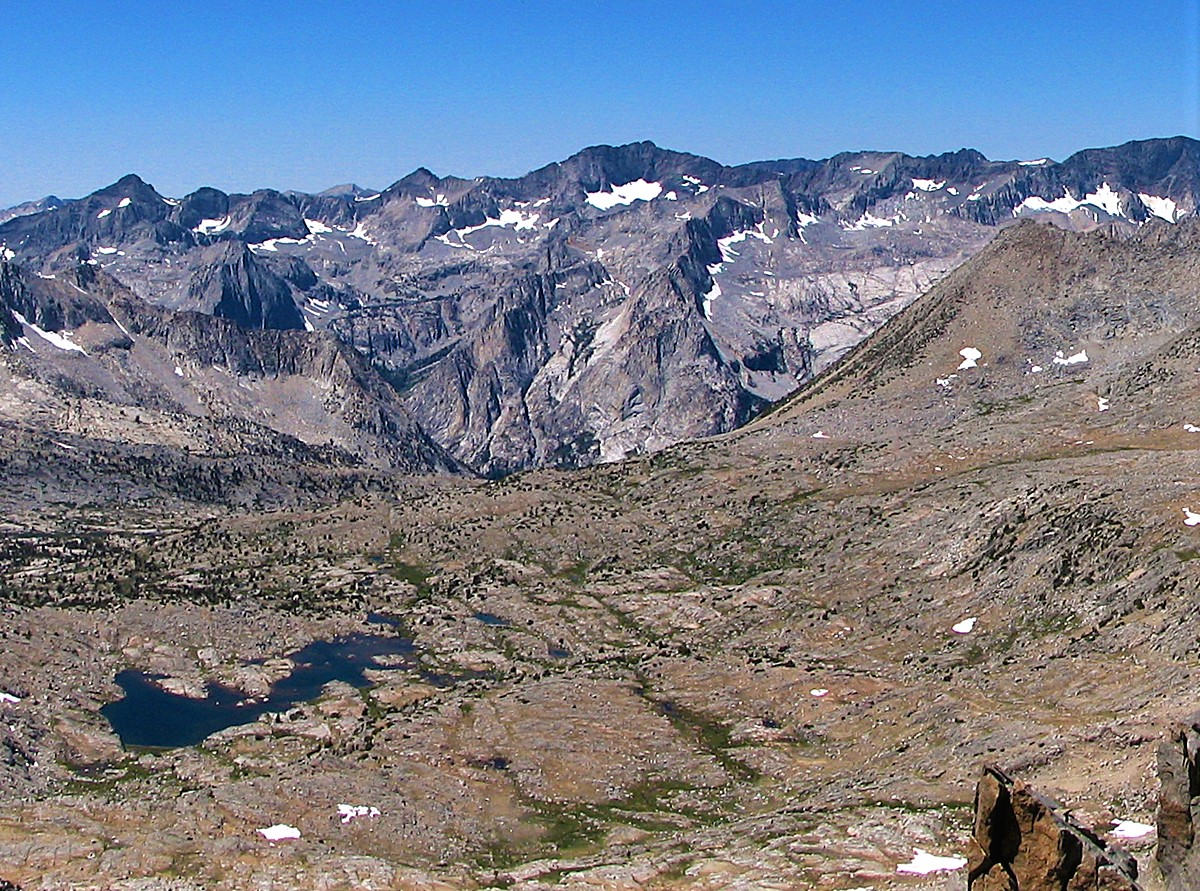
East aspect centered in the distance.
From Mt. Agassiz, with Dusy Basin lower foreground

== See also ==
- List of the major 4000-meter summits of California
