= Scylla (mountain) =

Mountain in the state of California

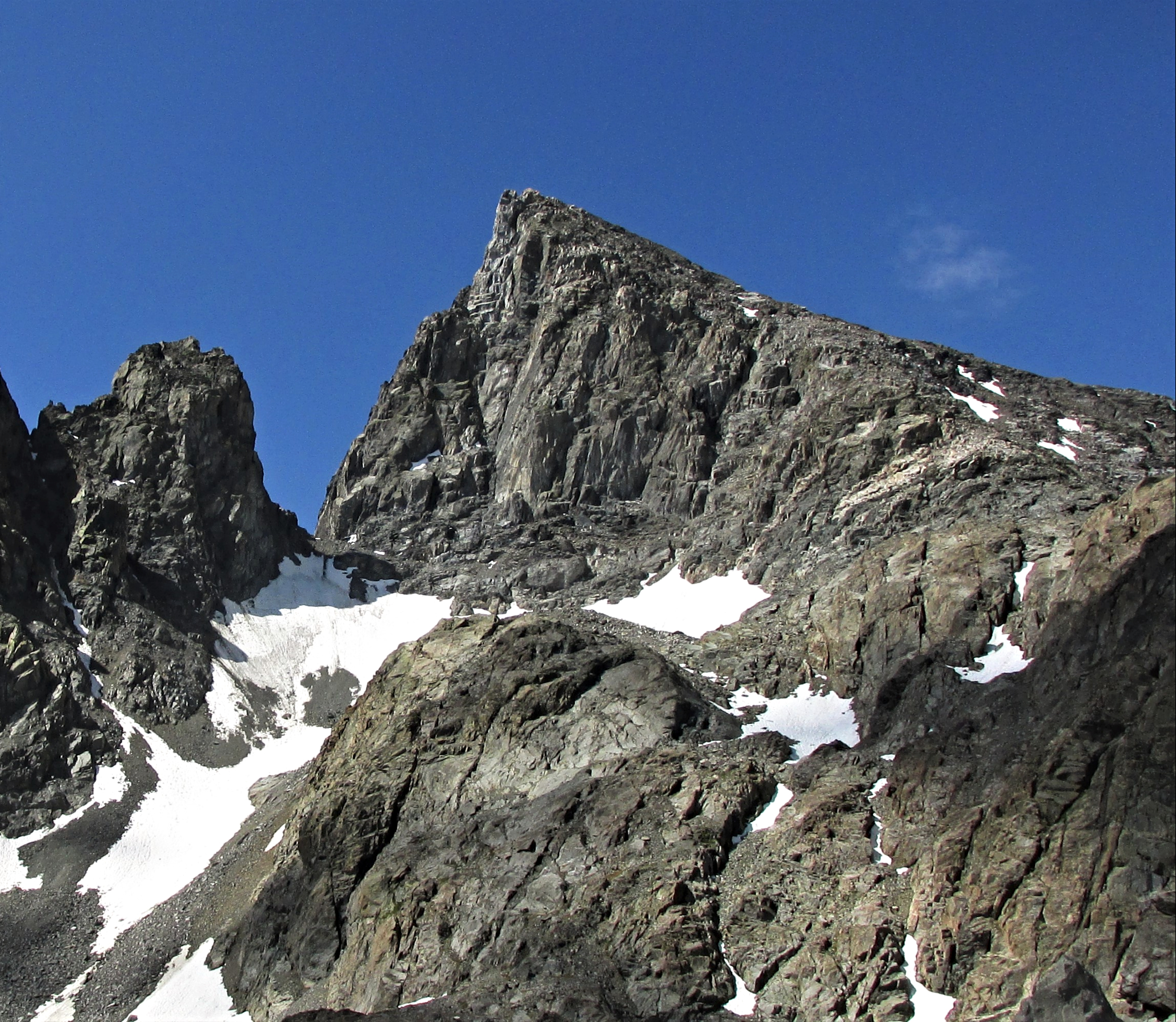
- North aspect

Highest point
- Elevation: 12,956 ft (3,949 m)
- Prominence: 316 ft (96 m)
- Parent peak: Mount Hansen (12,975 ft)
- Isolation: 0.46 mi (0.74 km)
- Listing: Sierra Peaks Section
- Coordinates: 37°04′48″N 118°41′23″W

Naming
- Etymology: Scylla

Geography
- Location within California Location within the United States
- Location: Kings Canyon National Park; Fresno County, California, U.S.
- Parent range: Sierra Nevada
- Topo map: USGS Mount Goddard

Geology
- Rock age: Cretaceous
- Rock type: metamorphic rock

Climbing
- First ascent: July 1934
- Easiest route: class 2 Northwest slope

Scylla is a 12,956-foot-elevation (3,949-meter) mountain summit located west of the crest of the Sierra Nevada mountain range, in Fresno County, California, United States. This peak is situated in Kings Canyon National Park, 1.27 miles (2.04 km) southwest of Charybdis, 2.3 miles (3.7 km) southeast of Mount Goddard, and 2.57 miles (4.14 km) west of Mount McDuffie. Topographic relief is significant as the summit rises 3,150 feet (960 meters) above Enchanted Gorge in approximately one mile. The John Muir Trail provides one possible approach option to this remote peak. An ascent of the peak is non-technical via the northwest slope, and inclusion on the Sierra Peaks Section peakbagging list generates climbing interest in this peak.

== History ==
This mountain's name refers to Scylla, a metamorphic monster in Greek mythology who lives on one side of a narrow channel of water, opposite her counterpart Charybdis. The two sides of the strait are so close that sailors attempting to avoid Charybdis would pass dangerously close to Scylla and vice versa. The name was applied in 1895 by Theodore Solomons and Ernest C. Bonner. Solomons wrote of Enchanted Gorge: "At half-past one this gorge lay directly south of us, and in an hour we had descended to its head, which we found was guarded by a nearby frozen lake, whose sheer, ice-smoothed walls arose on either side, up and up, seemingly into the very sky, their crowns two sharp black peaks of most majestic form. A Scylla and Charybdis they seemed to us, as we stood at the margin of the lake and wondered how we might pass the dangerous portal." The toponym was officially adopted in 1964 by the United States Board on Geographic Names.

The first ascent of the summit was made July 3, 1934, by David Brower and Hervey Voge.

== Climate ==
Scylla is located in an alpine climate zone. Most weather fronts originate in the Pacific Ocean, and travel east toward the Sierra Nevada mountains. As fronts approach, they are forced upward by the peaks (orographic lift), causing them to drop their moisture in the form of rain or snowfall onto the range. Precipitation runoff from this mountain drains into Goddard Creek which is a tributary of the Middle Fork Kings River.

== See also ==
- Sequoia-Kings Canyon Wilderness
