= Devils Crags =

Jagged peak of California's southern Sierra Nevada range

- Devils Crag #1
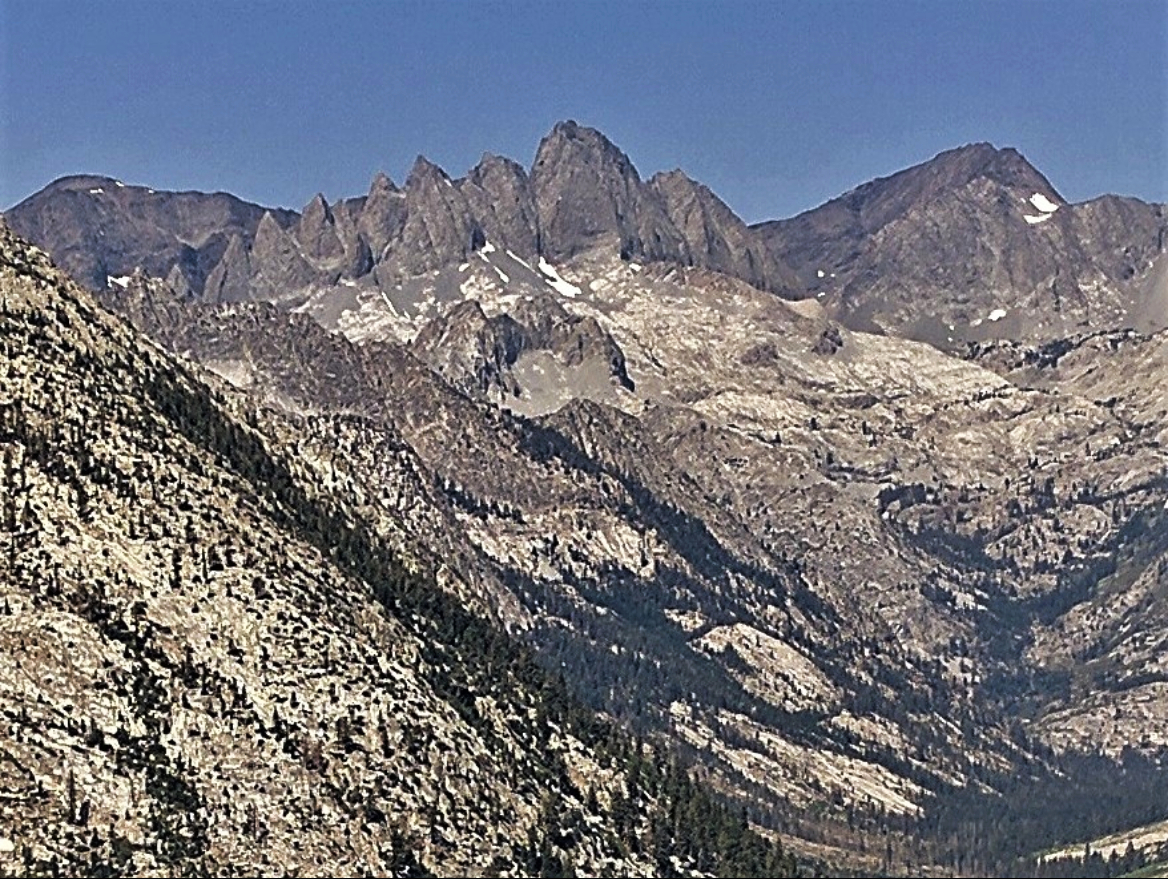
- East aspect, with Wheel Mountain to right

Highest point
- Elevation: 12,424 ft (3,787 m)
- Prominence: 800 ft (240 m)
- Parent peak: Wheel Mountain (12,774 ft)
- Isolation: 1.11 mi (1.79 km)
- Listing: Sierra Peaks Section
- Coordinates: 37°02′17″N 118°36′45″W

Geography
- Location within California Location within the United States
- Country: United States
- State: California
- County: Fresno
- Protected area: Kings Canyon National Park
- Parent range: Sierra Nevada; Black Divide
- Topo map: USGS North Palisade

Geology
- Rock type: metamorphic rock

Climbing
- First ascent: 1913, Charles W. Michael
- Easiest route: class 4+

Devils Crags is a 12,424-foot-elevation (3,787-meter) mountain summit located west of the crest of the Sierra Nevada mountain range, in Fresno County of central California, United States. This jagged line of 11 pinnacles is situated at the southern end of the Black Divide in northern Kings Canyon National Park, 1.88 miles (3.03 km) south of The Citadel, and one mile southeast of Wheel Mountain, which is the nearest higher neighbor. Devils Crags ranks as the 299th highest summit in California. Topographic relief is significant as it rises 4,200 feet (1,300 meters) above Le Conte Canyon in approximately two miles. An approach to this remote peak is made possible via the John Muir Trail which passes through Le Conte Canyon, below to the east. The class 5 Northwest Arête is considered one of the classic climbing routes in the Sierra Nevada.

== History ==
This mountain was bestowed its name in 1906 by Joseph Nisbet LeConte, a Sierra Nevada explorer and cartographer. The name has been officially adopted by the United States Board on Geographic Names.

The first ascent of the highest summit, Crag 1, was made July 21, 1913, by Charles W. Michael, who in addition to being an accomplished climber, was the assistant postmaster at Yosemite Valley.

Crag 2 was first climbed July 25, 1933, by Jules Eichorn, Glen Dawson, and Ted Waller.

Crags 3 and 4 were climbed June 24, 1934, by David Brower, Hervey Voge, and Norman Clyde. The next day, June 25, this same team made the first ascents of Crags 5, 6, 7, and 8.

Crag 9 was first climbed August 1, 1933, by Glen Dawson and Jules Eichorn.

Crags 10 and 11 were first climbed June 23, 1934, by David Brower, Hervey Voge, and Norman Clyde.

== Climbing ==
Established climbing routes for Crag 1:

- Southwest face – 1913 by Charles Michael
- Northwest arête – July 25, 1933, by Jules Eichorn, Helen LeConte, and Alfred Weiler
- Northeast face – August 5, 1938, by Raffi Bedayan, Kenneth Davis, and Jack Riegelhuth

Devils Crag #1 has a bad reputation for unstable rock which has contributed directly to two climbing deaths, Mark Hoffman in 1988, and David Dykeman in 1997.

== Climate ==
Devils Crags is located in an alpine climate zone. Most weather fronts originate in the Pacific Ocean, and travel east toward the Sierra Nevada mountains. As fronts approach, they are forced upward by the peaks, causing them to drop their moisture in the form of rain or snowfall onto the range (orographic lift). Precipitation runoff from this mountain drains into tributaries of the Middle Fork Kings River.

== Gallery ==
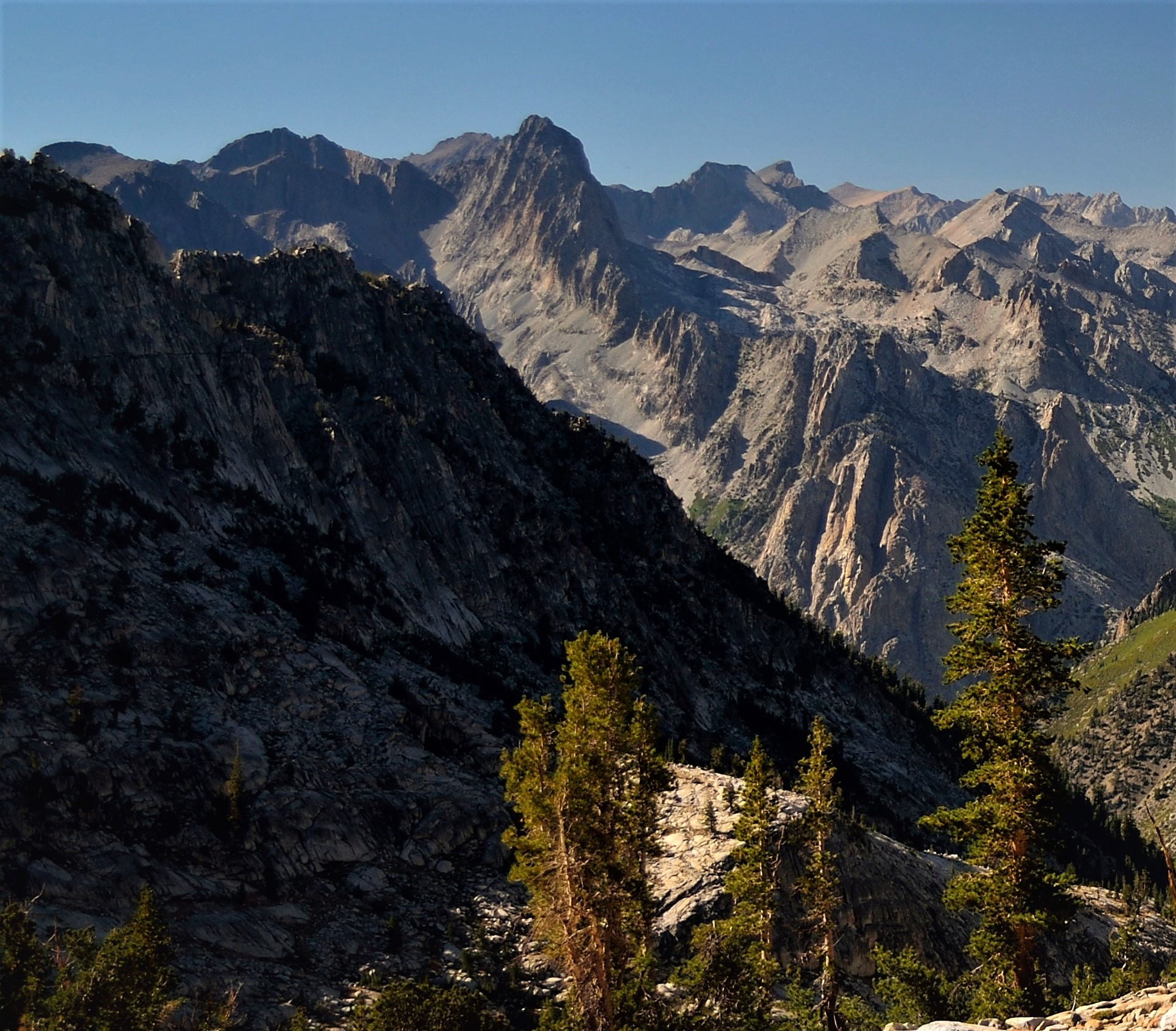
Devils Crags centered and aligned, from southeast.

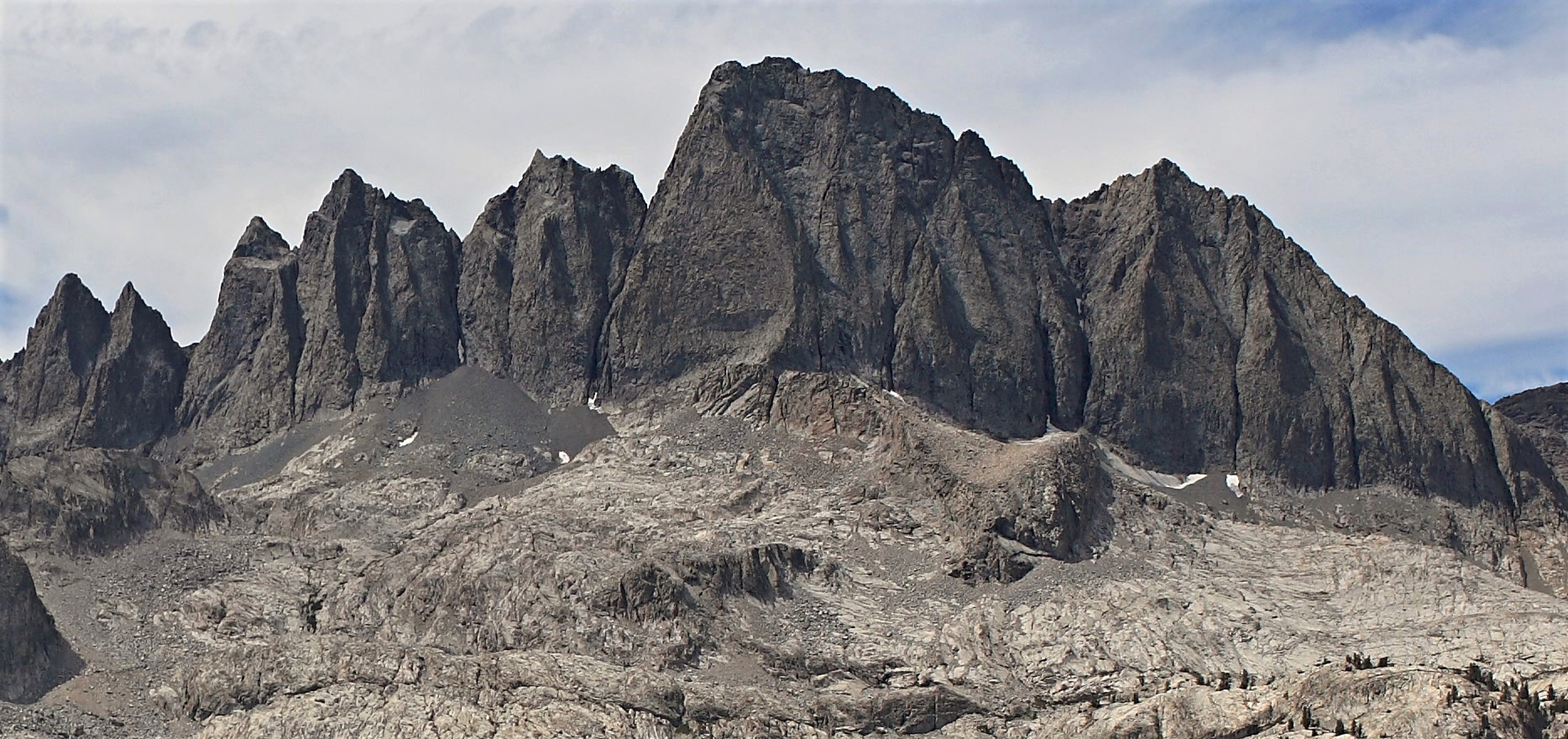

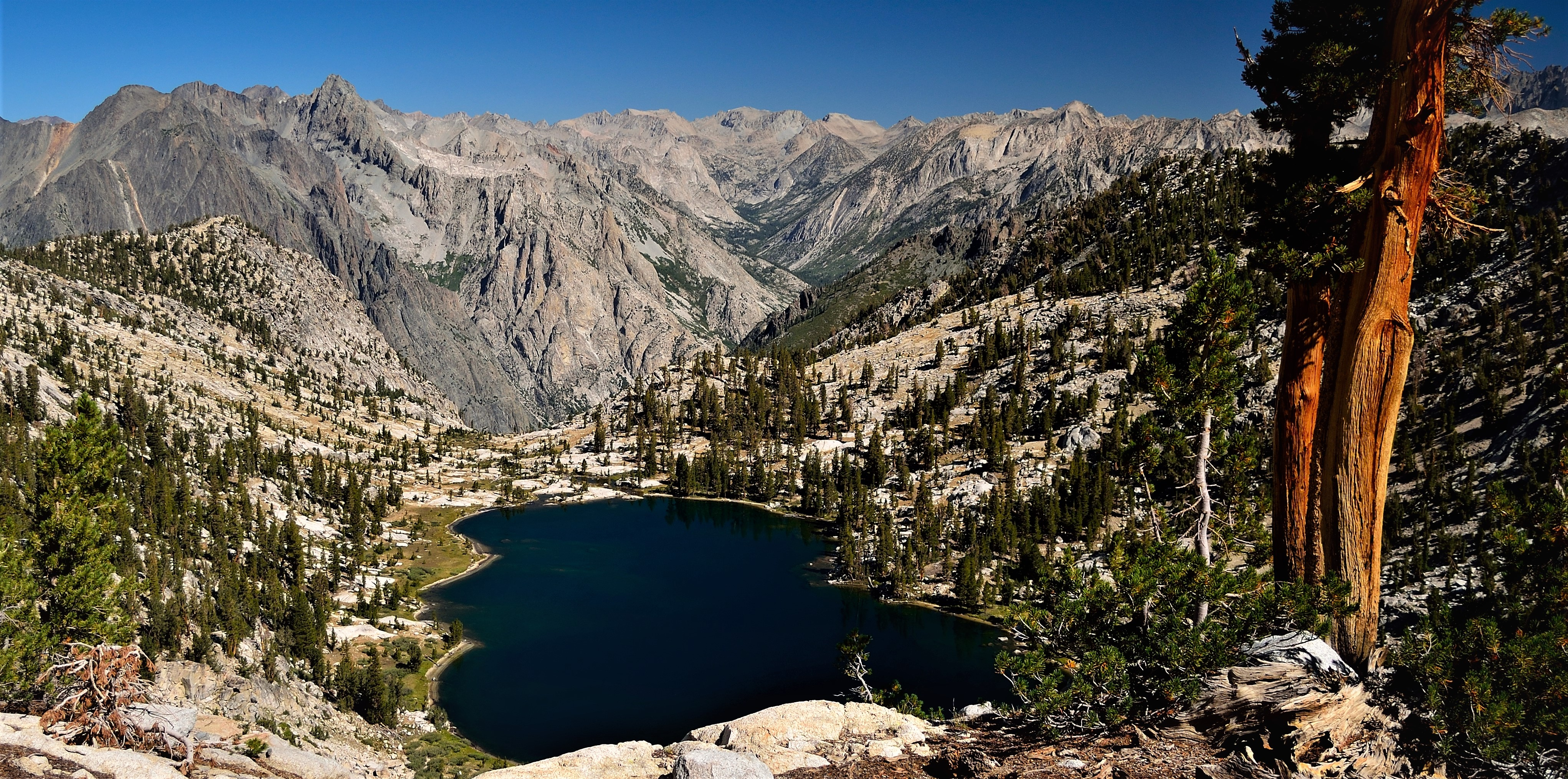
Devils Crags highest peak on left, from southeast

== See also ==
- List of mountain peaks of California
