= Charybdis (mountain) =

Mountain in California, United States

- Location within California

Highest point
- Elevation: 13,102 ft (3,993 m); NAVD88
- Prominence: 1,056 ft (322 m)
- Parent peak: Black Giant
- Isolation: 1.52 mi (2.45 km) to Black Giant
- Listing: Sierra Peaks Section (Mountaineers Peaks)
- Coordinates: 37°5′12″N 118°40′6″W

Naming
- Etymology: Ancient Greek legend of Scylla and Charybdis

Geography
- Country: United States
- State: California
- Parent range: Sierra Nevada

Climbing
- Easiest route: YDS Class 3

Charybdis is a 13,102-foot (3,993 m) mountain in the Sierra Nevada of California. Located deep in the backcountry of Kings Canyon National Park, Charybdis sits at the heart of one of the mountain range's least accessible regions. The shortest approach is 16 miles from the Sabrina Lake trailhead, and requires significant cross-country travel over rugged, exposed class 3 terrain. The shortest approach not requiring extensive cross-country travel is 23 miles long, beginning at the South Lake trailhead. Charybdis and its sister peak Scylla flank the Enchanted Gorge at its upper end, rising from the east and west sides of the gorge, respectively.

Theodore Solomons gave Charybdis its name in 1895 on an expedition through the area. Its name, together with Scylla's, is a reference to the ancient Greek legend of Scylla and Charybdis. In this legend, Scylla and Charybdis are two sea monsters located very close to each other in the narrow Strait of Messina. It was considered impossible to avoid one of the monsters without getting too close to the other.
