= Langille Peak =

Mountain in California, United States

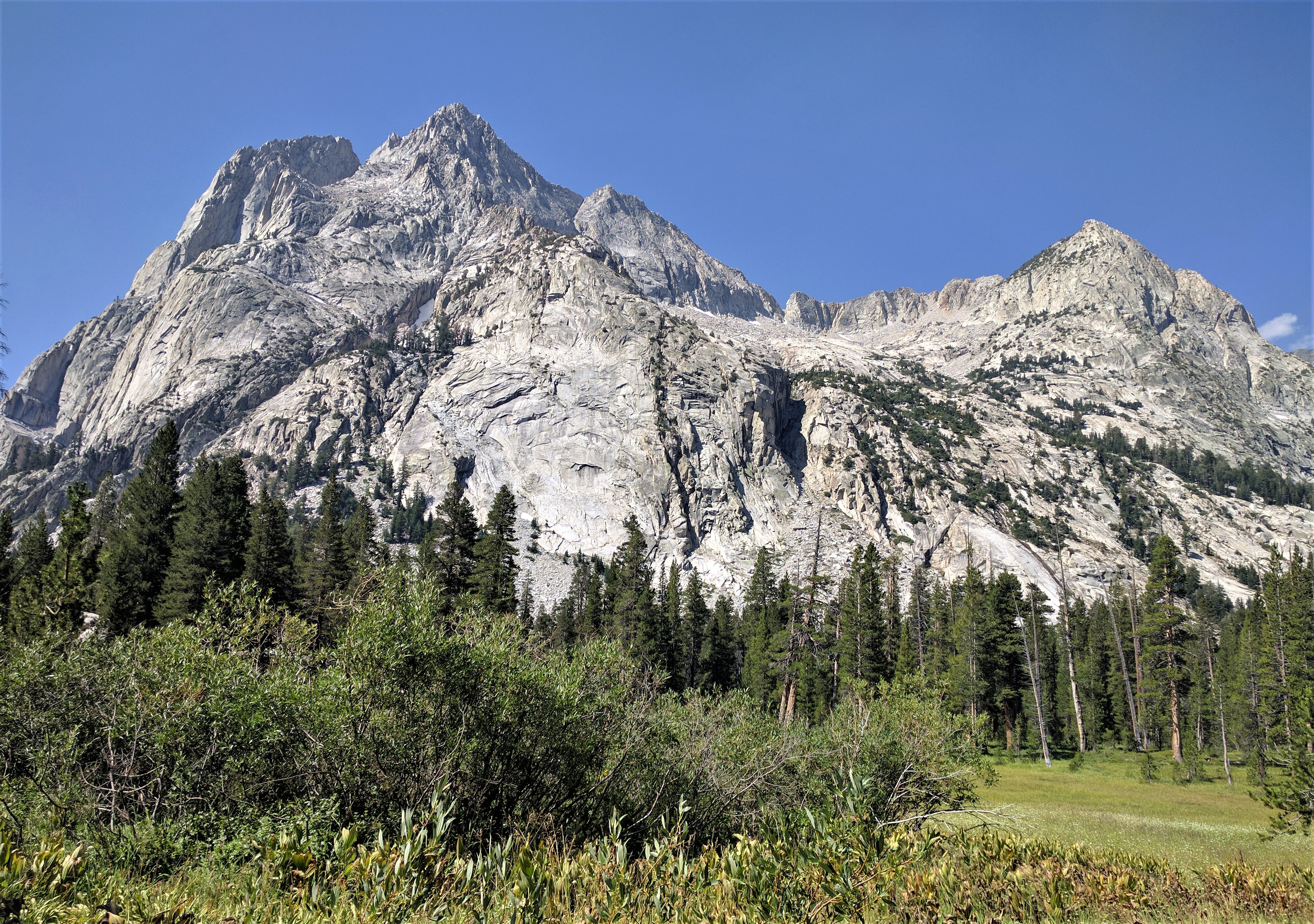
- North aspect from Big Pete Meadow

Highest point
- Elevation: 12,018 ft (3,663 m)
- Prominence: 298 ft (91 m)
- Parent peak: Peak 12100
- Isolation: 0.83 mi (1.34 km)
- Coordinates: 37°06′03″N 118°36′39″W

Naming
- Etymology: Harold Douglas Langille

Geography
- Location within California Location within the United States
- Location: Kings Canyon National Park; Fresno County; California, U.S.
- Parent range: Sierra Nevada
- Topo map: USGS North Palisade

Geology
- Rock type: granite

Climbing
- First ascent: 1926
- Easiest route: class 2 scrambling

Langille Peak is a 12,018-foot-elevation (3,663-meter) mountain summit located west of the crest of the Sierra Nevada mountain range, in Fresno County of central California, United States. It is situated in northern Kings Canyon National Park, 19 miles (31 km) west-southwest of the community of Big Pine, 3 miles (4.8 km) south of Mount Thompson, 2.8 miles (4.5 km) southwest of Mount Goode, and 2.1 miles (3.4 km) east of Black Giant. Topographic relief is significant as the east aspect rises 3,100 feet (940 meters) above Le Conte Canyon in less than one mile. The approach to this remote peak is made via the John Muir Trail.

== History ==
The peak's name (pronounced "Lan'jill") honors Harold Douglas Langille (1874–1954), forest inspector for the General Land Office, Department of the Interior, who visited Sierra Forest Reserve on an inspection tour in 1904. The name was officially adopted by the USGS at the suggestion of Charles Howard Shinn, head ranger of the forest reserve.

The first ascent of the summit was made in August 1926 by Nathaniel L. Goodrich, Marjory Hurd, and Dean Peabody, Jr. via the West Ridge.

== Climbing ==
Established climbing routes:

- West Ridge – class 2 – First ascent 1926
- East Buttress – class 4-5 – FA 1970
- Southeast Face – class 4 – FA 1971
- Southwest Slope – class 2 – FA 2003

== Climate ==
According to the Köppen climate classification system, Langille Peak is located in an alpine climate zone. Most weather fronts originate in the Pacific Ocean, and travel east toward the Sierra Nevada mountains. As fronts approach, they are forced upward by the peaks, causing them to drop their moisture in the form of rain or snowfall onto the range (orographic lift). Precipitation runoff from this mountain drains into the Middle Fork Kings River.

== Gallery ==
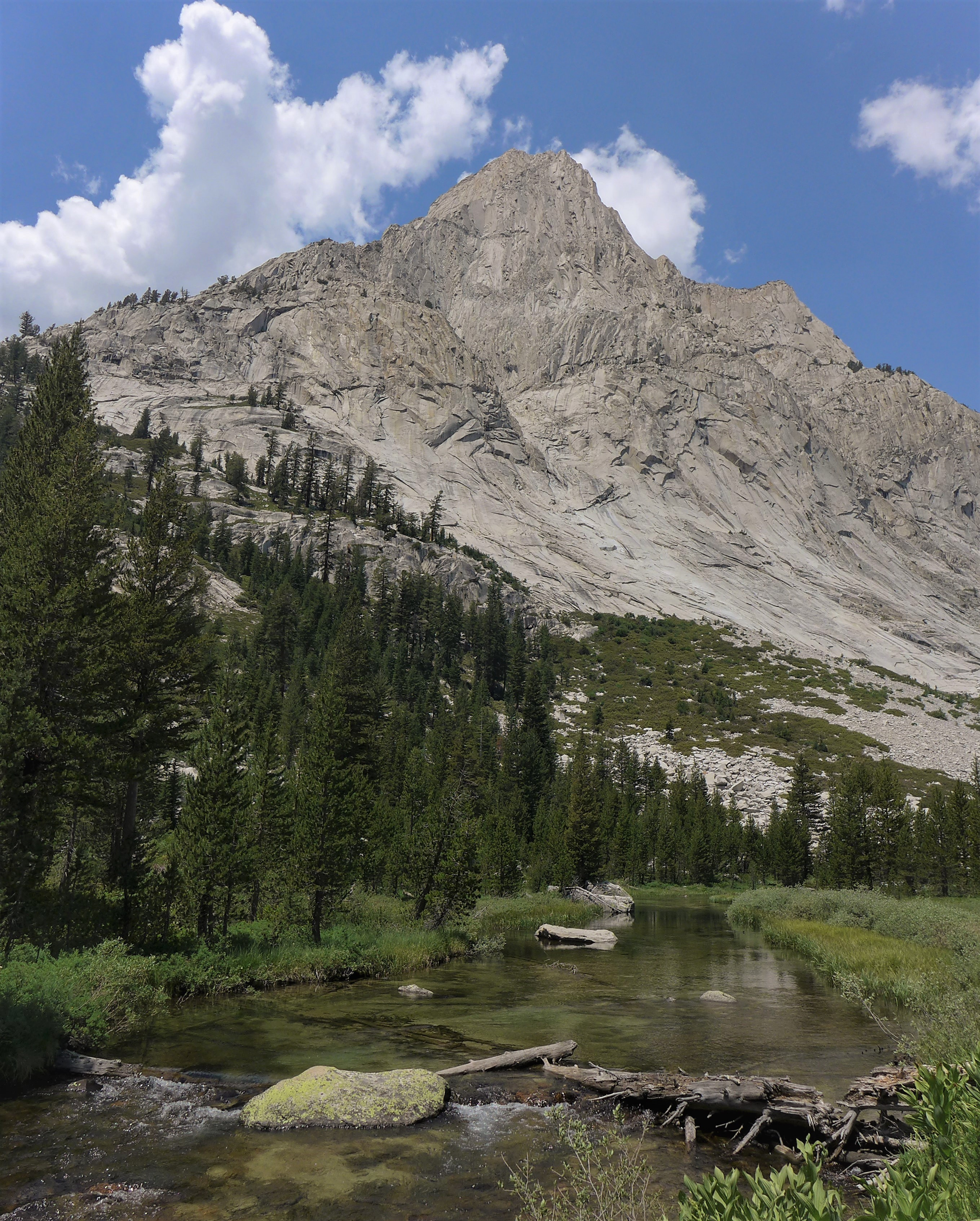
Langille Peak, east aspect]

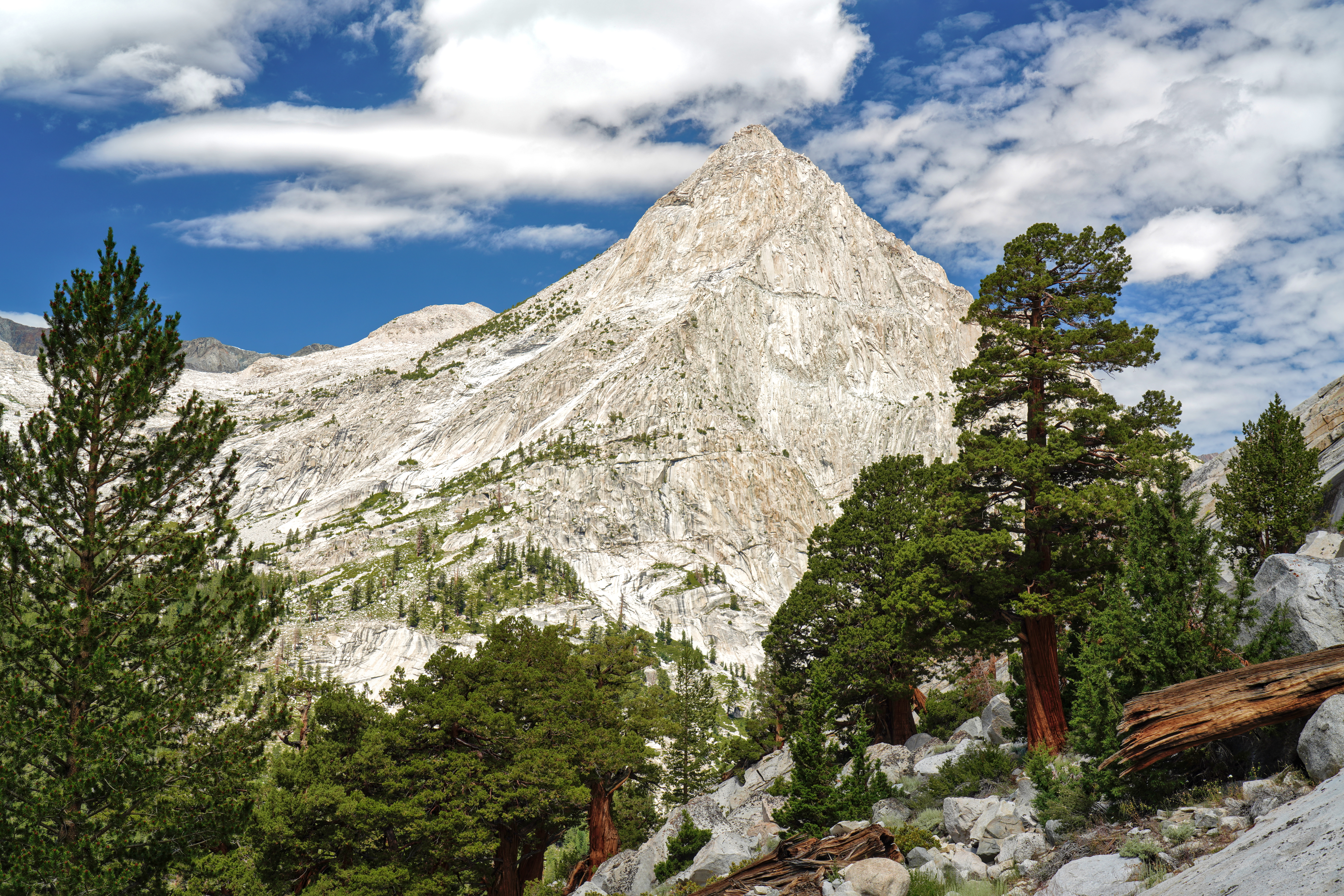
ESE aspect

== See also ==
- List of mountain peaks of California
