= The Citadel (Sierra Nevada) =

Mountain in California, United States

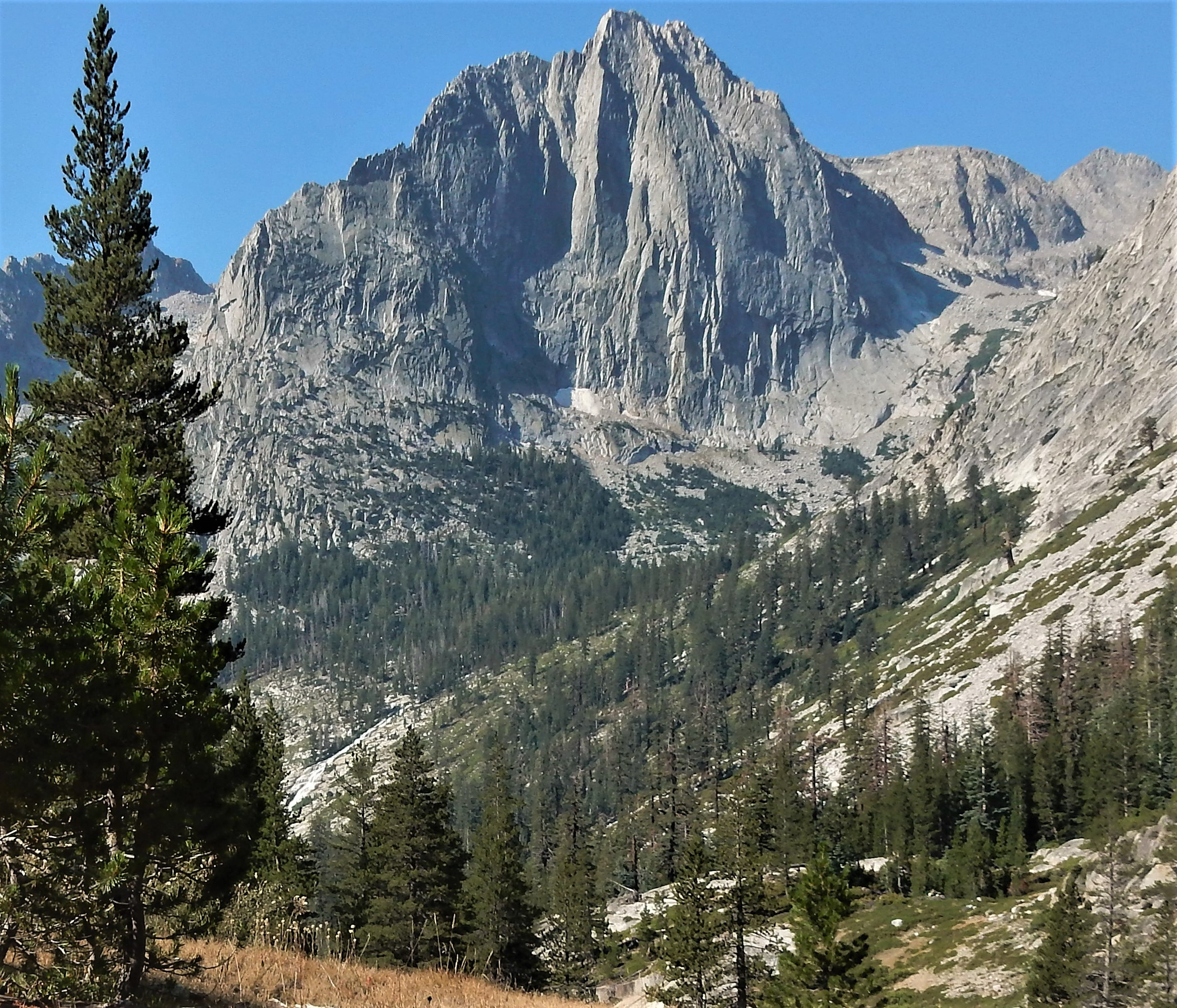
- The Citadel viewed from the northeast, on the John Muir Trail in Le Conte Canyon

Highest point
- Elevation: 11,738 ft (3,578 m)
- Prominence: 298 ft (91 m)
- Parent peak: Peak 12020
- Isolation: 0.54 mi (0.87 km)
- Coordinates: 37°03′55″N 118°36′40″W

Geography
- Location within California Location within the United States
- Location: Kings Canyon National Park; Fresno County; California, U.S.
- Parent range: Sierra Nevada
- Topo map: USGS North Palisade

Geology
- Rock type: granite

Climbing
- First ascent: June 24, 1951
- Easiest route: class 2, from Ladder Lake

The Citadel is an 11,738-foot-elevation (3,578-meter) mountain summit located in the Sierra Nevada mountain range, in Fresno County of central California, United States. It is situated in northern Kings Canyon National Park, 20 miles (32 km) west-southwest of the community of Big Pine, and 2.4 miles (3.9 km) south of Langille Peak. Topographic relief is significant as it rises 3,400 feet (1,000 meters) above Le Conte Canyon in approximately one mile. The long approach to this remote peak is made via the John Muir Trail. The Northeast Arête, also known as Edge of Time Arête, is considered one of the classic climbing routes in the Sierra Nevada.

== Climate ==
According to the Köppen climate classification system, The Citadel is located in an alpine climate zone. Most weather fronts originate in the Pacific Ocean, and travel east toward the Sierra Nevada mountains. As fronts approach, they are forced upward by the peaks, causing them to drop their moisture in the form of rain or snowfall onto the range (orographic lift). Precipitation runoff from this mountain drains into the Middle Fork Kings River.

== Climbing ==
Non-technical routes:

- West Ridge – class 2 – First ascent June 24, 1951, by Richard Searle, William Wirt
- Northeast Face – class 4 – FA by Donald Goodrich, Robert Means also on June 24, 1951
- North Wall – class 4 – FA by Locker, Albright, G. Hufbauer, and K. Hufbauer

Established rock climbing routes:

- North Face – class 5.7 A3 – FA 1968 by T. M. Herbert, Don Lauria, Dennis Hennick
- Edge of Time Arête – class 5.10+ – 14 pitches – FA 1991 by Dave Nettle and Jim Howle
- Quality Time – class 5.10b – 9 pitches – FA 2003 by Urmas Franosch, Peter Mayfield
- Wild Kingdom – class 5.11- – 16 pitches – FA 2019 by Katie Lambert, Ben Ditto

== Gallery ==
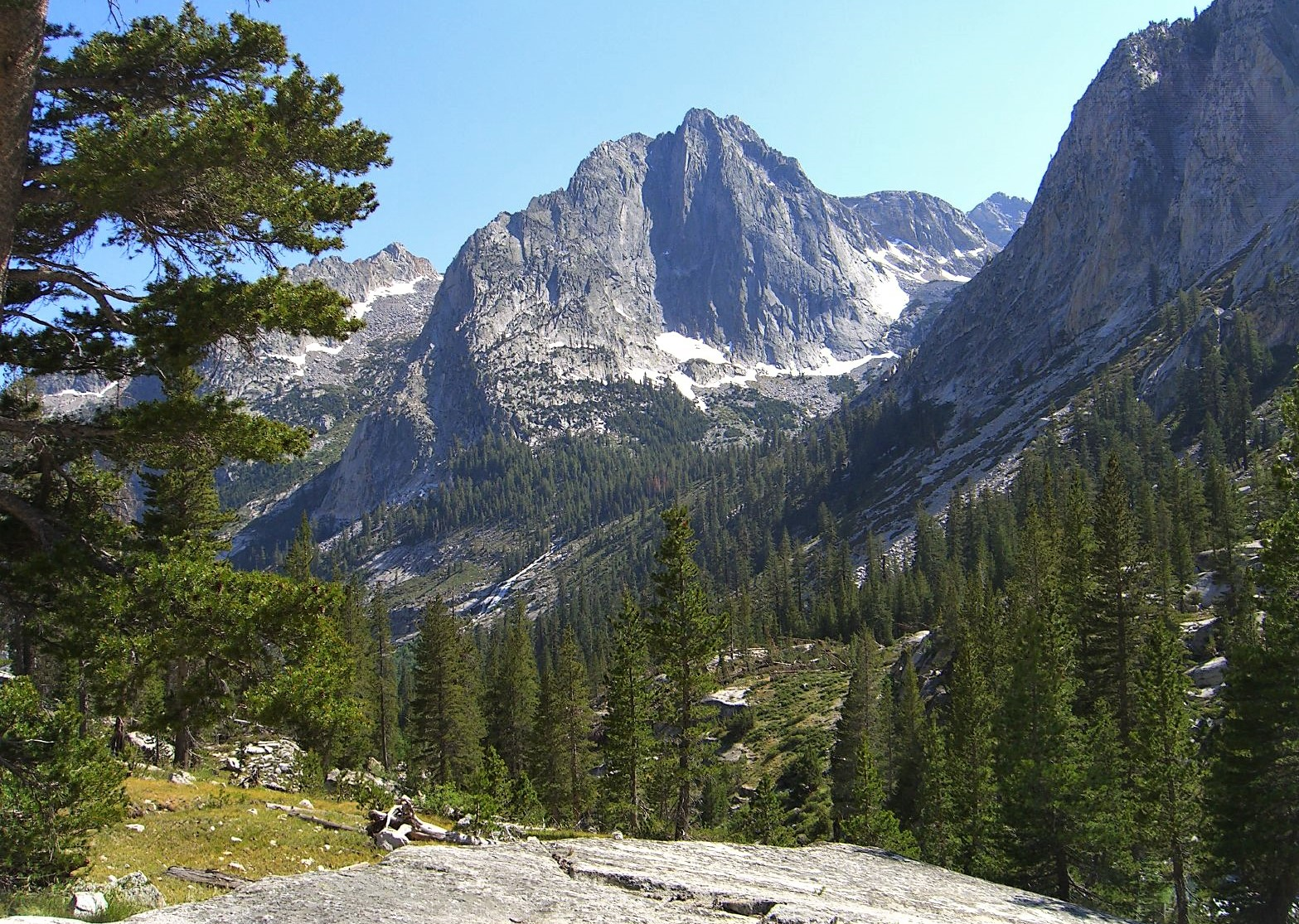

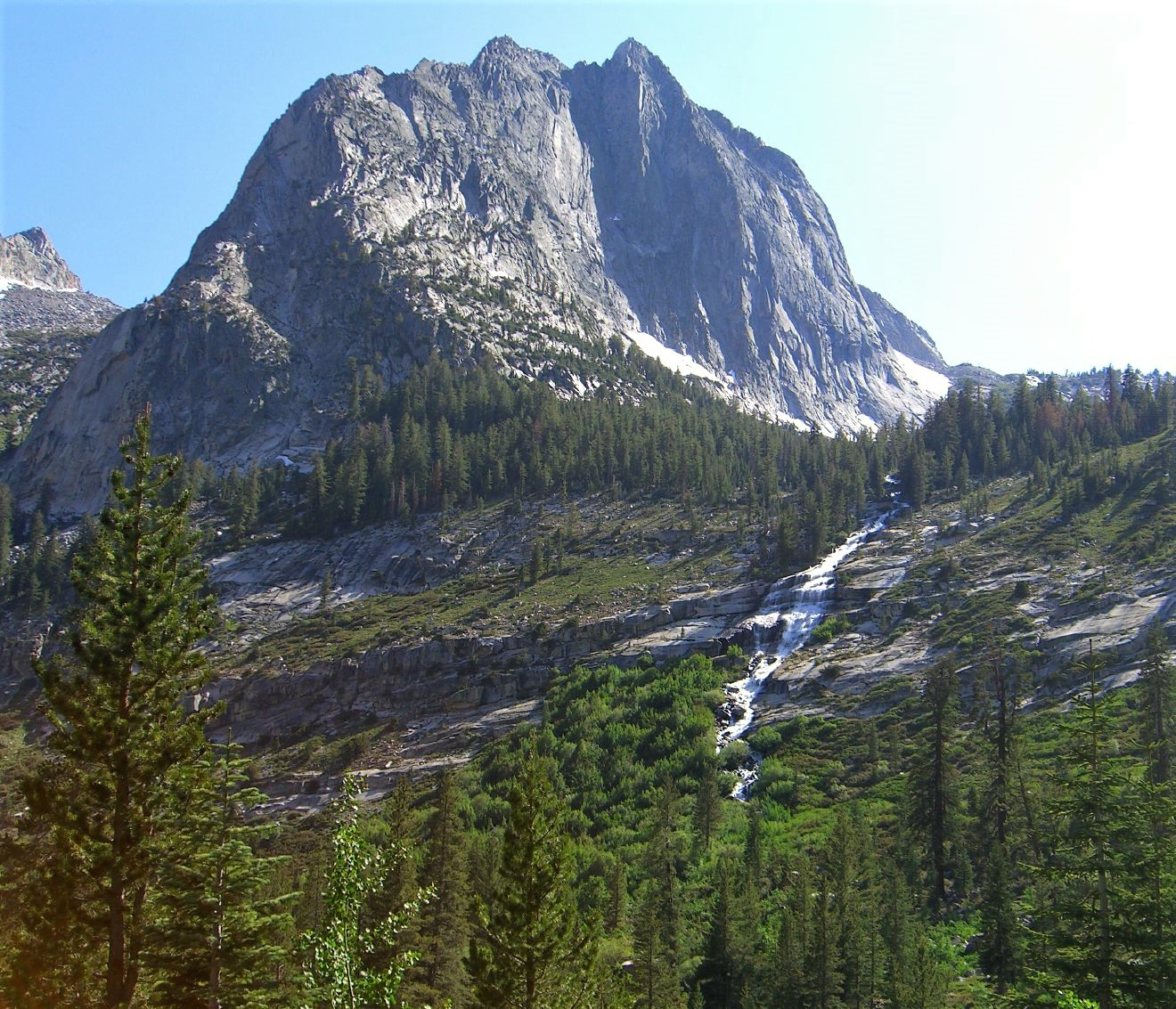
The Citadel with cascade

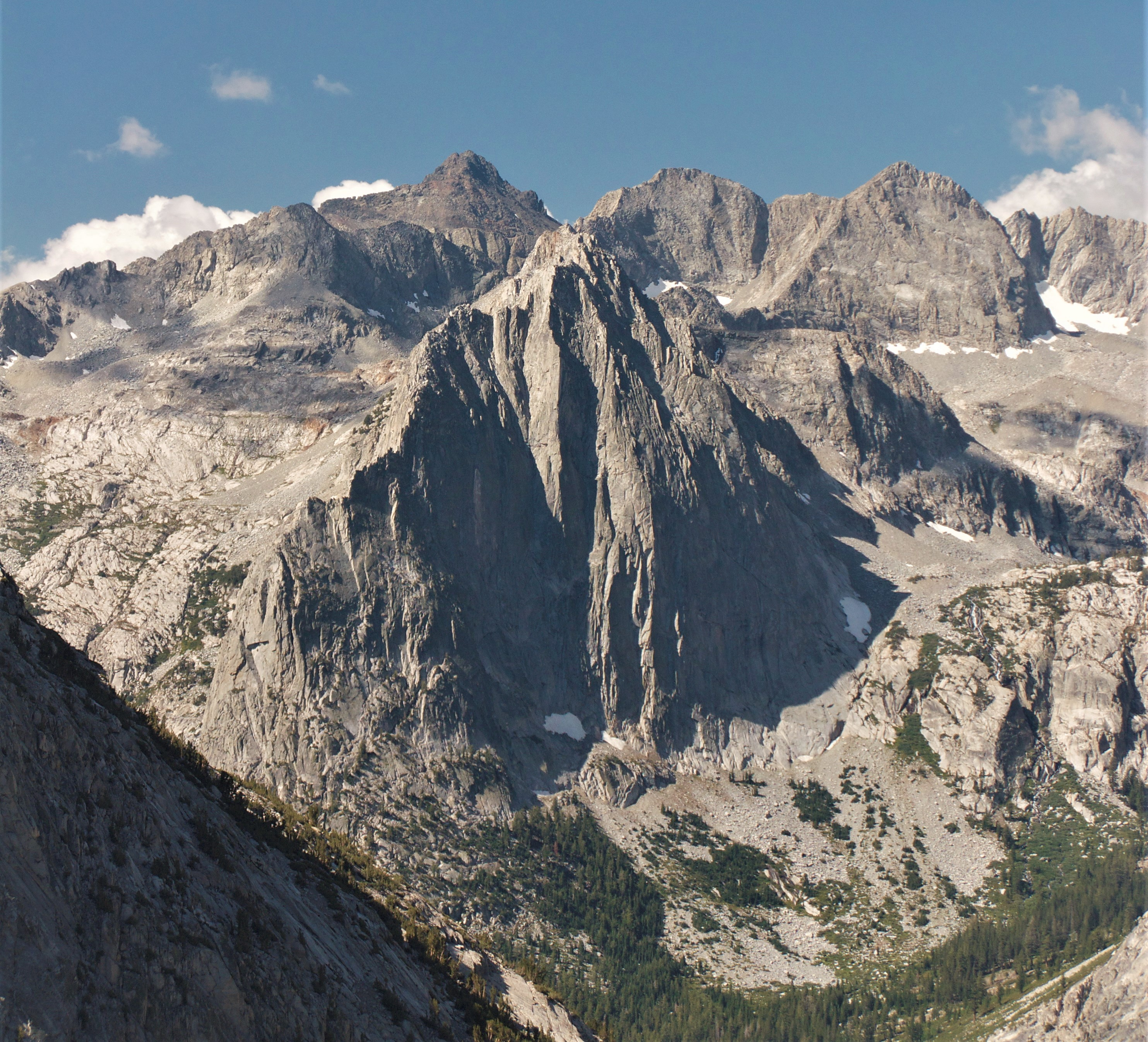
The Citadel (centered) and Wheel Mountain (behind, left)

== See also ==
- List of mountain peaks of California
