= Wheel Mountain =

Mountain in the state of California

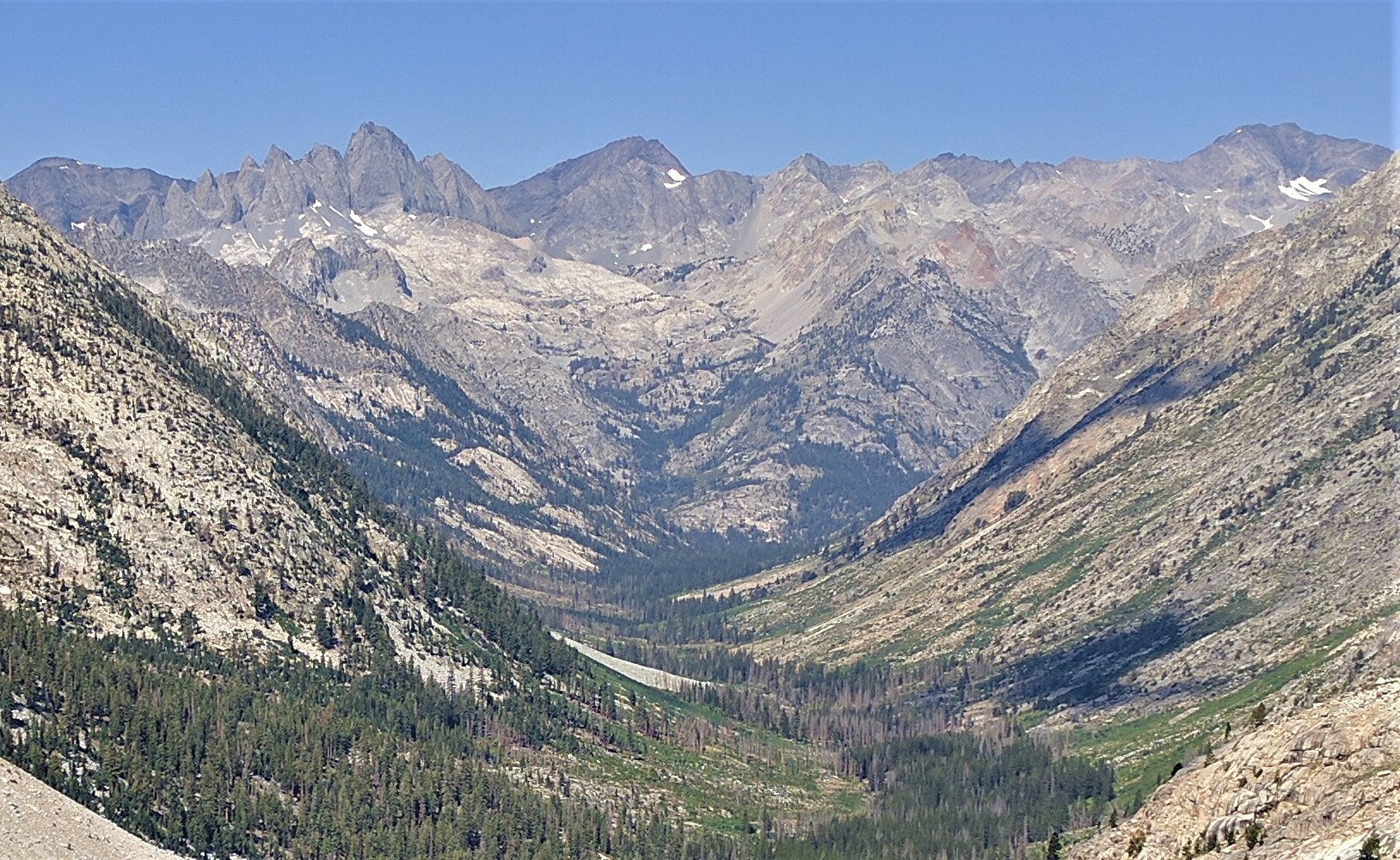
- Looking west with Wheel Mountain at center. (Devils Crags to left, Mt. McDuffie far right)

Highest point
- Elevation: 12,774 ft (3,894 m)
- Prominence: 734 ft (224 m)
- Parent peak: Mount McDuffie (13,282 ft)
- Isolation: 2.03 mi (3.27 km)
- Listing: Sierra Peaks Section
- Coordinates: 37°02′48″N 118°37′46″W

Geography
- Location within California Location within the United States
- Location: Kings Canyon National Park; Fresno County, California, U.S.
- Parent range: Sierra Nevada; Black Divide
- Topo map: USGS Mount Goddard

Geology
- Rock type: metamorphic rock

Climbing
- First ascent: 1933
- Easiest route: class 3

Wheel Mountain is a 12,774-foot-elevation (3,894-meter) mountain summit located west of the crest of the Sierra Nevada mountain range, in Fresno County of central California, United States. This mountain is situated on the Black Divide in northern Kings Canyon National Park, one mile northwest of Devils Crags, and two miles south-southeast of Mount McDuffie, which is the nearest higher neighbor. Wheel Mountain ranks as the 216th-highest summit in California, and the fifth-highest on Black Divide. Topographic relief is significant as the west aspect rises 4,500 feet (1,400 meters) above Enchanted Gorge in approximately 1.5 mile, and the east aspect rises 4,500 feet above Le Conte Canyon in 2.5 miles. An approach to this remote peak is made possible via the John Muir Trail.

== History ==
The first ascent of the summit was made July 26, 1933, by Lewis Clark, Marjory Bridge, John Poindexter, and John Cahill. This group also bestowed its name based on "the peculiar structure of the summit, which consists of four steep buttresses radiating symmetrically from the hub like the spokes of a wheel." This mountain's name has been officially adopted by the United States Board on Geographic Names.

== Climate ==
Wheel Mountain is located in an alpine climate zone. Most weather fronts originate in the Pacific Ocean, and travel east toward the Sierra Nevada mountains. As fronts approach, they are forced upward by the peaks, causing them to drop their moisture in the form of rain or snowfall onto the range (orographic lift). Precipitation runoff from this mountain drains into tributaries of the Middle Fork Kings River.

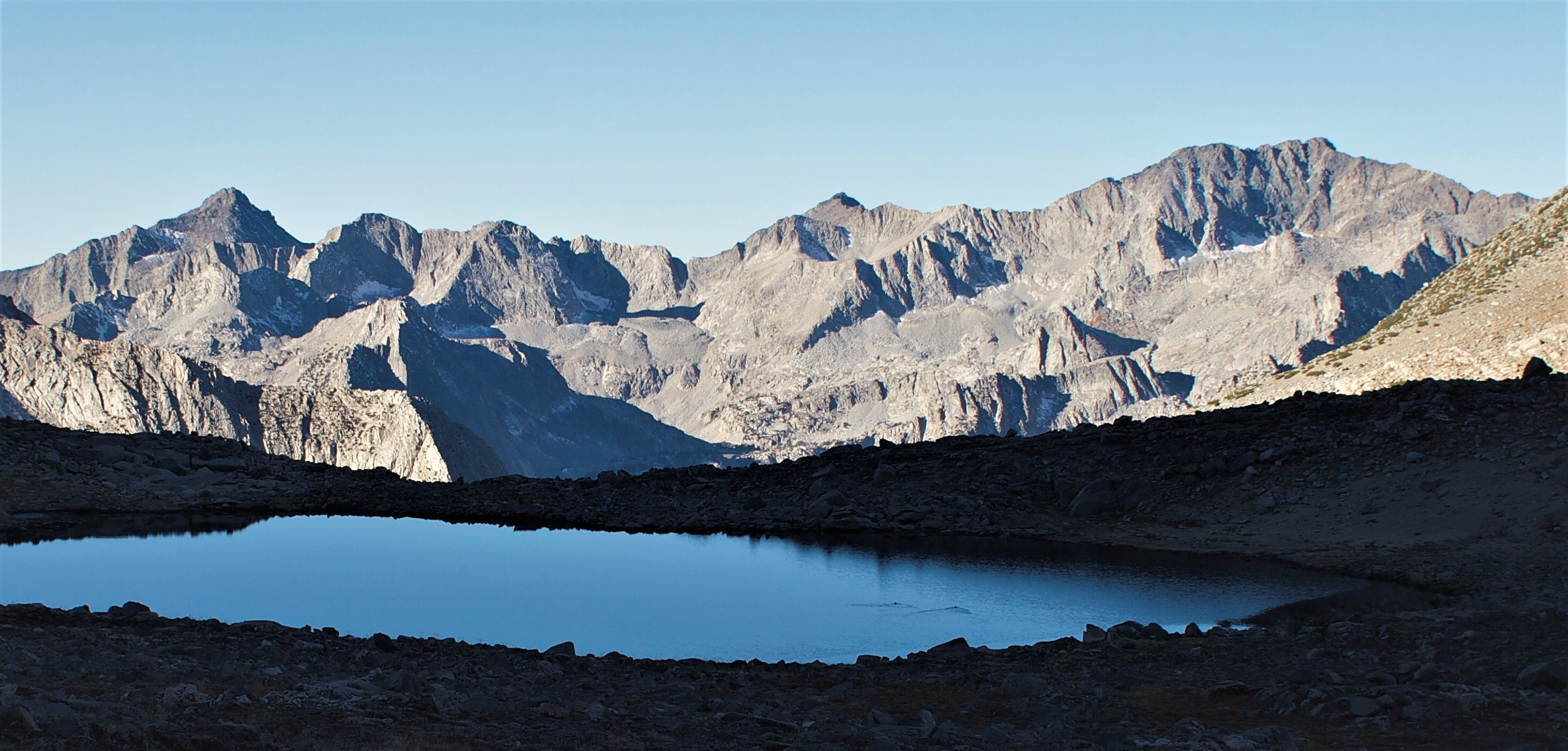
Wheel Mountain (left) and Mount McDuffie (right), from Dusy Basin

== See also ==
- List of mountain peaks of California
