= Muir Pass =

Mountain pass in the Sierra Nevada, California

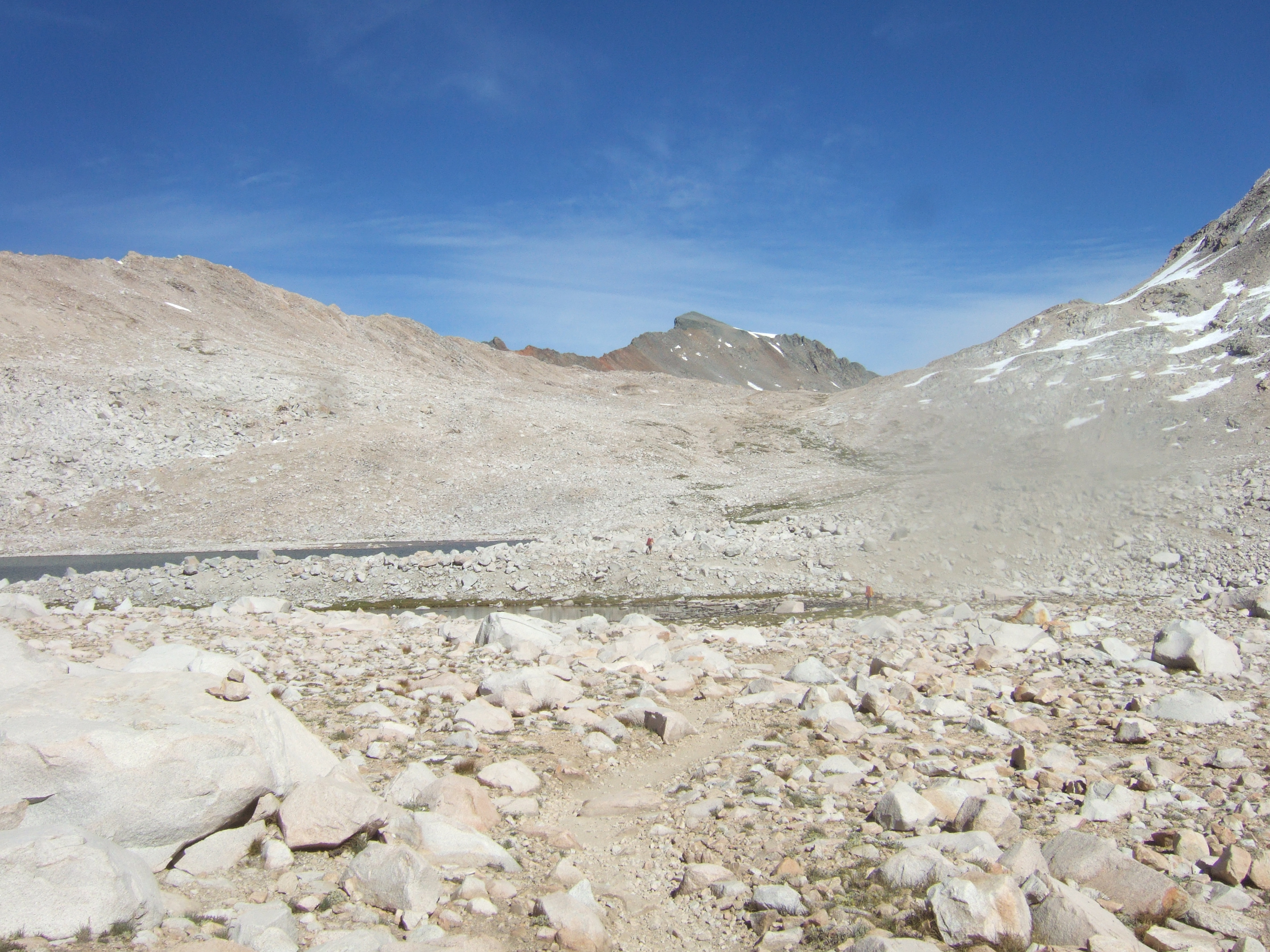
- Black Giant behind Muir Pass

- Location within California
- Elevation: 11,955 feet (3,644 m)
- Traversed by: John Muir Trail, Pacific Crest Trail

Third Approach
- Location: Fresno County, California, United States
- Range: Sierra Nevada
- Coordinates: 37°06′42″N 118°40′14″W

Muir Pass is a mountain pass in the Sierra Nevada of California, United States, in Kings Canyon National Park. It is named for John Muir.

The pass is near the midway point of the John Muir Trail and around mile 841 of the Pacific Crest Trail. It crosses the Goddard Divide between Mount Solomons and Mount Warlow, at an elevation of 11,955 feet (3,644 m). The Muir Hut, built by the Sierra Club, is at the summit of the pass. Although the grade is gentle from both directions, snow can persist well into the summer, obscuring the trail for miles.

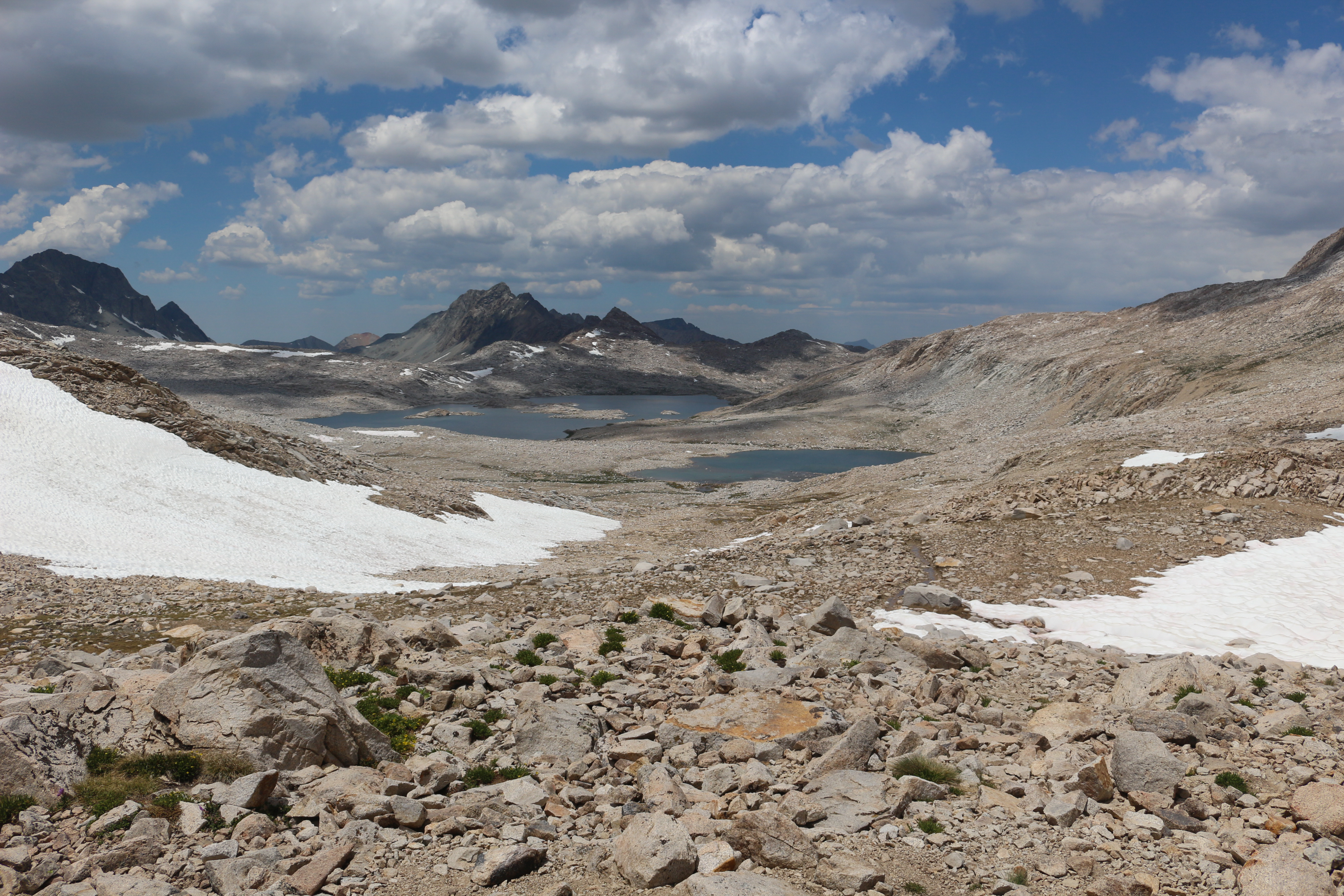
View of Mount McGee, Lake McDermand and Wanda Lake, ascending the pass

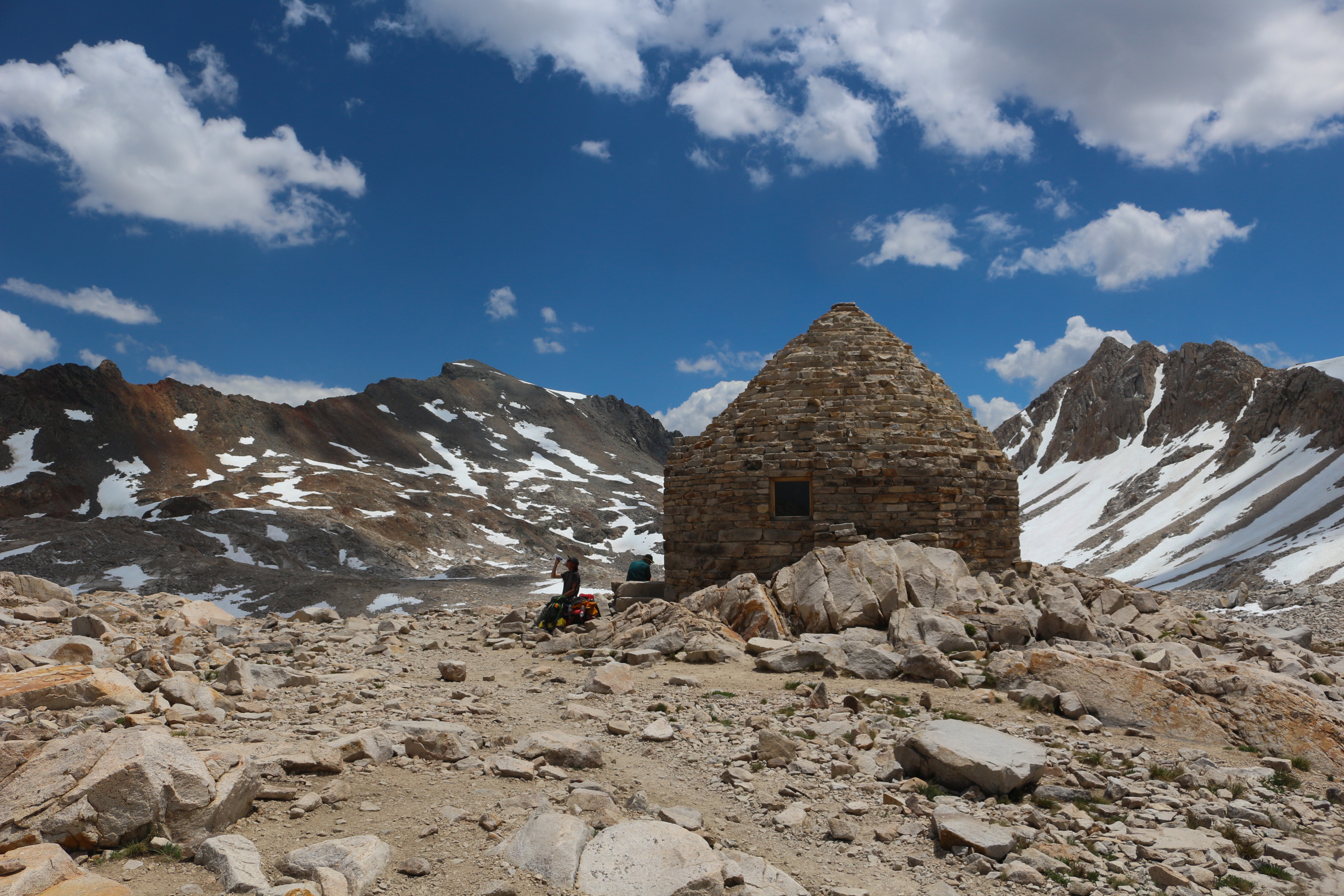
The Muir Hut

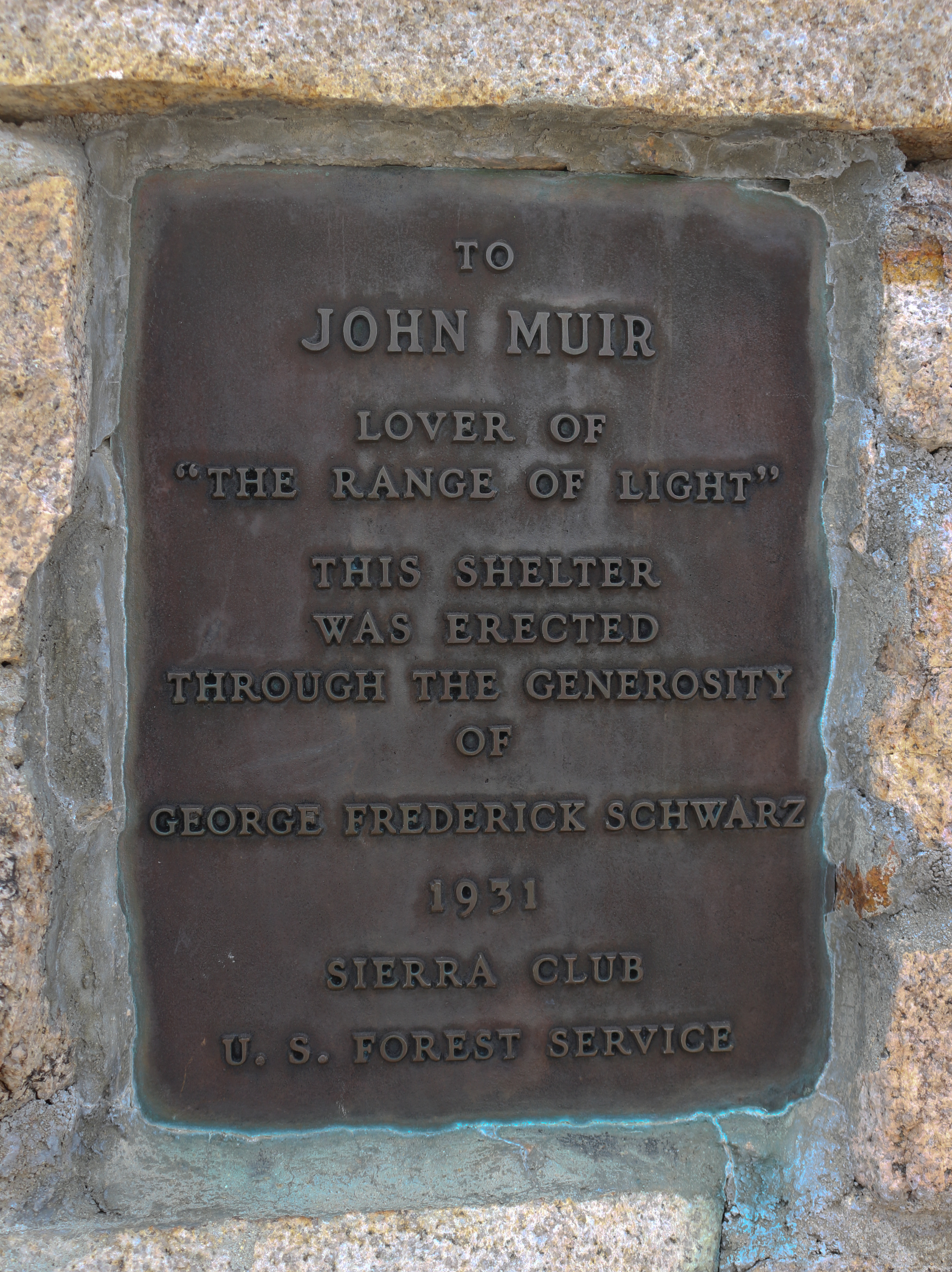
Commemorative on the Hut

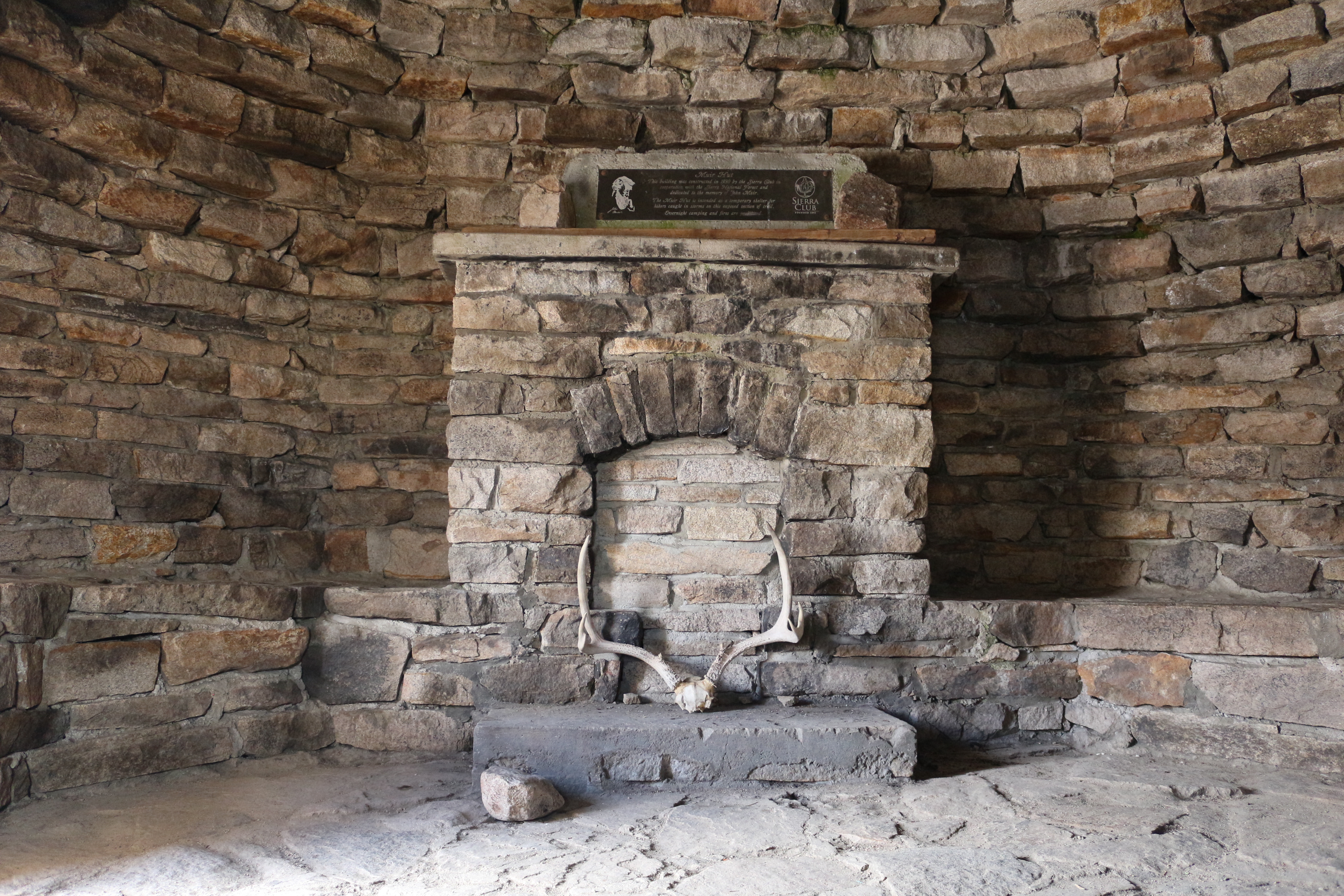
Inside the hut
