= Black Giant =

Mountain in the state of California

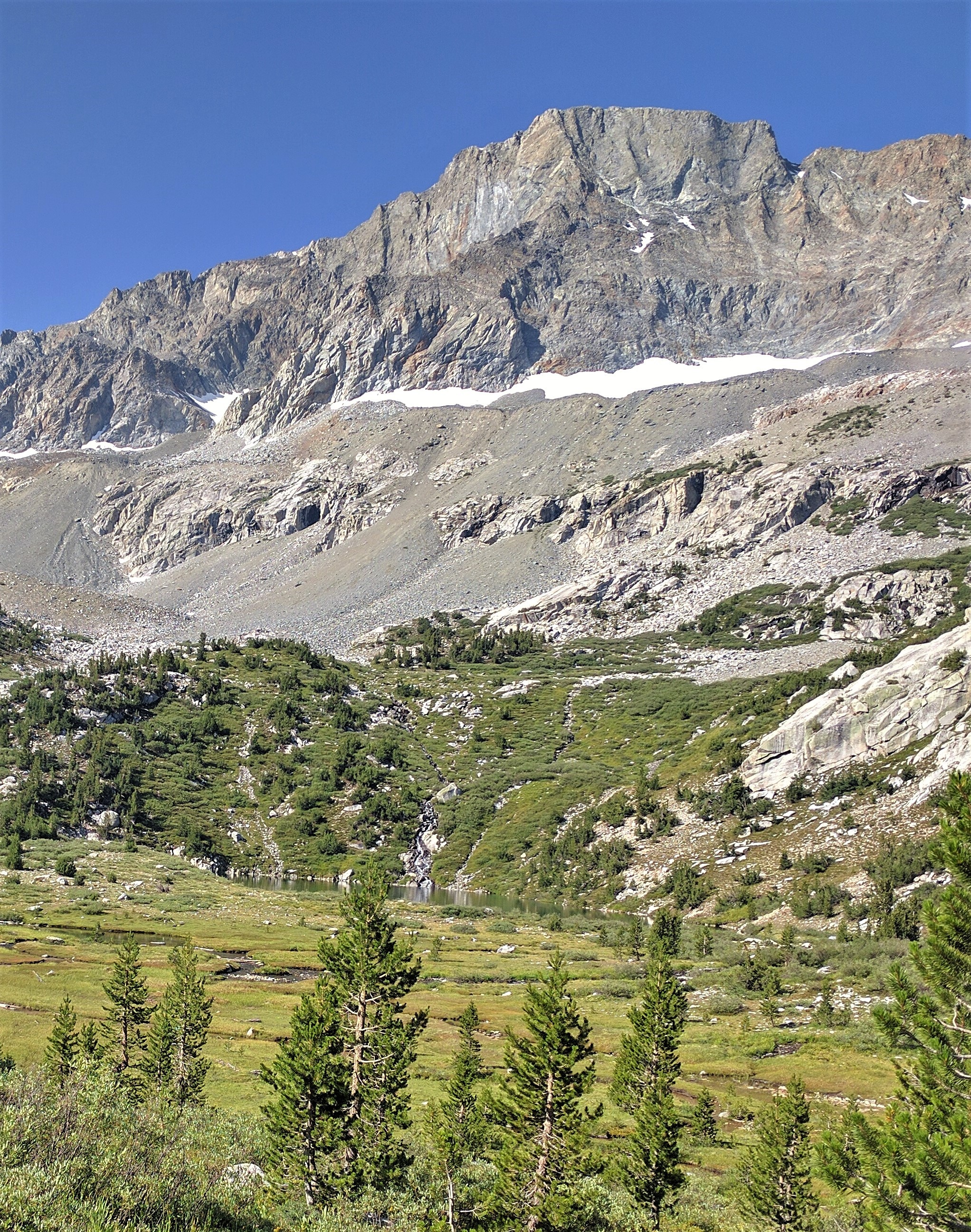
- East Face

Highest point
- Elevation: 13,330 ft (4,060 m)
- Prominence: 1,090 ft (330 m)
- Parent peak: Mount Fiske (13,503 ft)
- Isolation: 2.60 mi (4.18 km)
- Listing: Sierra Peaks Section
- Coordinates: 37°06′08″N 118°38′55″W

Geography
- Location within California Location within the United States
- Country: United States
- State: California
- County: Fresno
- Protected area: Kings Canyon National Park
- Parent range: Sierra Nevada
- Topo map: USGS Mount Goddard

Geology
- Rock type: metamorphic

Climbing
- First ascent: 1905, George R. Davis
- Easiest route: Western side class 1

Black Giant is a 13,330-foot-elevation (4,060-meter) mountain summit located west of the crest of the Sierra Nevada mountain range, in Fresno County of central California, United States. Black Giant ranks as the 86th highest summit in California. It is the northernmost and highest summit on its namesake ridge, the Black Divide in northern Kings Canyon National Park. The peak is situated 3.9 miles (6.3 km) east of Mount Goddard, and 2.6 miles (4.2 km) south-southeast of Mount Fiske, which is the nearest higher neighbor. Topographic relief is significant as it rises 4,000 feet (1,200 meters) above Le Conte Canyon in approximately two miles. Muir Pass is 1.4 miles (2.3 km) to the northwest, and the approach to this remote peak is made via the John Muir Trail.

== History ==
This mountain was bestowed its descriptive name in 1904 by Joseph Nisbet LeConte, a Sierra Nevada explorer and cartographer. LeConte wrote: "A few miles to the south rose a particularly inviting point, which certainly commands a peerless view. But time forbade an ascent this year, so I named it the Black Giant, and wondered how long it would stand as it has so far stood, an untrodden summit."

The first ascent of the summit was made in 1905 by George R. Davis, USGS topographic engineer.

In creating the map of the Mount Goddard quadrangle, 1907–1909, the USGS named this peak "Mount Goode", apparently unaware of LeConte's earlier naming. The Black Giant name was restored and officially adopted in 1926 by the United States Board on Geographic Names, and the Goode name was transferred to the present location of Mount Goode, five miles to the east-northeast of Black Giant.

== Climbing ==
Established climbing routes:

- West Slope – class 1 – First Ascent 1905
- South Slope – class 2
- Southeast Ridge – class 3 – FA 1971
- Northeast Face – class 4 – FA 1966 by Steve Roper

== Climate ==
According to the Köppen climate classification system, Black Giant is located in an alpine climate zone. Most weather fronts originate in the Pacific Ocean, and travel east toward the Sierra Nevada mountains. As fronts approach, they are forced upward by the peaks, causing them to drop their moisture in the form of rain or snowfall onto the range (orographic lift). This climate supports four small glaciers on the northeast aspect. Precipitation runoff from this mountain drains into tributaries of the Middle Fork Kings River.

== Gallery ==
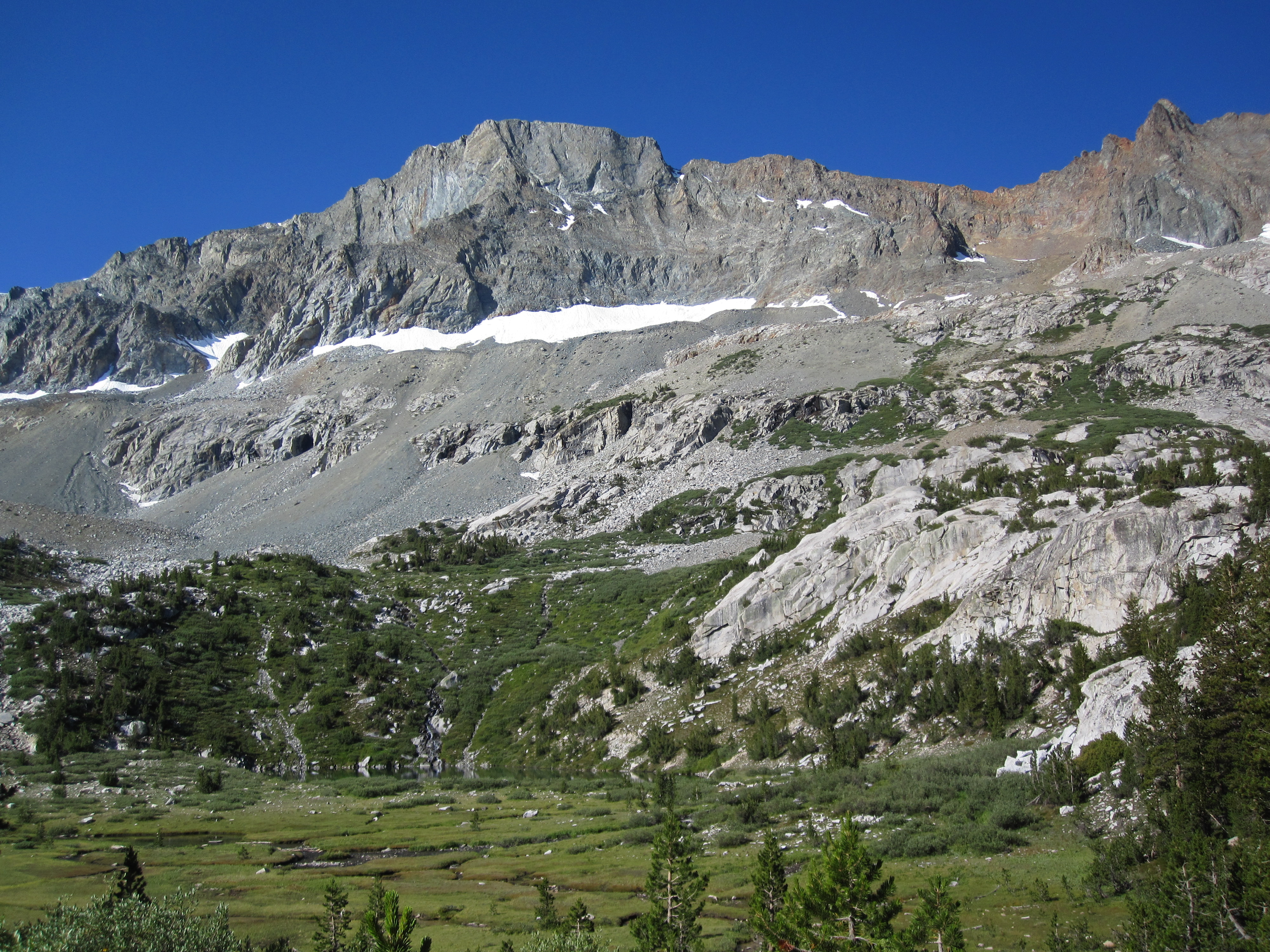
East aspect from Le Conte Canyon

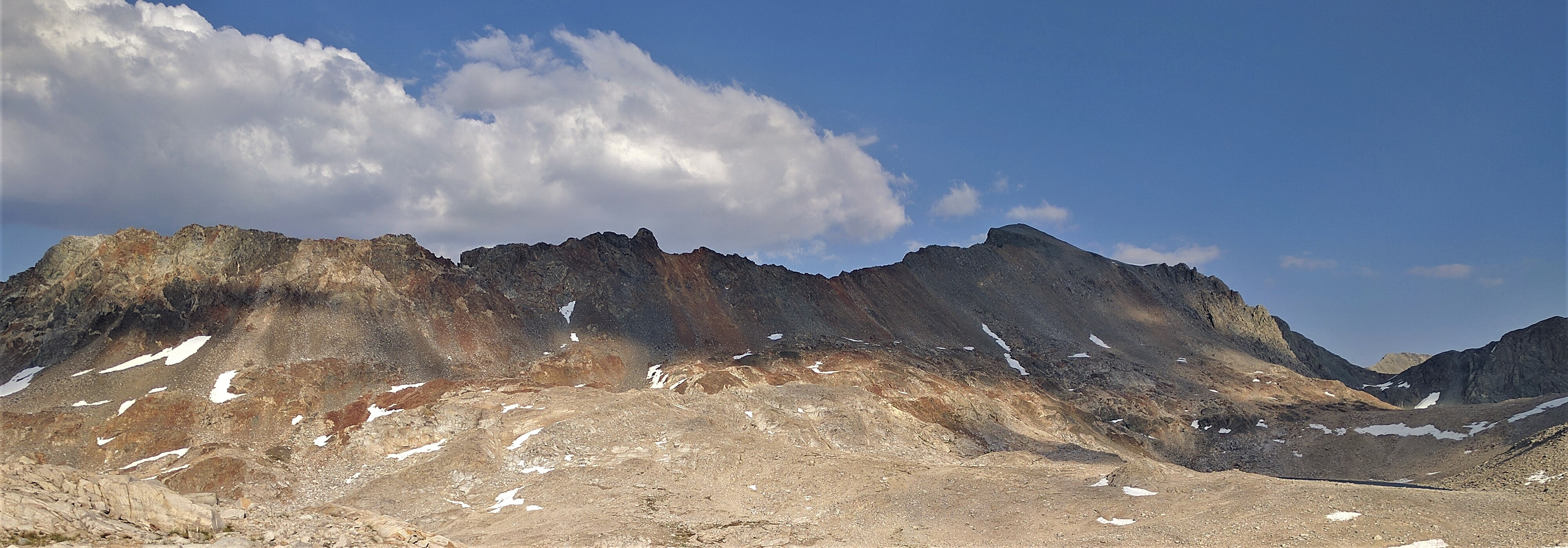
West aspect from Muir Pass

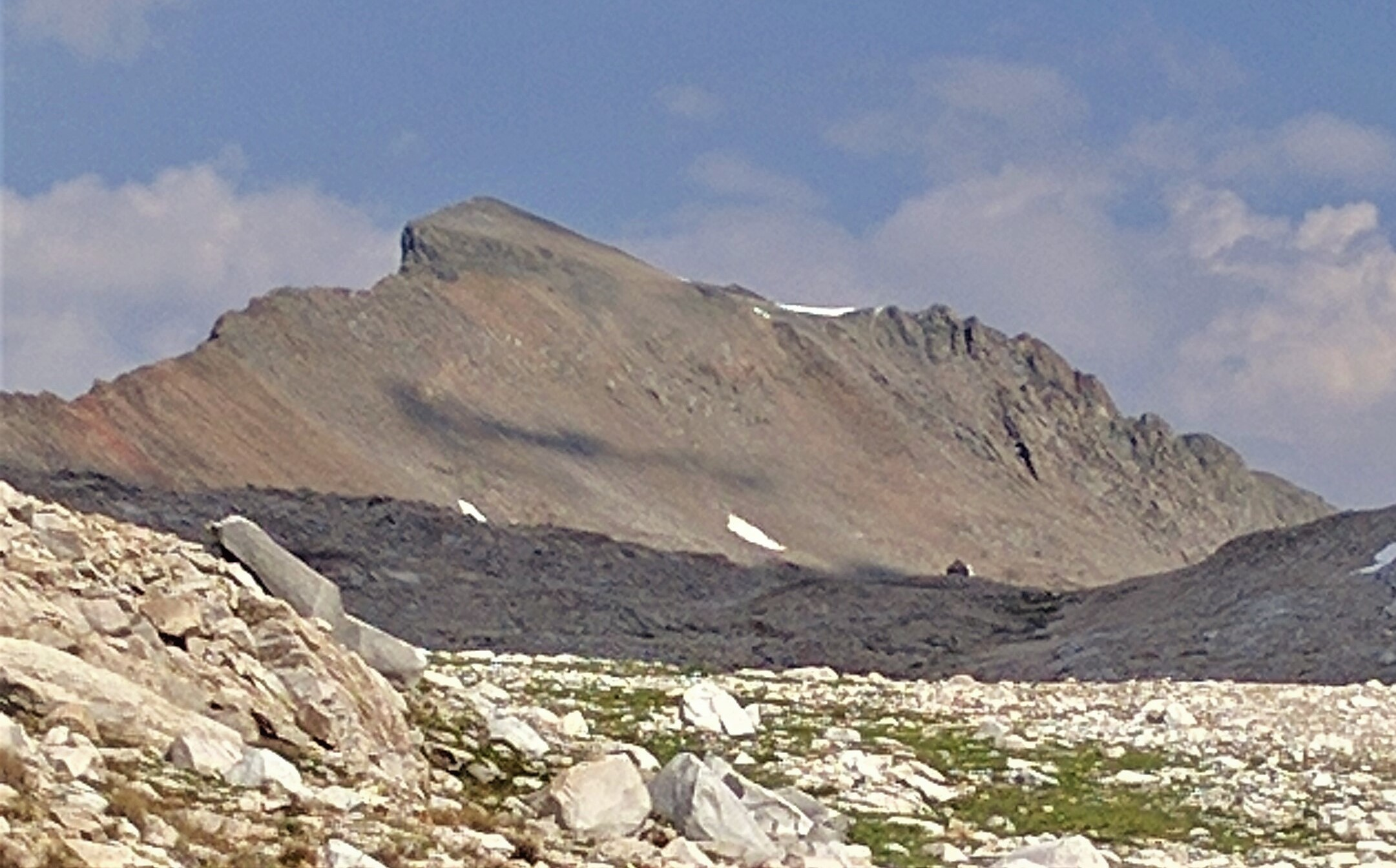
West aspect

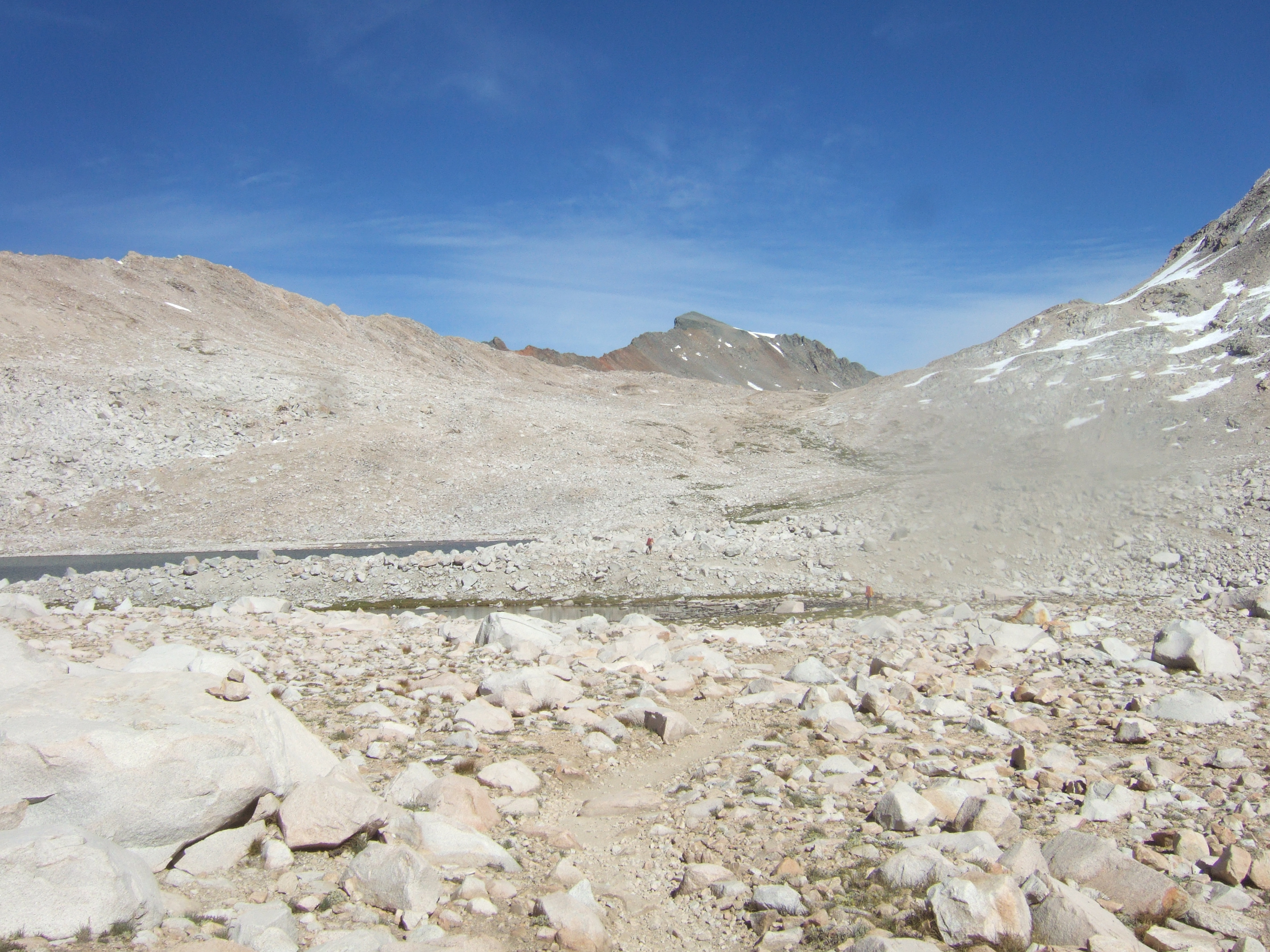
Black Giant beyond Muir Pass

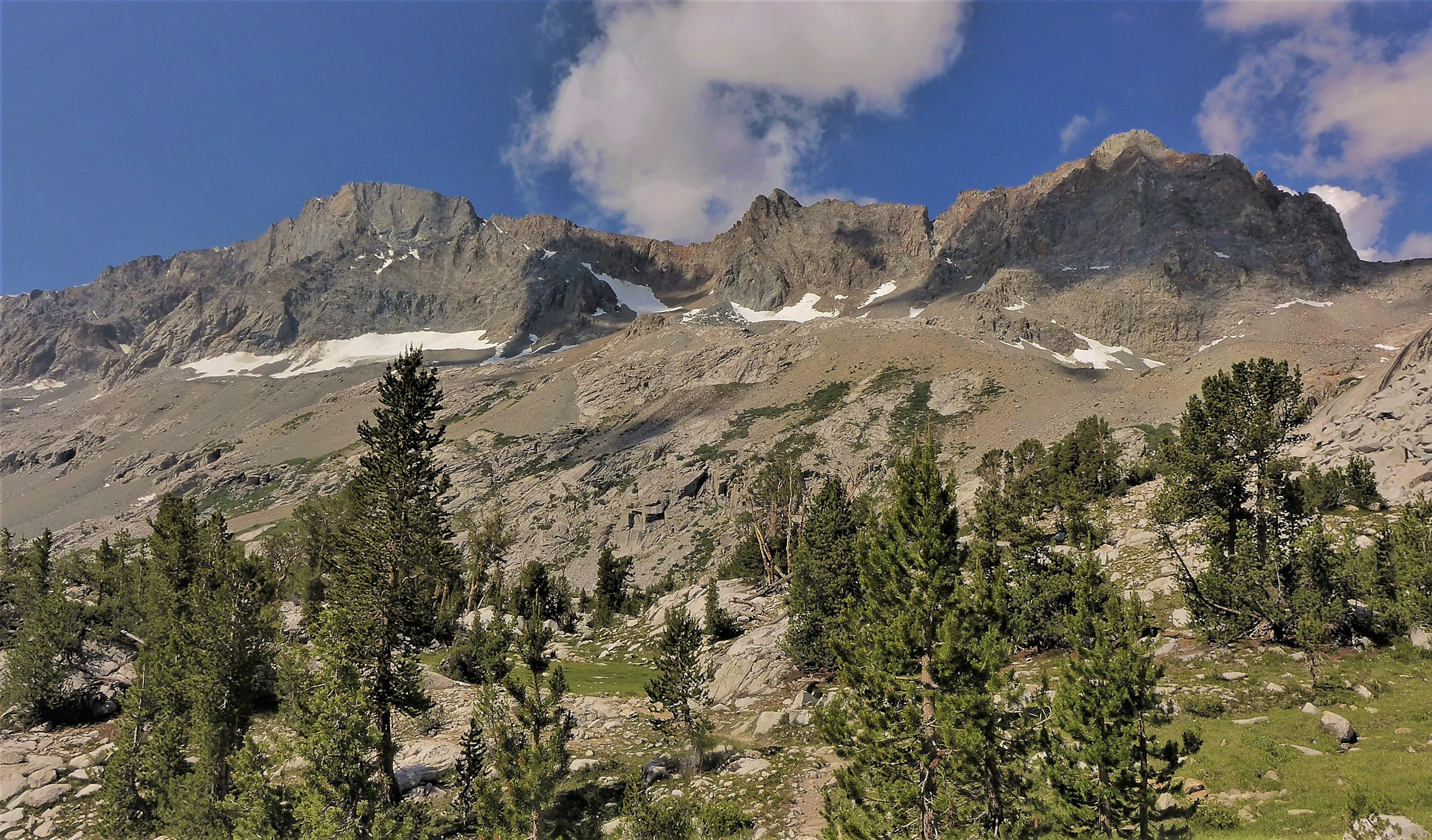
East aspect from LeConte Canyon

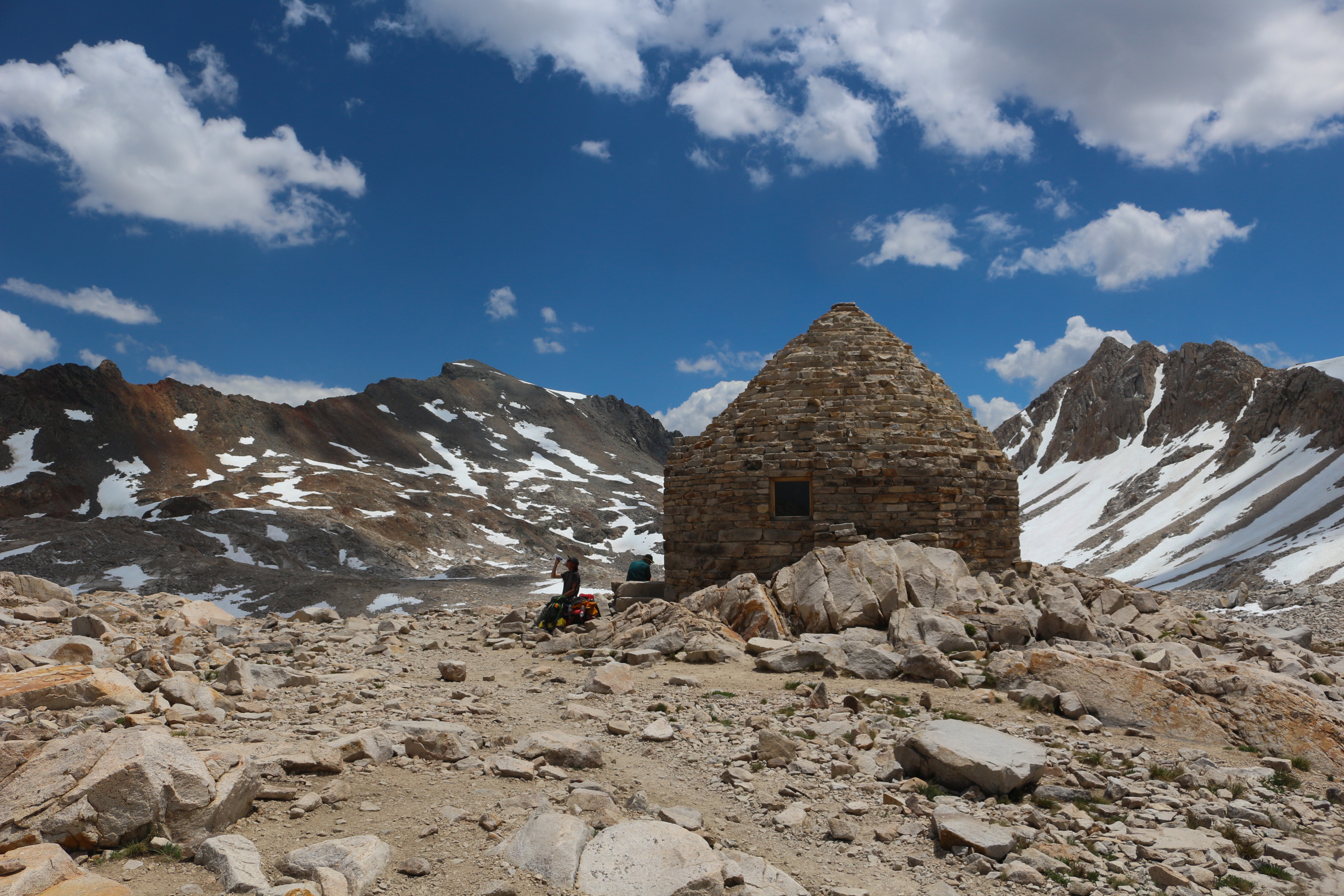
Black Giant behind (left) Muir Hut at Muir Pass

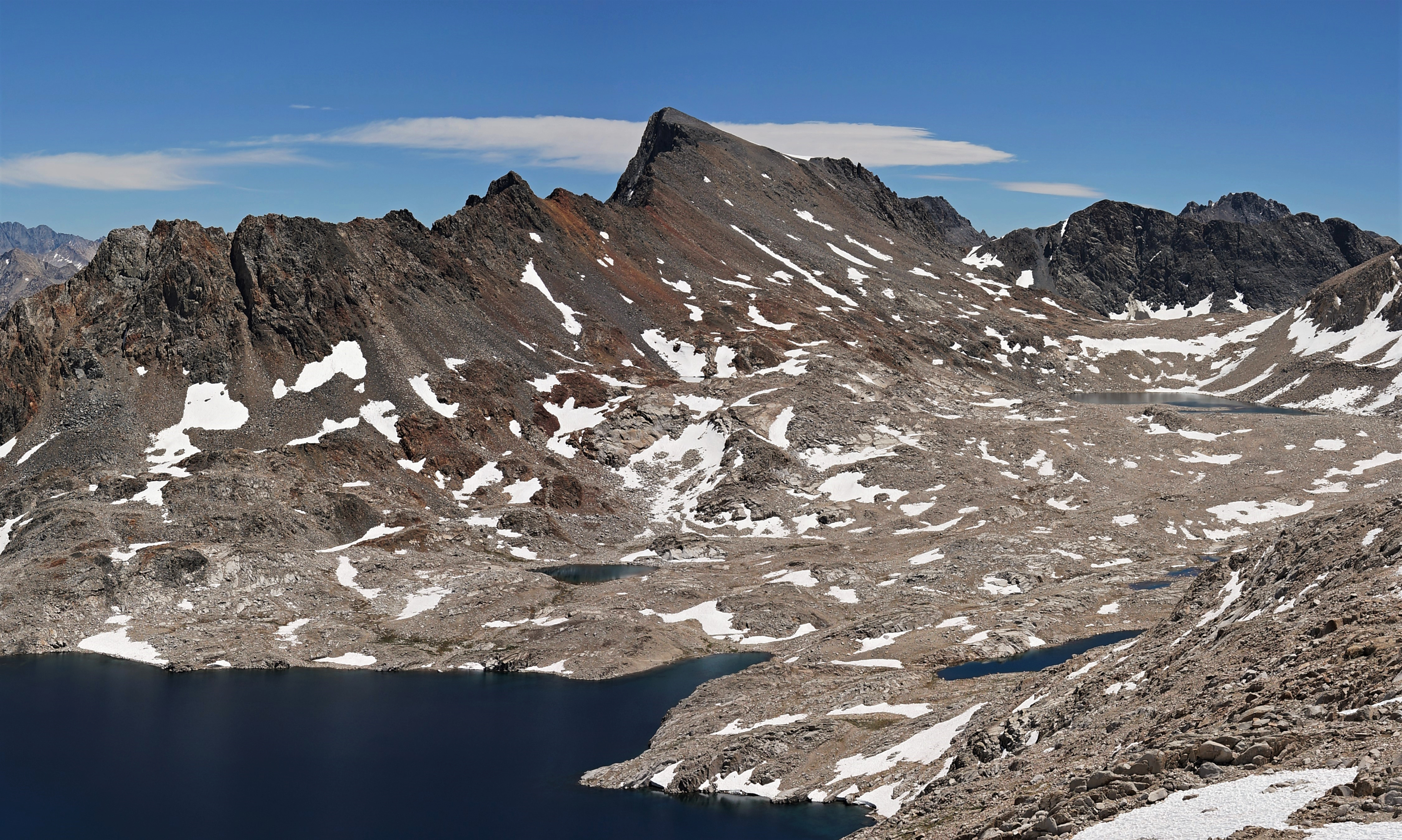

== See also ==
- List of the major 4000-meter summits of California
