= Middle Fork Kings River =

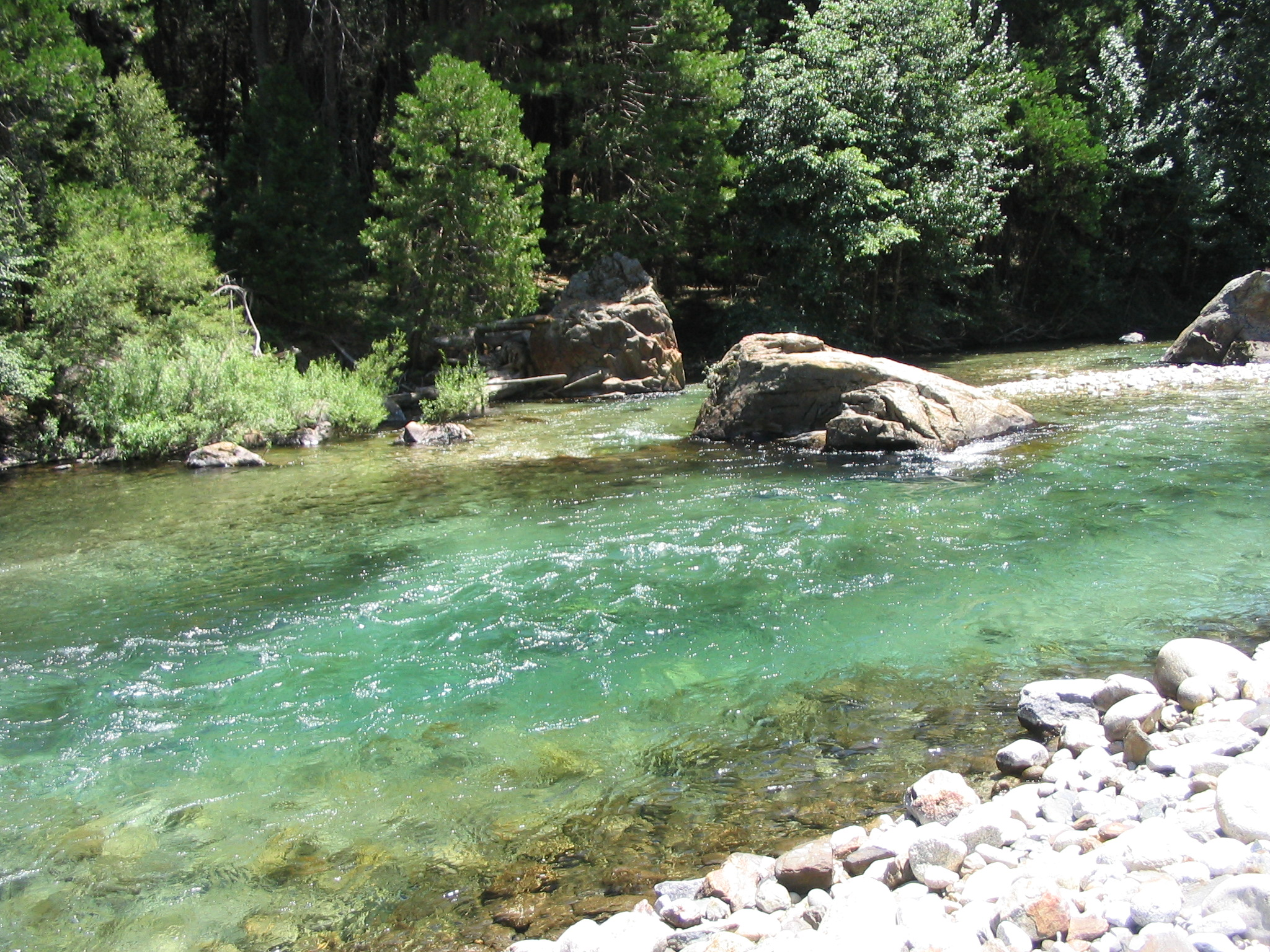
- Middle Fork at Tehipite Valley

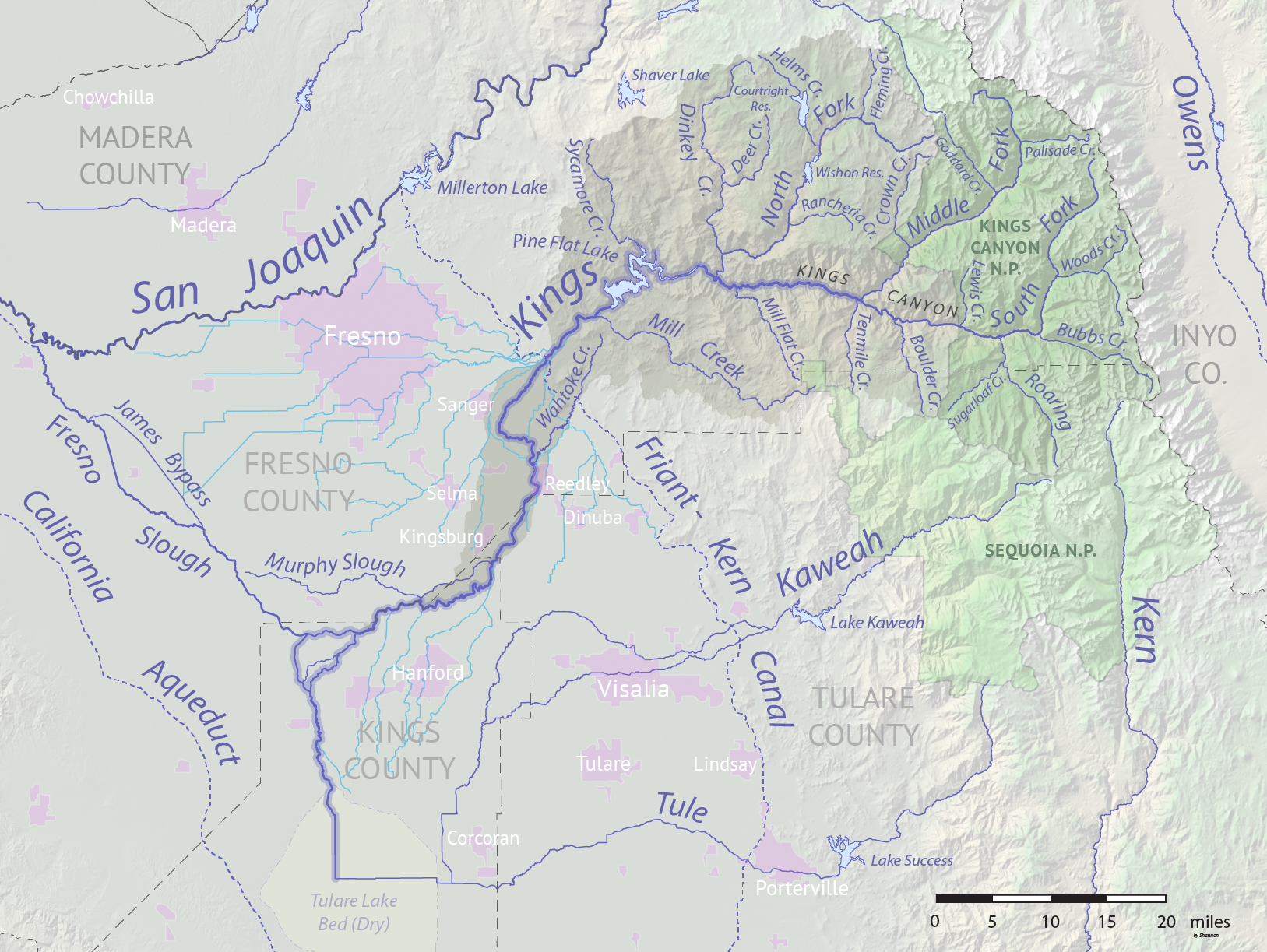
- Map of the Kings River watershed, including the Middle Fork

Location
- Country: United States
- State: California

Physical characteristics
- Source: Sierra Nevada
  - location: Kings Canyon National Park
  - coordinates: 37°06′17″N 118°39′45″W
  - elevation: 11,971 ft (3,649 m)
- Mouth: Kings River
  - location: Monarch Wilderness
  - coordinates: 36°50′18″N 118°52′30″W
  - elevation: 2,257 ft (688 m)
- Length: 37.2 mi (59.9 km)
- Basin size: 318 sq mi (820 km^{2})

Basin features
- Tributaries
  - right: Blue Canyon Creek, Crown Creek

National Wild and Scenic River
- Type: Wild
- Designated: November 3, 1987

The Middle Fork Kings River is a 37.2-mile (59.9 km) tributary of the Kings River in Kings Canyon National Park, California, in the southern Sierra Nevada. Draining 318 square miles (820 km^{2}) – almost all of it wilderness – the Middle Fork is one of the largest wholly undeveloped watersheds in the state, with no dams or paved roads within its basin. The entire length of the Middle Fork is designated a National Wild and Scenic River.

== Course ==
The Middle Fork originates at Helen Lake in the high Sierra, near Muir Pass in Kings Canyon National Park. From its headwaters at 11,971 feet (3,649 m) above sea level, it descends rapidly east down Le Conte Canyon, turning south at Big Pete Meadow. It passes the Le Conte Ranger Station and receives Dusy Creek from the east and then the much larger Palisade Creek, also from the east, a short distance downstream. Flowing south, it enters a narrower canyon where it drops over a waterfall known as Devil's Washbowl. It receives Cartridge Creek from the east, then turns southwest through Simpson Meadow, a broad subalpine valley at about 6,000-foot (1,800 m) elevation, where it receives Goddard Creek from the north.

Below Simpson Meadow the Middle Fork turns west-southwest, flowing along the bottom of the Slide Bluffs and receiving many small tributaries before reaching the dramatic glacial canyon of Tehipite Valley, one of the most isolated parts of the park. Tehipite Dome, rising 3,500 feet (1,100 m) above the river, is the largest granite dome in the Sierra. Many rattlesnakes inhabit the canyon, especially from Simpson Meadow down to the junction with the South Fork. Blue Canyon Creek and Crown Creek tumble down the north wall of the valley, forming waterfalls before they merge with the Middle Fork. Downstream, the Middle Fork flows through Little Tehipite Valley and then enters a rugged, trailless 8,000-foot (2,400 m) deep canyon in the Monarch Wilderness just outside the western boundary of the park. It joins with the South Fork Kings River to form the main stem of the Kings River, about 50 miles (80 km) upstream of Pine Flat Lake.

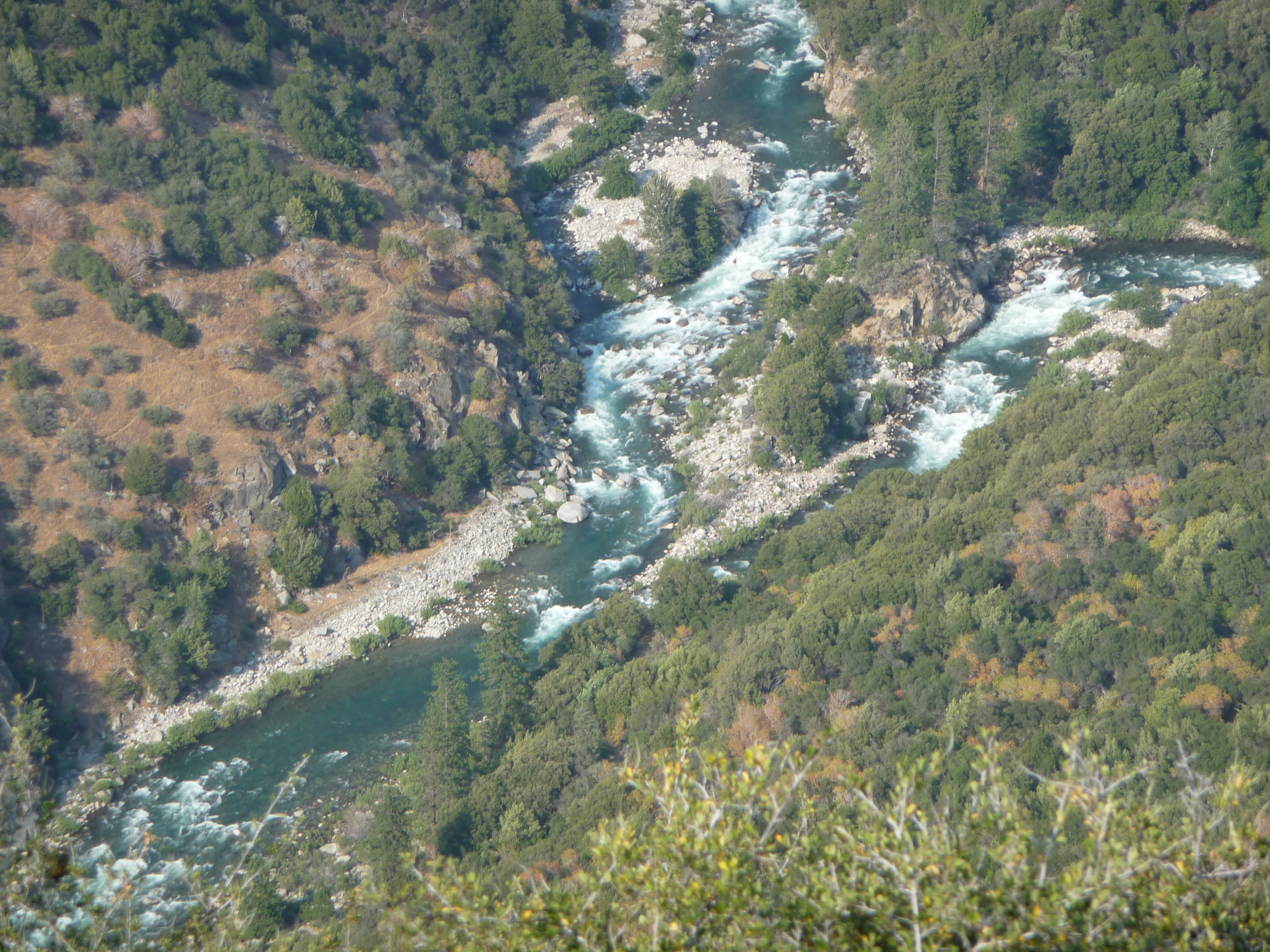
The mouth of the Middle Fork (above) where it joins the South Fork (right) to form the Kings River (lower left)

== See also ==
- North Fork Kings River
- South Fork Kings River
- List of rivers of California
