= Zimring =

Zimring is a surname. Notable people with this surname include:

- Carl A. Zimring, American environmental historian
- Franklin Zimring, American law professor
- Maurice Zimm (real name Maury Zimring), American film writer and Franklin Zimring's father
- Mike Zimring, American entertainment agent
- Valerie Zimring (born 1965), American Olympic gymnast
- Colton Zimring Gordon (born 1998), American baseball pitcher
