= Ingersoll Lectures on Human Immortality =

Harvard University endowed lecture (1896–2018, paused)

The Ingersoll Lectures is a series of lectures presented annually at Harvard University on the subject of immortality.

== Endowment ==
The Ingersoll Lectureship was established by a bequest by Caroline Haskell Ingersoll, who died in 1893, leaving $5000 for the institution of a series of lectures to be read annually in memory of her father, George Goldthwait Ingersoll. The lectures were to take place at Harvard University on the subject of "the immortality of man". The lectures were initiated by Harvard president Charles W. Eliot in 1896. They are now generally known as The Ingersoll Lectures on Human Immortality.

On May 21, 1979, the Ingersoll Lecture Fund was transferred to the endowment of Harvard Divinity School, which continues to organize and host the lectures.

The lectures were to be published. From 1896 to 1912 they were issued by the Houghton Mifflin Company of Boston and New York. From 1914 to 1935 Harvard University Press published them. Since then, the lectures have been published primarily in the Harvard Divinity Bulletin or the Harvard Theological Review.

== Lecturers and subjects (incomplete) ==
The chosen lecturers were as follows

- 1896: George A. Gordon — Immortality and the New Theodicy
- 1897: William James — Human Immortality: Two Supposed Objections to the Doctrine
- 1898: Benjamin Ide Wheeler — Dionysos and Immortality
- 1899: Josiah Royce — The Conception of Immortality
- 1900: John Fiske — Life Everlasting
- 1904: William Osler — Science and Immortality
- 1905: Samuel McChord Crothers — The Endless Life
- 1906: Charles Fletcher Dole — The Hope of Immortality: Our Reasons for it
- 1906B: Wilhelm Ostwald — Individuality and Immortality
- 1908: William Sturgis Bigelow — Buddhism and Immortality
- 1909: G. Lowes Dickinson — Is Immortality Desirable?
- 1911: George Andrew Reisner — The Egyptian Conception of Immortality
- 1914: George Foot Moore — Metempsychosis
- 1918: Clifford Herschel Moore — Pagan Ideas of Immortality during the Early Roman Empire
- 1920: Charles Reynolds Brown — Living Again
- 1921: William Wallace Fenn — Immortality and Theism
- 1922: Kirsopp Lake — Immortality and the Modern Mind
- 1923: George Edwin Horr — The Christian Faith and Eternal Life
- 1924: Philip Cabot — The Sense of Immortality
- 1925: Edgar S. Brightman — Immortality in Post-Kantian Idealism
- 1926: Gustav Kruger — The Immortality of Man According to the Views of the Men of the Enlightenment
- 1927: Harry Emerson Fosdick — Spiritual Values and Eternal Life
- 1928: Eugene William Lyman — The Meaning of Selfhood and Faith in Immortality
- 1929: W. Douglas Mackenzie — Man's Consciousness of Immortality
- 1930: Robert A. Falconer — The Idea of Immortality and Western Civilization
- 1931: Julius Seelye Bixler — Immortality and the Present Mood
- 1932: William Pepperell Montague — The Chances of Surviving Death
- 1933: Shailer Mathews — Immortality and the Cosmic Process
- 1934: Walter Eugene Clark — Indian Conceptions of Immortality
- 1935: C. H. Dodd — The Communion of Saints
- 1936: William Ernest Hocking — Meanings of Death
- 1937: George Lyman Kittredge — The Old Teutonic Idea of the Future Life
- 1938: Michael Ivanovich Rostovtzeff — The Mentality of the Hellenistic World and the Afterlife
- 1940: James Bissett Pratt — The Implications of Selfhood
- 1941: Alfred North Whitehead — Immortality
- 1942: Douglas V. Steere — Death's Illumination of Life
- 1943: Rufus M. Jones — The Spell of Immortality
- 1944: Louis Finkelstein — The Jewish Doctrine of Human Immortality
- 1945: Hu Shih — The Concept of Immortality in Chinese Thought
- 1946: John Haynes Holmes — The Affirmation of Immortality
- 1947: Howard Thurman — The Negro Spiritual Speaks of Life and Death
- 1948: Clyde K. M. Kluckhohn — Conceptions of Death Among Southwestern Indians
- 1949: Edwin Ewart Aubrey — Immortality and Purpose
- 1950: Charles Harold Dodd — Eternal Life
- 1951: Georges Florovsky — The Resurrection of Life
- 1952: Vilhjalmur Stefansson — The Mackenzie River Coronation Gulf Eskimos: Their Concept of the Spirit World and of Immortality
- 1953: Willard L. Sperry — Approaches to the Idea of Immortality
- 1954: Theodore Otto Wedel — The Community of Faith as the Agent of Salvation
- 1955: Oscar Cullmann — Immortality of the Soul and Resurrection of the Dead: The Witness of the New Testament
- 1956: Harry A. Wolfson — Immortality and Resurrection in the Philosophy of the Church Fathers
- 1957: Hans Hoffman — Immortality of Life
- 1958: Werner Jaeger — The Greek Ideas of Immortality
- 1959: Henry J. Cadbury — Intimations of Immortality in the Thought of Jesus
- 1960: John Knox — The Hope of Glory
- 1961: Hans Jonas — Immortality and the Modern Temper
- 1962: Paul Tillich — Symbols of Eternal Life
- 1963: Jaroslav Pelikan — Immortal Man and Mortal God
- 1964: Amos Niven Wilder — Mortality and Contemporary Literature
- 1965: Eric Voegelin — Immortality: Experience and Symbol
- 1966: Wilfred Cantwell Smith — Eternal Life
- 1967: Jürgen Moltmann — Resurrection as Hope
- 1968: Walter N. Pahnke — The Psychedelic Mystical Experience in the Human Encounter with Death
- 1970: Elisabeth Kübler-Ross — On Death and Dying
- 1971: Liston O. Mills — ?
- 1977: Jane I. Smith — Reflections on Aspects of Immortality in Islam
- 1981: Victor Turner — Images of Anti-Temporality: An Essay in the Anthropology of Experience
- 1983: Wolfhart Pannenberg — Constructive and Critical Functions of Christian Eschatology
- 1984: Martin E. Marty — Hell Disappeared. No One Noticed. A Civic Argument
- 1985: Robert J. Lifton — The Future of Immortality
- 1987: John B. Cobb Jr. — The Resurrection of the Soul
- 1988: Wilfred Cantwell Smith — Transcendence
- 1989: Caroline Walker Bynum — Bodily Miracles and the Resurrection of the Body in the High Middle Ages
- 1990: Stephen J. Gould — (title unavailable, but see for summary)
- 1991: Lawrence Sullivan — Death at Harvard and Death in America
- 1993: Marian Wright Edelman — Leave No Child Behind
- 1994: Jonathan Mann — Health, Society and Human Rights
- 1995: Steven Katz — The Shoah and Historical Memory
- 2000: Carol Zaleski — In Defense of Immortality
- 2001: Huston Smith — Intimations of Immortality: Three Case Studies
- 2002: Daniel Callahan — The Desire for Eternal Life: Scientific versus Religious Visions
- 2005: Karen Armstrong — Is Immortality Important? Religion is about Inhabiting the Eternal Here and Now
- 2006: James Hal Cone — Strange Fruit: The Cross and the Lynching Tree
- 2008: Leora Batnitzky — From Resurrection to Immortality: Theological and Political Implications in Modern Jewish Thought
- 2009: François Bovon — The Soul’s Comeback: Immortality and Resurrection in Early Christianity
- 2010: Albert Raboteau — Memory Eternal: The Presence of the Dead in Orthodox Christian Piety
- 2011: Robert R. Desjarlais – Cessation and Continuity: Poiesis in Life and Death among Nepal's Yolmo Buddhists.
- 2012: Toni Morrison — Goodness: Altruism and the Literary Imagination
- 2014: Russell Banks — Feeding Moloch: The Sacrifice of Children on the Altar of Capitalism
- 2017: Marilynne Robinson — Old Souls, New World
- 2018: Terry Tempest Williams — The Liturgy of Home
- 2019: The lectures were paused due to the COVID pandemic.
