= Institute for Legal Research =

Legal research center at the UC Berkeley School of Law

The Institute for Legal Research is a legal research center at the UC Berkeley School of Law. It was founded in 1967 as the Earl Warren Legal Institute, after American jurist and politician Earl Warren, and was originally an Organized Research Unit of the University of California, Berkeley. It was renamed to its current name in July 2005, and became part of the UC Berkeley School of Law in July 2009.

== Directors ==
- Richard M. Buxbaum (1969–1974)
- Lawrence Sullivan (1977–1982)
- Franklin Zimring (1983–2002)
- Harry N. Scheiber (2002–present)

== Other personnel ==
- Gordon Hawkins: senior fellow (1984–2001)
- Stephen Sugarman: director of Institute's Family Law Program (1988–1999)
