= Gordon Hawkins (criminologist) =

Australian criminologist

Gordon J. Hawkins
- Born: Gordon Joseph Hawkins; 1919 in London, England
- Occupations: Criminologist - Lecturer; Author - TV Host
- Spouse: Stephanie
- Death: 29 February 2004 in Manly, New South Wales, Australia

Gordon Joseph Hawkins (1919-2004) was an Australian criminologist and senior lecturer at Sydney University. Along with being a criminologist, he also acted, hosted a docuseries, and kept an opinion column in a newspaper.

== Early life and education ==
Gordon Hawkins was born in 1919 in London, England. Before his academic career, he served in World War II as a soldier.

During World War II, Gordon served as a captain for 7 years between 1939-1946 under the British command. He was stationed with the Indian Army in charge of the Gurkhas people from Southern Asia. After the war ended, Gordon returned home to Britain to continue his educational pursues.

Gordon Hawkins attended University of Wales and earned a degree in philosophy. He then went on to pursue his doctorate degree in philosophy at Oxford University. His thesis topic surrounded the debate of free will-determinism which is the study if behavior is pre-determined by prior actions or if humans control their behaviors. However, his doctorate degree was cut short due to financial restraints caused by the postwar economic rebuild.

== Family ==
He married his wife, Stephanie, while attending Oxford University. They lived in a farmhouse where they had their daughters. When they moved to Australia in 1961, they lived on the beach in Manly. Hawkins enjoyed swimming at his home as well as visited America several times during the winter time in Australia. He wrote many books in America having time away from lecturing.

== Career ==
Following his service in the war, Gordon joined the British Prison Service where he worked there for 10 years as an assistant governor. He mainly worked at the Maidstone and Wakefield prisons.

=== Senior lecturer ===
He served as a senior lecturer at Sydney University in their law school from 1961 to 1984, and was the Director of the Institute of Criminology at the university for 4 years. He came to teach at the university after the Dean of Faculty in the law program heard Hawkins speak at a conference in England regarding the prisons he governed over. After retiring in 1984, he served as a senior fellow at the University of California, Berkeley's Earl Warren Legal Institute until 2001.

=== Author ===
From 1970 to 1999, he published twelve books, nine of them co-authored with Berkeley professor Franklin Zimring. His first book, The Honest Politician's Guide to Crime Control, was co-authored by Norval Morris and published by the University of Chicago Press in 1970. The book centers on the ideas of research-based evidence guiding criminal justice policies rather than the public reactions or political pressures. These ideals were involved with social reforms such as liberalism and tolerance; however, they were not introduced into legislation and policy until the 1990s.

Hawkins book, The Prison: Policy and Practice (1976), referenced a real-life event that occurred in a prison system in New South Wales during 1970. The book goes against the idea that prison systems fail due to not being harsh enough. The punitive strategies do not fix the issues and create an unstable and dangerous environment. Hawkins explains that history and present day events show these punitive ideals do not match the evidence. More riots and unrest as well as deaths and injuries occur for both staff and inmates. Later, Hawkins released Imprisonment in America: Choosing the future (1981), co-authored with Michael Sherman. They continued building on the focus from The Prison: Policy and Practice, concentrating on how prison systems work and what penal institutions should be like in the future. Hawkins relates these notions to the riots that occurred in 1970 in New South Wales, Australia and again in 1974 at Bathurst in Australia where prisoners burned down a big portion of the institution. Hawkins was influential with promoting the ideal that riots were the outcome of maladministration practices not the lack of punitive policies. His writings and lectures indirectly influenced various reform advocates and the government to review the New South Wales prison system and implement recommendations for improving the system management procedures.

=== Media work ===
Gordon Hawkins starred in a daytime series known as 'People in Conflict' while still being involved in his academic work. He also wrote and hosted a documentary series called 'Beyond Reasonable Doubt' that was aired on ABC television. In this series, Gordon would examine verdicts in criminal cases that raised doubt. Eventually, Gordon adapted the series into a book titled Beyond Reasonable Doubt. The book analyzes four notable Australian criminal trials and focuses on the limitations of the criminal justice system. One case involved Leith Ratten with the concern of controversial circumstantial evidence being present for his conviction. Another case focuses on forensic evidence disputes with Alexander McLeod-Lindsay being convicted of murdering a NSW detective sergeant. Hawkins shades light on the errors legal professionals and jurors make as well as questions if circumstantial evidence can be relied upon when establishing reasonable guilt.

Apart from his involvement in television, Gordon would write his opinions and observations from current events in a newspaper column throughout the 1960's and 1970's.

== Death ==
Gordon Hawkins died on 29 February 2004 due to a heart condition. He passed away in Manly Hospital in Sydney, Australia.

== Books ==
- Hawkins, G. (1976). The Prison: Policy and Practice. University of Chicago Press.
- Hawkins, G. (1977). Beyond reasonable doubt. Australian Broadcasting Commission.
- Morris, N., & Hawkins, G. (1970). The honest politician’s guide to criminal control. University of Chicago Press.
- Sherman, M. E., & Hawkins, G. (1981). Imprisonment in America: Choosing the future. University of Chicago Press.
- Zimring, F. E., & Hawkins, G. (1973). Deterrence: The legal threat in crime control. University of Chicago Press.
- Zimring, F. E., & Hawkins, G. (1987a). Capital punishment and the American agenda. University of Chicago Press.
- Zimring, F. E., & Hawkins, G. (1987b). Pornography in a free society. Cambridge University Press.
- Zimring, F. E., & Hawkins, G. (1991). The scale of imprisonment. University of Chicago Press.
- Zimring, F. E., & Hawkins, G. (1992a). The search for rational drug control. Cambridge University Press.
- Zimring, F. E., & Hawkins, G. (1992b). Prison population and criminal justice policy in California. Institute of Governmental Studies Press, University of California.
- Zimring, F. E., & Hawkins, G. (1995). Incapacitation: Penal confinement and the restraint of crime. Oxford University Press.
- Zimring, F. E., & Hawkins, G. (1997). Crime is not the problem: Lethal violence in America. Oxford University Press.
- Zimring, F. E., Hawkins, G., & Kamin, S. (2001). Punishment and democracy: Three strikes and you're out in California. Oxford University Press.
