= Mike Zimring =

Michael Zimring
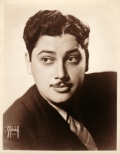
- Early photo of Mike Zimring
- Born: May 14, 1916; Iowa
- Died: February 23, 2011 (aged 94); Los Angeles, California
- Occupation: Entertainment agent
- Spouse: Connie Russell
- Children: 2
- Relatives: Maurice Zimm (brother) Franklin Zimring (nephew)

Mike Zimring (May 24, 1916 – February 23, 2011) was an American entertainment agent.

Born to a Jewish family, Zimring attended the drama school, Pasadena Playhouse, from 1936 to 1937 and was a radio actor in Hollywood and Chicago from 1938 to 1941. He was a captain in the United States Army from 1941 to 1946, heading the theatrical branch of the European Theater of Operations. In 1947, he was assistant to Orson Welles in the Mercury Theater. Zimring joined the William Morris Agency in 1948, becoming the senior agent in the motion picture department in 1950 and head of the literary department in 1959. He stayed at the William Morris Agency for several decades before becoming independent in the early 1990s. He lived in Beverly Hills, California.

His clients over the years included Karl Malden, Carl Reiner, Katharine Hepburn, Gore Vidal, Herbert Lom, Frank Capra, Jean Renoir, and his wife Connie Russell. In his memoirs, Carl Reiner called Mike Zimring "the most civilized of all Hollywood agents."

Zimring's older brother Maury (a.k.a. Maurice Zimm) wrote the story for Creature from the Black Lagoon.

Zimring died February 23, 2011, at Midway Hospital in Los Angeles.
