= Harry N. Scheiber =

American jurist and legal scholar (born 1935)

- Born: 1935 (age 90–91); New York City, U.S.
- Awards: Rockefeller Foundation Fellowship (1979)

Academic background
- Education: Columbia College, Columbia University (A.B., 1955), Cornell University (M.A., 1957; Ph.D., 1962)
- Thesis: Internal improvements and economic change in Ohio, 1820-1860 (1962)

Academic work
- Discipline: Legal scholar, historian
- Sub-discipline: American legal history, law of the sea, federalism in the United States
- Institutions: Dartmouth College, University of California, San Diego, Boalt Hall School of Law

Harry N. Scheiber (born 1935 in New York, New York) is an American jurist and legal scholar. He is the Stefan Riesenfeld Professor of Law and History at the University of California, Berkeley School of Law where he is also the director of the Institute for Legal Research. In the latter role, he also directs the Boalt Hall School of Law's Sho Sato Program in Japanese and U.S. Law, and co-directs its Law of the Sea Institute. His work has covered multiple different legal subjects, such as the history of American law, federalism, and environmental law.

== Career ==
Scheiber became an instructor at Dartmouth College in 1960, where he later became a full professor before leaving the faculty in 1971. He then became a professor of American history at UC San Diego, where he taught until joining the faculty of UC Berkeley in 1980. He was named the Stefan Riesenfeld Professor of Law and History there in 1991, and became the director of the Institute for Legal Research (then known as the Earl Warren Legal Institute) in 2002. He was the president of the American Society for Legal History from 2003 to 2005.

== Honors and awards ==
Scheiber received a humanities fellowship from the Rockefeller Foundation in 1979. He was named an honorary life fellow of the American Society for Legal History in 1999, and a fellow of the American Academy of Arts and Sciences in 2004.
