= Beyond Reasonable Doubt (TV series) =

Australian documentary series (1977)

Beyond Reasonable Doubt is an Australian documentary series broadcast by the ABC in 1977. Presented by criminologist professor Gordon Hawkins, it had 4 episodes revisiting four different criminal cases. The cases involving Ronald Ryan, Alexander McLeod-Lindsay Leith Ratten, and Frits Van Beelen had their evidence re-examined and it was questioned whether the cases were proven beyond reasonable doubt. It was created by Geoff Daniels and produced by ABC's feature group.

== Episodes ==
Episode 1: The Ronald Ryan Case

Bill Hunter as Ronald Ryan, Hugh Keays-Byrne as Patterson, Rod Mullinar as Prosecutor, John Gaden as Defence, Jay Bland as Walker, Ralph Cotterill as Prison officer Lange

Episode 2: The McLeod-Lindsay Case

Graham Corry as Alexander McLeod-Lindsay, Gillian Jones as Pamela McLeod-Lindsay

Episode 3: The Leith Ratten Case

Danny Adcock as Leith Ratten, Julie Dawson as Mrs. K

Episode 4: The Van Beelen Case

William L. Nagle as Frits Van Beelen, David Bracks, Graham Rouse
