= Mount Fiske =

Mountain in California, United States

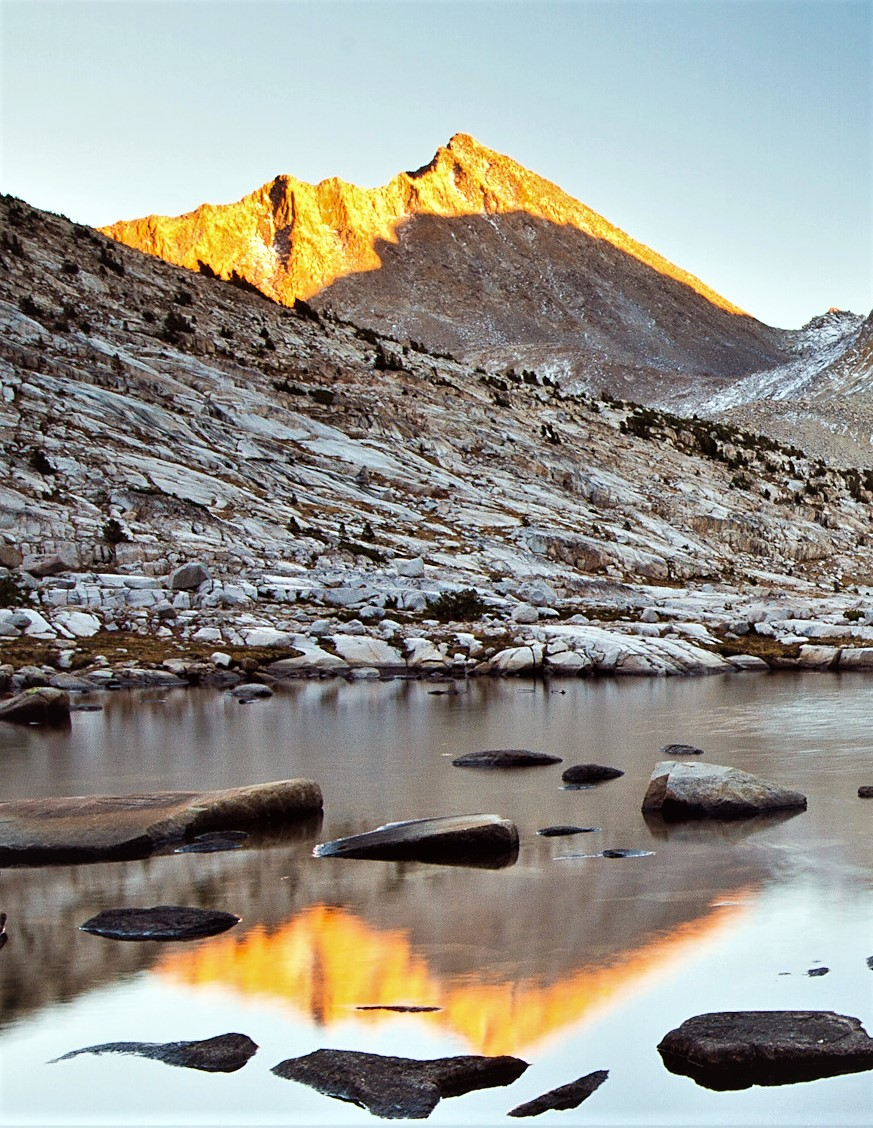
- Northwest aspect, from Sapphire Lake

Highest point
- Elevation: 13,503 ft (4,116 m)
- Prominence: 823 ft (251 m)
- Parent peak: Mount Darwin (13,837 ft)
- Isolation: 2.12 mi (3.41 km)
- Listing: Sierra Peaks Section
- Coordinates: 37°08′12″N 118°40′04″W

Naming
- Etymology: John Fiske

Geography
- Location within California Location within the United States
- Location: Kings Canyon National Park; Fresno County; California, U.S.
- Parent range: Sierra Nevada
- Topo map: USGS Mount Darwin

Geology
- Rock type: granite

Climbing
- First ascent: 1922
- Easiest route: class 2 Southeast Ridge

Mount Fiske is a 13,503-foot elevation (4,116 m) mountain summit located near the crest of the Sierra Nevada mountain range, in Fresno County of northern California, United States. It is situated in northern Kings Canyon National Park, 23 miles (37 km) west of the community of Big Pine, 0.83 miles (1.34 km) east of Mount Huxley, and two miles south of Mount Darwin, which is the nearest higher neighbor. Mount Fiske ranks as the 60th highest summit in California.

== Climate ==
According to the Köppen climate classification system, Mount Fiske is located in an alpine climate zone. Most weather fronts originate in the Pacific Ocean, and travel east toward the Sierra Nevada mountains. As fronts approach, they are forced upward by the peaks, causing them to drop their moisture in the form of rain or snowfall onto the range (orographic lift). This climate supports the Mount Fiske Glacier in the north cirque. Precipitation runoff from this mountain drains southeast into headwaters of the Middle Fork Kings River, or northwest into Evolution Creek which is a San Joaquin River tributary.

== History ==
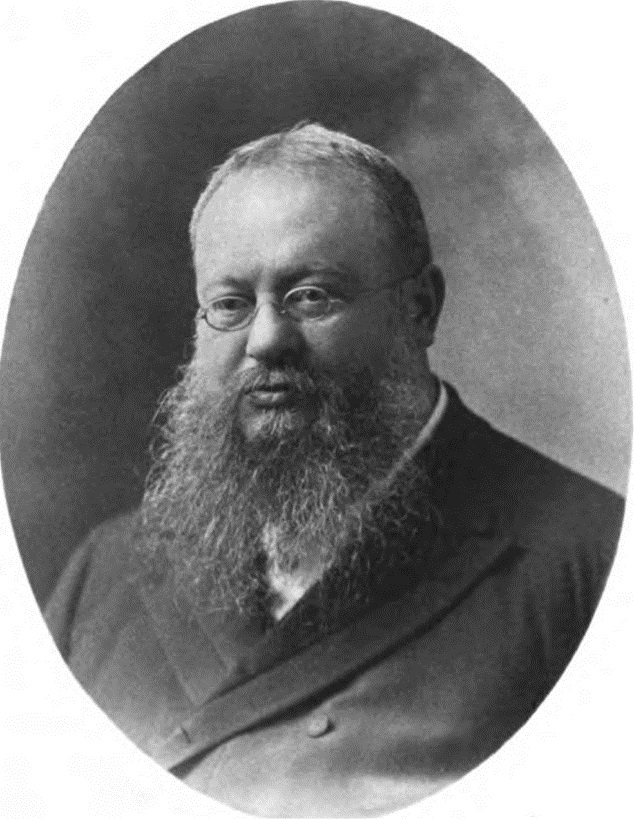
John Fiske

In 1895, Sierra Club explorer Theodore S. Solomons named a group of mountains in the Sierra Nevada after exponents of Darwin's theory of evolution. These six peaks are now known collectively as the Evolution Group. This mountain's name commemorates John Fiske (1842–1901), an American philosopher and historian. The other five peaks were named after Charles Darwin, Ernst Haeckel, Alfred Russel Wallace, Herbert Spencer, and Thomas Henry Huxley.

The first ascent of the summit was made August 10, 1922, by Sierra Club member Charles Norman Fiske, his sons John Norman Fiske and Stephen Burlingame Fiske, and Sierra Club member Frederick Kellett via the southeast ridge. The first ascent via the class 2 Southwest Ridge was made on August 18, 1939, by Jack Sturgeon, also of the Sierra Club.

== Gallery ==
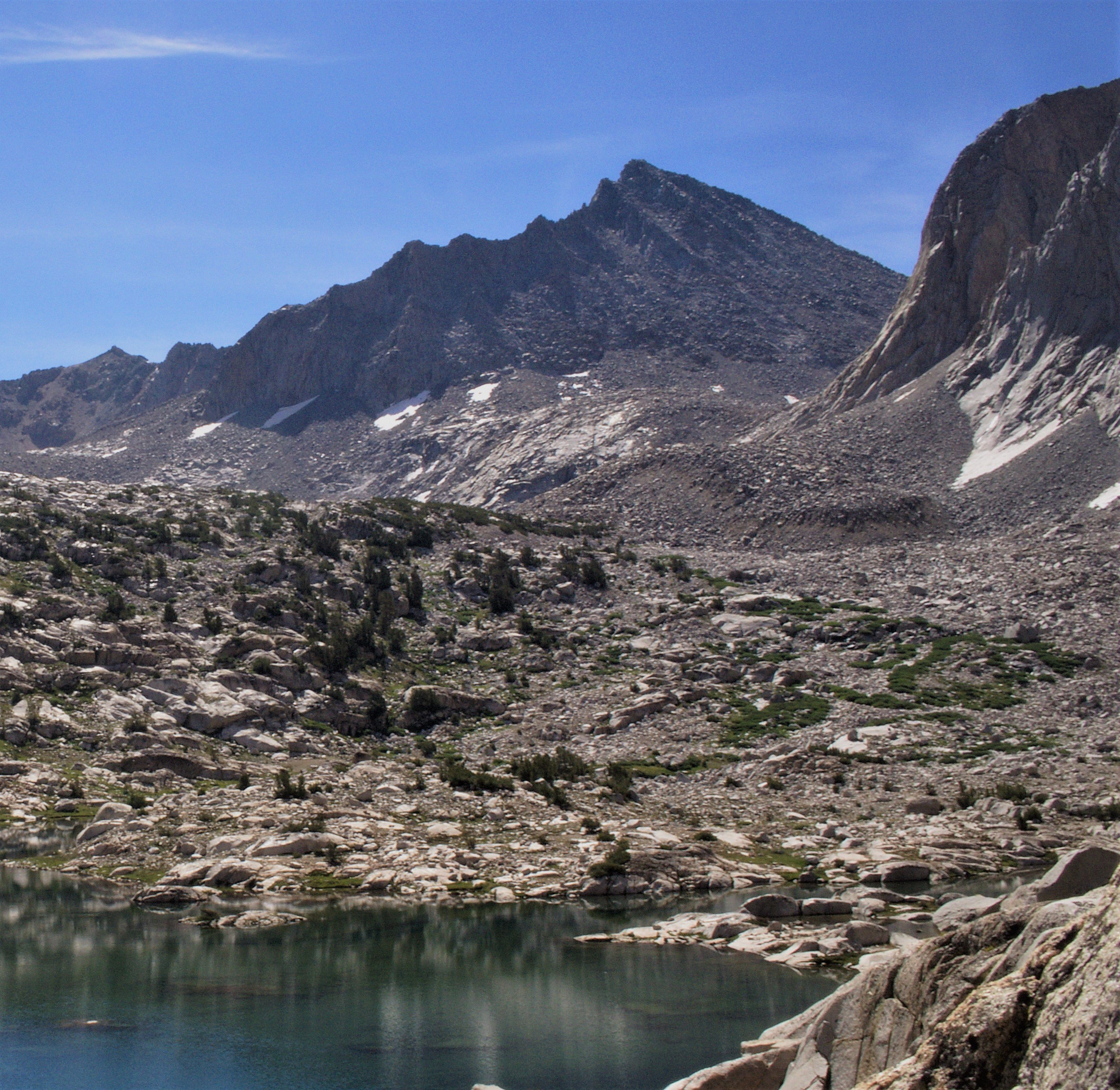
Mt. Fiske

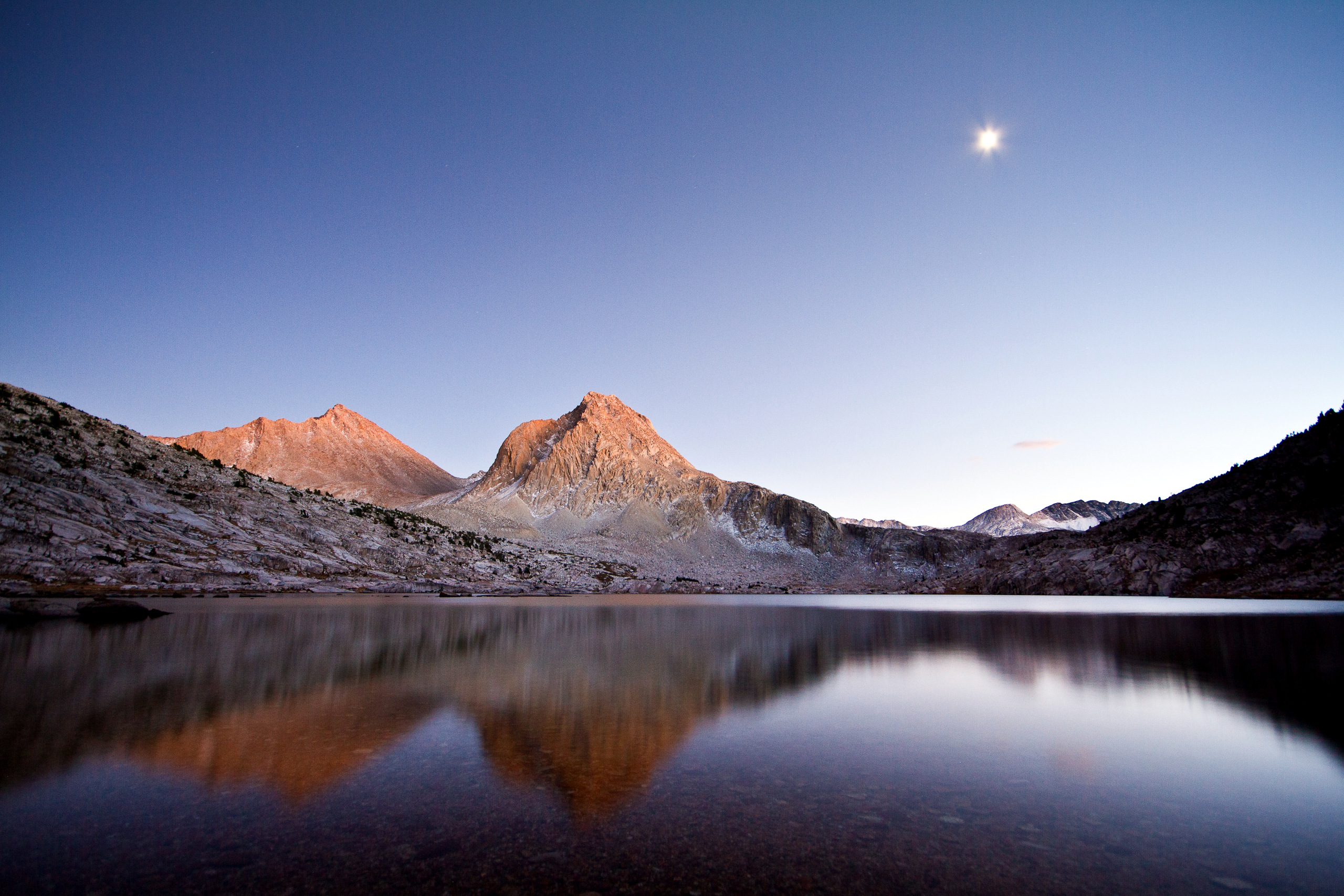
Mts. Fiske (left) and Huxley (center) seen from Sapphire Lake

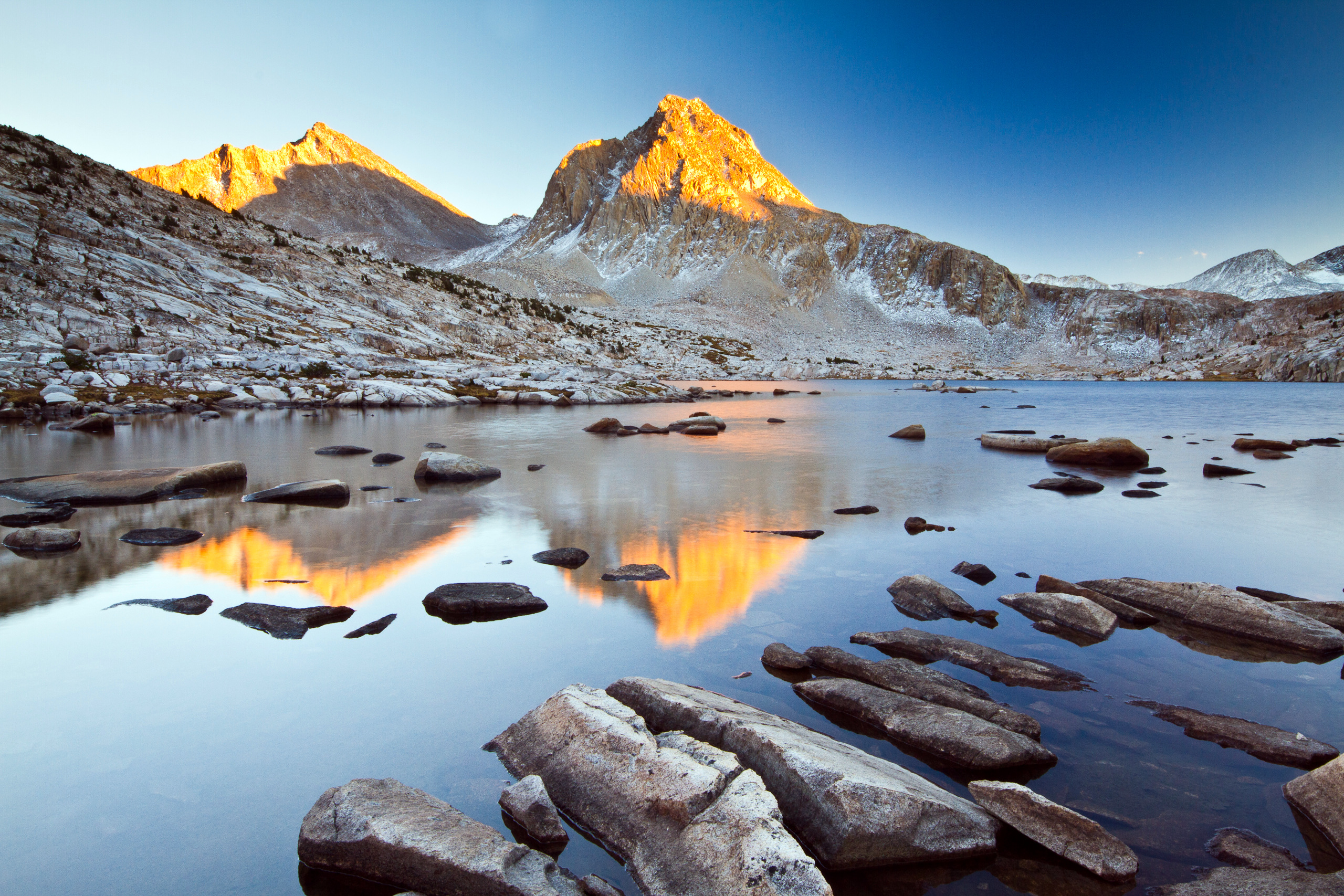
Mt. Fiske (left) and Mt. Huxley (center) reflected in Sapphire Lake at sunset

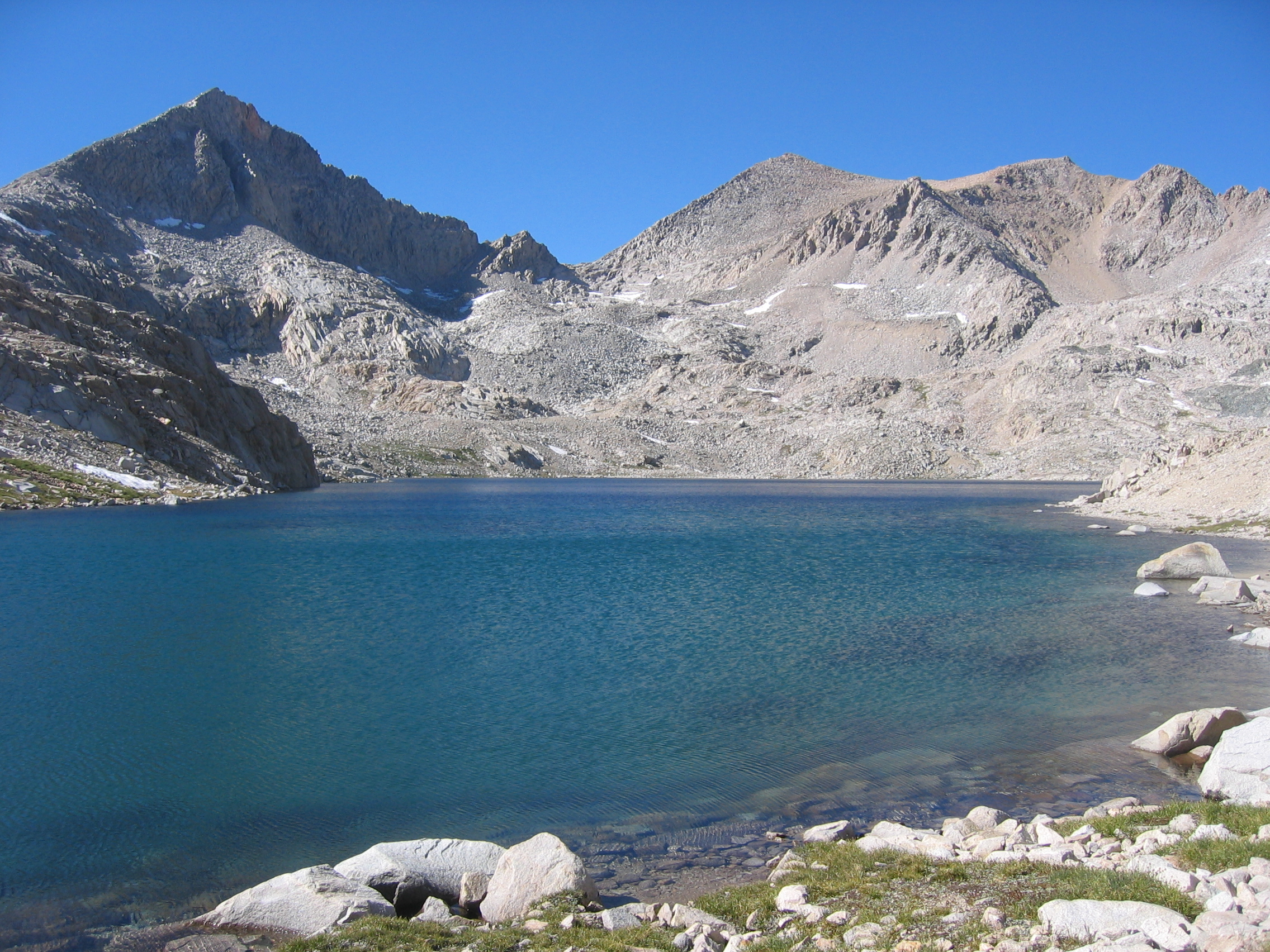
Mount Warlow (left) and Fiske (right) seen from Helen Lake

== See also ==
- List of the major 4000-meter summits of California
- Mount Haeckel
- Mount Wallace
