= Mount Warlow Glacier =

Glacier in California, United States

- Location within California
- Type: Mountain glacier
- Location: Kings Canyon National Park, Fresno County, California, United States
- Coordinates: 37°07′51″N 118°40′38″W
- Length: .10 mi (0.16 km)
- Terminus: Talus
- Status: Retreating

Mount Warlow Glacier is a small glacier located in the Sierra Nevada Range within Kings Canyon National Park in the U.S. state of California. The glacier is on the northwest slope of Mount Warlow (13,206 ft (4,025 m)) and is .70 mi (1.13 km) southwest of Mount Fiske Glacier.

== See also ==
- List of glaciers in the United States
