= John Young (jurist) =

Australian jurist (1919–2008)

Sir John McIntosh Young AC, KCMG, KStJ (17 December 1919 – 6 October 2008) was an Australian jurist. He was the Chief Justice of the Supreme Court of Victoria (1974–91), the Lieutenant-Governor of Victoria (1974–95), and the Chief Scout of Australia (1989–96).

John Young was born in Melbourne to Scottish immigrant parents, George David Young shipping agent and his wife Kathleen Mildred. He went to Geelong Grammar School, and then to Oxford. On the day after the Second World War broke out in September 1939 he joined the Horse Cavalry, then after officer training at Royal Military College, Sandhurst he asked to be transferred to the Scots Guards (1940-1946). He was mentioned in despatches after heavy fighting in Germany. He was the officer in charge of Rudolf Hess's guards when Hess tried to escape in 1941 at Camp Z in Surrey.

On return to Australia, he did a law degree at the University of Melbourne, and was admitted to the Victorian Bar in 1948. He was chairman of the Victorian Police Board, president of the Victorian Law Foundation, and president of the Victorian Bar. He became Chief Justice of Victoria in 1974, and was also appointed Lieutenant-Governor of Victoria that year. As Chief Justice, he was not afraid to speak out against the government of the day.

He had a long association with the Scouting movement, and he accepted the role of Chief Scout of Australia in 1989, when the newly appointed Governor-General Bill Hayden declined it on the grounds that the Scout Oath was incompatible with his atheism. In 1996–97 he was National President of Scouts Australia.

In 1951 he married Elisabeth Barbara Twining (1919-2006), daughter of Dr. Edward Wing Twining MRCP, FFR. and his wife Mildred (Molly) née Boswell.

Sir John Young died on 6 October 2008, survived by two daughters and a son, and their families. He was given a state funeral at St Paul's Cathedral, Melbourne on 16 October.

== Honours ==
1974: Knight Commander of the Order of St Michael and St George (KCMG)

1978: Knight of the Most Venerable Order of Hospital of Saint John of Jerusalem (KStJ)

1989: Companion of the Order of Australia (AC) for his services to the law and the Crown.

Legal offices
Preceded by Sir Henry Winneke	Chief Justice of the Supreme Court of Victoria; 1974–1991	Succeeded by John Harber Phillips
Government offices
Preceded by Sir Henry Winneke	Lieutenant-Governor of Victoria; 1974–1995	Succeeded by Sir James Gobbo
