= Leith Ratten =

Australian murderer

- Born: 18 January 1939; Australia
- Died: 20 January 2012 (aged 73); Brisbane, Queensland
- Occupation: Surveyor
- Status: Deceased
- Conviction: Murder
- Penalty: Death; commuted to 25 years imprisonment

Leith McDonald Ratten (18 January 1939 – 20 January 2012) was a convicted murderer from Echuca, Australia whose case ignited controversy and national interest in the 1970s. Leading lawyers were convinced of his innocence. He died in January 2012.

== Background ==
On May 7, 1970, members of the Victoria Police stationed in Echuca responded to an emergency call at a home in Mitchell Street. They found a heavily-pregnant woman, Beverley Ratten, lying dead in the kitchen from a shotgun wound to the torso. Her upset husband, Leith Ratten, was removed for questioning. Beverley would later be interred in the Cheltenham Memorial Park, Melbourne.

During interview Ratten said he was cleaning an old rusty double-barrelled shotgun brought in from the garage when it fired, hitting his wife under the left armpit while she was in the kitchen at lunchtime. Ratten could not explain how the gun discharged or how it came to be loaded. Subsequent investigations revealed that Ratten was having an affair with Jennifer Kemp, the wife of a family friend, and had spoken to her on the morning of the shooting. He had also applied for a twelve-month posting to a base in Antarctica.

In January 2012, Ratten died, aged 73 years.

== Trial and appeals ==
Ratten was committed to trial for murder and the hearing took place in August, 1970 in the nearby town of Shepparton, Victoria. Despite the assertions of Ratten's defence counsel that the shooting was accidental and evidence against him was circumstantial, the jury found Ratten guilty and he was sentenced to death. This was later commuted to 25 years' prison.

Following the case, Ratten's lawyers undertook four separate appeals on various grounds, one of which involved the exhumation of Beverley Ratten's body in 1973. All four appeals were dismissed. Despite the failure of his appeals there was considerable doubt about Ratten's conviction, many believing he was found guilty for the questionable morality of his marital infidelity rather than concrete evidence. His case was widely discussed among the legal fraternity while his cause was taken up by many notable lawyers and politicians, such as Don Chipp.

In 1978, the Free Leith Ratten Committee was founded by Monash University law undergraduate, Mark Cowie. Over the next five years, and until Ratten's release from Her Majesty's Prison Dhurringile, Cowie was involved in efforts to bring new evidence before the courts that questioned the legitimacy of Ratten's conviction. He authored an unpublished manuscript on the case, Justice in Shame: The Leith Ratten Case.

Don Chipp said that in 1971 Henry Winneke had told him the convicted murderer Leith Ratten was innocent. In 1981 when Ratten had yet to be released, Chipp said Winneke denied the conversation had taken place. Later, a member of the Supreme Court at the time of Ratten's trial, told Tom Molomby Winneke had wanted to remove the jury from the trial. Such a move would require a belief that the evidence would not support a guilty verdict.

Ratten served his sentence, was a model prisoner and was released in 1983 (whereupon he worked as a surveyor in Queensland). In 1981, two years prior to his release, Ratten was advised he would likely be released and was given time on regular day-release opportunities to find a job, which he did. Then he heard via the radio that he would not be released. Politicians making the decision had allegedly been pressured by Victoria Police to not release Ratten. Further examination of the unfired cartridge was undertaken, with the view that it was indeed a reload cartridge, and he was released soon after.

== Media coverage ==
Ratten's family had been advised that he would be released early if there was no fuss.

But in the late 1970s ABC TV did a program on Ratten in its Beyond Reasonable Doubt series. The program was researched and scripted by Tom Molomby who later organised a campaign lobbying politicians on Ratten's behalf.

A Sunday Observer beat up was severely criticised by the Press Council of Australia.

A book, The Web of Circumstance, by Tom Molomby in 1978 argued Ratten was innocent. And Professor Colin Howard of Melbourne University wrote:

"After reading his scrupulous and impartial account I share the author's belief that there can be no doubt left that Ratten did not murder his wife."
