= Charles Reynolds Brown =

American Congregational clergyman and educator (1862–1950)

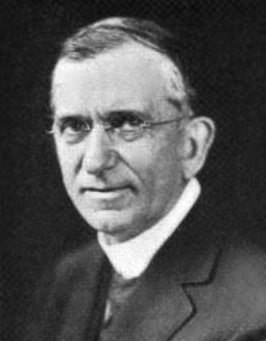
- Born: October 1, 1862; Bethany, West Virginia, US
- Died: November 28, 1950 (aged 88); New Haven, Connecticut, US
- Education: University of Iowa; Boston University
- Occupations: Cleric, educator

Charles Reynolds Brown (October 1, 1862 – November 28, 1950) was an American Congregational clergyman and educator, born in Bethany, West Virginia. He graduated at the University of Iowa in 1883 and studied theology in Boston University. He lectured at various times at Leland Stanford, Yale, Cornell, and Columbia universities, and was pastor of the First Congregational Church at Oakland, California, from 1896 to 1911. In the latter year he became dean of the Yale Divinity School.

Brown was a guest preacher at Central Congregational Church in Providence, Rhode Island.

He died at his home in New Haven, Connecticut on November 28, 1950.

== Works ==
- Two Parables (1898)
- The Main Points (1899)
- The Social Message of the Modern Pulpit (1906)
- The Strange Ways of God, a Study of the Book of Job (1908)
- The Gospel of Good Health (1908)
- Faith and Health (1910)
- The Cap and Gown (1910)
- The Modern Man's Religion (1911)
- The Quest of Life and Other Addresses (1913)
- Living Again (Ingersoll Lecture, 1920)
- Lincoln The Greatest Man of the Nineteenth Century (1922)
- Ten Short Stories from the Bible (1925)
- My Own Yesterdays
- Being Made Over (1939)
