= Sarah Louise Arnold =

American educator, author, suffragist (1859–1943)

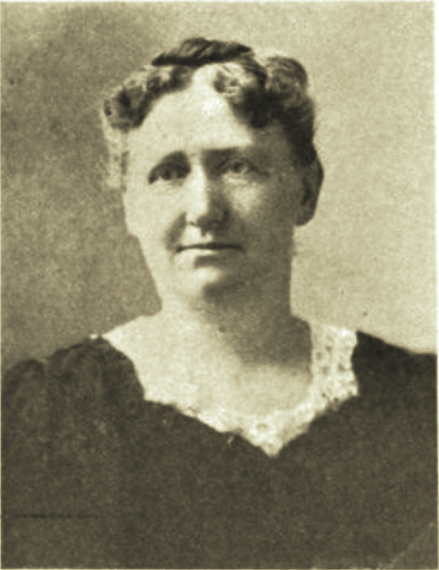
- Born: February 15, 1859; Abington, Massachusetts, United States
- Died: February 26, 1943 (aged 84); Boston, Massachusetts, United States
- Education: Bridgewater Normal School
- Occupations: educator; author
- Writing career
- Language: English
- Genre: textbooks

Sarah Louise Arnold (February 15, 1859 – February 26, 1943) was an American educator, author, and suffragist. She was better known in the schoolroom and among teachers than any other woman connected with education in her day. In 1902, she became the first dean of Simmons College. In 1925, she became the national president of the Girl Scouts. Arnold was also a writer of books for teachers and texts for schools.

== Early life and education ==
Sarah Louise Arnold was born in Abington, Massachusetts, February 15, 1859. She had 14 siblings.

Arnold read Latin at the age of eleven and graduated from high school at the age of thirteen, before graduating from Bridgewater Normal School (now, Bridgewater State University).

== Career ==
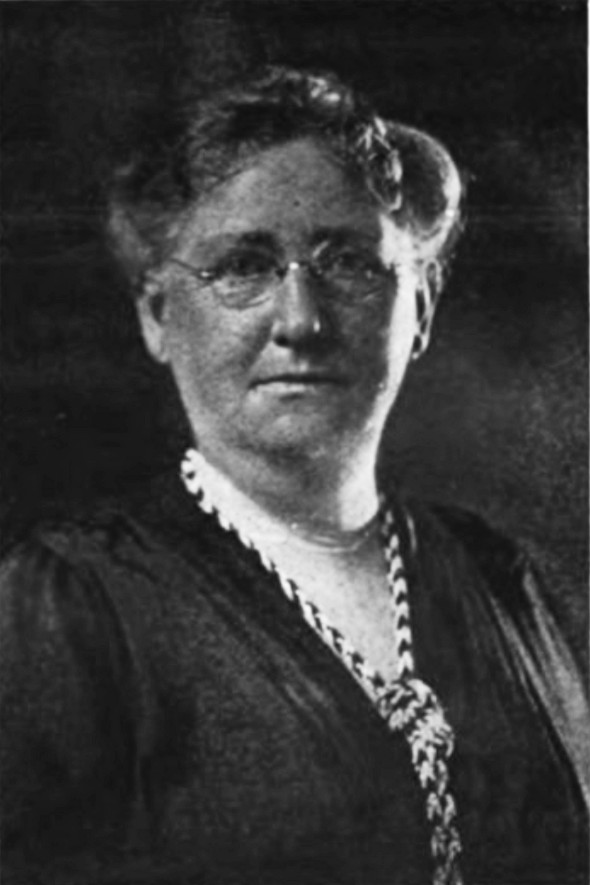
1922

Arnold was the Supervisor of Primary Education in Minneapolis, Minnesota. From 1895 to 1902, she was the Supervisor of Schools in Boston, Massachusetts.

In 1902, Arnold became the first dean of Simmons College (now Simmons University). Until then, no woman had occupied so high a place in the U.S. educational system for the same length of time. She stated that she owed much of her success to Emerson E. White's course of lectures at the Martha's Vineyard Summer Institute when she was a young teacher, these courses showing her how possible and important it was to think clearly and vigorously.

In 1922, Arnold resigned the responsibilities of active leadership in Simmons College in order to become an educator-at-large. Her highest inspirations were given through public speech. She spoke in nearly every state of the U.S. During World War I, the Federal Food Administration sent her to the colleges and universities of the country to make addresses, including several at the state and national meetings of the General Federation of Women's Clubs. An address made in the early 1920s in the Cincinnati Music Hall was heard by an audience of more than 3,000.

During the period of 1925 to 1928, she served as national president of the Girl Scouts. During that time, her theme was education.

Arnold wrote textbooks on the topics of literature and grammar. These included, Stepping Stones to Literature, Arnold Primer, and Waymarks for Teachers. Published in 1934, The Way of Understanding focused on Girl Scout leadership.

She was also an active suffragist, prominent in various suffrage organizations. In 1913, Arnold served as president of American Home Economics Association. She also served on the Advisory Council of Better Homes in America, and on the Advisory Committee of "The Committee of Awards of the Popular Radio Medal for Conspicuous Service". Arnold was an honorary vice-president of the Women's Municipal League of Boston.

== Death and legacy ==
Arnold made her home in Newton Centre, Massachusetts, and later in Boston at Hotel Graylan. She died at the hotel, February 26, 1943. Her papers are held by Simmons University.

== Selected works ==
- Waymarks for Teachers, 1894
- Stepping Stones to Literature, 1897 (with Charles Benajah Gilbert)
- Reading; how to teach it, 1899
- The Arnold Primer, 1901
- The Mother Tongue, 1905 OCLC 18285171

- Book I.-Lessons in Speaking. Reading and Writing English (with George Lyman Kittredge)
- Book II.-An Elementary English Grammar with Lessons in Composition (with George Lyman Kittredge)
- Book III.-The Elements of English Composition. (with John Have Gardiner and George Lyman Kittredge)

- The mastery of words, 1916
- The story of the Sargent industrial school at Beacon, New York, 1891–1916, 1917
- The Way of Understanding, 1934
