= John Harber Phillips =

Australian lawyer and judge (1933–2009)

The Honourable John Phillips AC QC

Chief Justice of Victoria
- In office 17 December 1991 – 17 October 2003
- Preceded by: John Young
- Succeeded by: Marilyn Warren

Judge of the Supreme Court of Victoria
- In office 7 November 1984 – 13 August 1990
- Preceded by: Kevin Anderson
- Succeeded by: David Ashley

Personal details
- Born: 18 October 1933 Melbourne, Victoria, Australia
- Died: 7 August 2009 (aged 75) Melbourne, Victoria, Australia
- Education: University of Melbourne

John Harber Phillips, AC, QC (18 October 1933 – 7 August 2009) was an Australian lawyer and judge who served as Chief Justice of Victoria from 1991 to 2003. He was first appointed to the Victorian Supreme Court in 1984, having previously been the state's director of public prosecutions as well as a director of the National Crime Authority.

== Early years ==
Phillips was born on 18 October 1933 in Melbourne to parents Anthony Michael and Ivy Muriel Phillips. He attended Presentation Convent and De La Salle College, Malvern and then undertook his tertiary education at the University of Melbourne where he obtained an LL.B. degree. He undertook his legal articles at the firm of Dooley & Breen solicitors. He was called to the Victorian Bar in 1959 and read with Victor Belson. He became a Member of the Victorian Bar Council in 1974 and continued to be a member of that Council until 1984. He also served as chairman of the Victorian Criminal Bar Association. He became a Queen's Counsel in 1975 and then a member of Middle Temple at the English Bar in 1979.

== Legal career ==
In 1982 he was engaged to defend Lindy Chamberlain against a charge of murdering her daughter, Azaria. His co-counsel Andrew Kirkham in the trial remarked that Phillips was "one of the best trial lawyers in the country". His skills as counsel were described as being that of a "very elegant street fighter, swift and deceptive". However, Phillips was unable to convince the jury of Chamberlain's innocence. As a result of the trial, he lobbied Victorian Premier Jeff Kennett for the introduction of an independent forensics institute in Victoria. His lobbying efforts were successful, although he put down his success as being able to ask Kennett shortly after his elevation to Premier. Phillips went on to become the Chairman of the Victorian Institute of Forensic Medicine at its inception in 1985, subsequently the National Institute of Forensic Science at its inception in 1992.

In February 1983 he became Victoria's first Director of Public Prosecutions. In the following year he was appointed a Justice of the Supreme Court of Victoria, holding that appointment until 1990. In 1990 he was appointed chairman of the National Crime Authority and also at the same time he also was appointed a Justice of the Federal Court of Australia. As head of the National Crime Authority and also Victoria’s Director of Public Prosecutions he worked to improve the efficiency of the Courts.

He was appointed as Chief Justice of Victoria in 1991. Phillips was appointed to the court under Attorney General Jim Kennan. At the time, critics privately labelled Phillips as not being a “legal luminary” and that he had not delivered any “significant rulings“ prior to his appointment.

As Chief Justice, Phillips introduced innovations to Victoria's courts. He appointed Australia's first “Courts Media Liaison Committee” in 1993. He also permitted courts to be used in television and film productions, and organised regular workshops for journalists on the legal pitfalls of court reporting conducted by the Courts Information Officer. He also introduced Open Days at the Court in which he personally gave guided tours of the court building.

As Chief Justice, he led what was called the “Spring Offensive”. This offensive involved every judge in the Supreme Court hearing civil cases for a month. The judges worked in teams of ten and disposed of over 1000 cases. The success of that offensive led to another offensive which was termed the “Autumn Offensive” to deal with the remaining backlog of civil cases. He introduced a mediation programme in 1995 and introduced pre-trial management under the “Pegasus Two” programme in 1998 for criminal trials. It was also during his time as chief justice that the Victorian Court of Appeal was introduced in 1995, replacing the Full Court of the Supreme Court of Victoria.

In 1998 he was made a Companion of the Order of Australia (AC) for "services to the law, law reform, literature and the visual arts". In 2002, he was the Inaugural Chairperson of the Judicial College of Victoria, and he was also the chair of Working Party that set the college up. He presided over a ceremony that marked appointment of notaries locally rather than by the Archbishop of Canterbury. Victoria University awarded him an honorary Doctorate of Laws for his "exceptional contribution to the law and law reform" on 5 August 2003.

== Retirement ==
Phillips retired on 17 October 2003 when he turned 70, which is the compulsory retirement age for judges in Victoria. He was chief justice for 12 years. At his retirement ceremony he remarked upon receiving a summons to serve on a jury that explained about the standard of proof in criminal cases. He quipped to the court that he thought that "he knew that already". His retirement dinner was held in the Queen Hall at the Victorian Parliament House on 17 October 2003. At the dinner, Phillips talked about Italian judge Giovanni Falcone who was murdered in Sicily by explosives placed under a road. Phillips described him as one of his “judicial heroes”. At the dinner, the Attorney General described Phillips as “a man who thinks before he speaks, who measures his words and makes each one count”.

He was Patron of the Victorian Women Lawyers (VWL) and patron of Australian Greek Welfare. He was appointed provost of the Sir Zelman Cowan Centre at Victoria University, a joint venture with Cambridge University that provides continuing legal education for lawyers. He had written plays, poetry, a biography, a textbook called “Advocacy with Honour” and had also written a book about Australian criminal Ned Kelly. In December 2003 he appeared at Victoria Law School as Ned Kelly in the dramatisation of his play An Irish Tragedy.

John Harber Phillips died on 7 August 2009, aged 75, after a long illness.

== Sources ==
- "On Solid Ground" (PDF) (127). Victorian Bar News. 2003: 16. Archived from the original (PDF) on 26 July 2008.
- Who's Who Australia.

Legal offices
Preceded by Sir John Young	Chief Justice of the Supreme Court of Victoria; 1991–2003	Succeeded by Marilyn Warren
