= William Douglas Mackenzie =

William Douglas Mackenzie, D.D., LL.D. (July 16, 1859 – 1936) was an American Congregational theologian, born at Fauresmith, Orange River Colony, South Africa, educated in Edinburgh at Watson's College School (1875) and at the Congregational Theological Hall (1880–82). He studied at Göttingen, then emigrated to the United States whereat he served as professor of systematic theology at Chicago Theological Seminary at Hartford from 1895 to 1903, president of the Hartford Seminary after 1904, and served as President Emeritus of the Hartford Seminary Foundation from 1930–?. Mackenzie was also a member of the Hartford Civitan Club.

He was author of:

- The Ethics of Gambling (1893, new edition, 1911)
- The Revelation of Christ (1896)
- Christianity and the Progress of Man (1897)
- South Africa: Its History, Heroes, and Wars (1899)
- A biography of his father, John Mackenzie, South African Missionary and Statesman (1902)
- The Final Faith (1910)
- Galatians and Romans, in the Westminster New Testament (1912)
- Man's Consciousness of Immortality, (the Ingersoll Lecture, 1929)
- The Christ of the Christian Faith, (?, ?)
- Paternoster Sheen or Light On Man's Destiny, (Harper & Brothers Publishers, 1933)
