= Mount Fiske Glacier =

Glacier in California, United States

- Location within California
- Type: Mountain glacier
- Location: Kings Canyon National Park, Fresno County, California, United States
- Coordinates: 37°08′20″N 118°39′58″W
- Length: .10 mi (0.16 km)
- Terminus: Talus
- Status: Retreating

Mount Fiske Glacier is a small glacier located in the Sierra Nevada Range within Kings Canyon National Park in the U.S. state of California. The glacier is on the north slope of Mount Fiske (13,503 ft (4,116 m)) and .70 mi (1.13 km) northwest of Mount Warlow Glacier.

== See also ==
- List of glaciers in the United States
