= George Lyman Kittredge =

American scholar, literary critic, and folklorist (1860–1941)

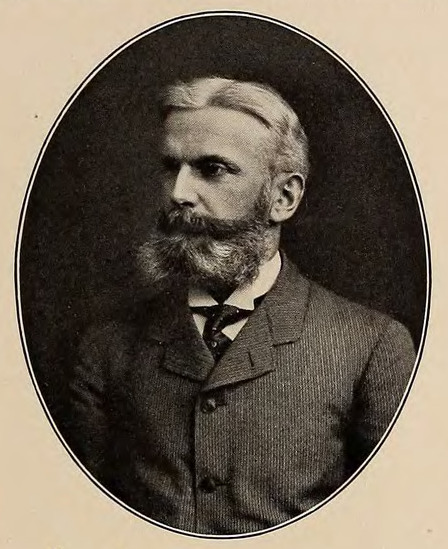
- A 1906 portrait of Kittredge
- Born: February 28, 1860; Boston, Massachusetts, U.S.
- Died: July 23, 1941 (aged 81); Barnstable, Massachusetts, U.S.
- Education: Harvard University
- Occupations: English professor, folklorist
- Spouse: Frances Eveline Gordon

George Lyman Kittredge (February 28, 1860 – July 23, 1941) was a professor of English literature at Harvard University. His scholarly edition of the works of William Shakespeare was influential in the early 20th century. He was also involved in American folklore studies and was instrumental in the formation and management of the Harvard University Press. One of his better-known books concerned witchcraft in England and New England.

== Early life and education ==
Kittredge was born in Boston, Massachusetts, on February 28, 1860. His father, Edward "Kit" Lyman Kittredge, had participated in the California Gold Rush of 1849, had been shipwrecked, and had walked 700 miles across the desert before returning to Boston to marry a widow, Mrs. Deborah Lewis Benson, and start a family. Their precocious and bookish son George attended The Roxbury Latin School, which then had about a hundred pupils. George consistently led his class in marks and won a scholarship to Harvard, which he entered in 1878.

As a freshman, George lived at home in Boston and walked to Harvard every day to save money. Kittredge garnered highest honors and joined several clubs, wrote light verse, and won Bowdoin prizes for his essays and translations, including one from English into Attic Greek. He also became a member of the editorial board of the Harvard Advocate, the college literary magazine. In 1881 Kittredge was the prompter and pronunciation coach in a celebrated undergraduate theatrical performance of Sophocles's Oedipus Rex in the original Greek, attended by Ralph Waldo Emerson, Julia Ward Howe, William Dean Howells, Charles Eliot Norton, Henry Wadsworth Longfellow, and classicist B. L. Gildersleeve of Johns Hopkins University. In 1882, Kittredge was elected Ivy Orator, and charged to deliver a humorous speech to his graduating class. Graduating with Kittredge that year was Philadelphian Owen Wister, who authored the first Western novel, The Virginian.

== Career ==
Lack of money prevented Kittredge from immediately pursuing graduate studies. From 1883 to 1887, he taught Latin at Phillips Exeter Academy. About six feet tall and, at 140 pounds, slightly built, Kittredge impressed his prep-school students with his exacting standards, sense of humor, and apparent ability to converse fluently in Latin.

=== Harvard University ===
Kittredge joined the faculty at Harvard as an instructor in the autumn of 1888. He was soon promoted and in 1896 succeeded Professor Francis James Child as Professor of the Division of Modern Languages, which included languages other than Latin or Greek. He and Child had shared the teaching of Harvard's English 2 course of William Shakespeare, which Kittredge took over solely in 1896 following Child's death. Because Child had died without quite finishing his work of ballad scholarship, Child's publishers asked Kittredge to see the project through to publication and to supply a short introduction to the five-volume opus. Later, Kittredge helped expand ballad and folklore studies to include American folklore, serving in 1904 as president of the American Folklore Society. Kittredge also took over Child's graduate course in the English and Scottish popular ballad.

English 2, a Shakespeare class for which Kittredge became well known at the university, was a lecture course of about 275 Harvard students. Other courses and subjects which Kittredge taught or co-taught were English 28, a survey course covering Chaucer, the epic, and the ballad; Historical English Grammar, and Anglo-Saxon, a prerequisite for his course in Beowulf. In the German department, Kittredge taught Icelandic, Old Norse, and, for many years, a course in German mythology. His graduate courses included Germanic and Celtic Religions, which he co-taught with F. N. Robinson, a Celticist, English Metrical Romances, including Sir Gawain and the Green Knight, Sir Orfeo, and Child's ballad course.

Kittredge's students included Francis Peabody Magoun, Oscar James Campbell Jr., Franklin Delano Roosevelt, John A. Lomax, whose lectures and collection of cowboy ballads Kittredge later supported, and the folklorists Robert Winslow Gordon, James Madison Carpenter, William S. Burroughs and Stith Thompson. Among the most popular of Harvard's teachers throughout his career, Kittredge's students affectionately nicknamed him "Kitty". Kittredge was named Gurney Professor of English at Harvard in 1917. He retired from teaching in 1936 and continued to work on his edition of Shakespeare until his death in 1941, in Barnstable, Massachusetts.

=== Radcliffe College ===
Women were not admitted to Harvard University until several decades after Kittredge's lifetime, but Kittredge made trips to Radcliffe College to teach a Shakespeare course for women that was similar to Harvard's English 2.

== Scholarship ==
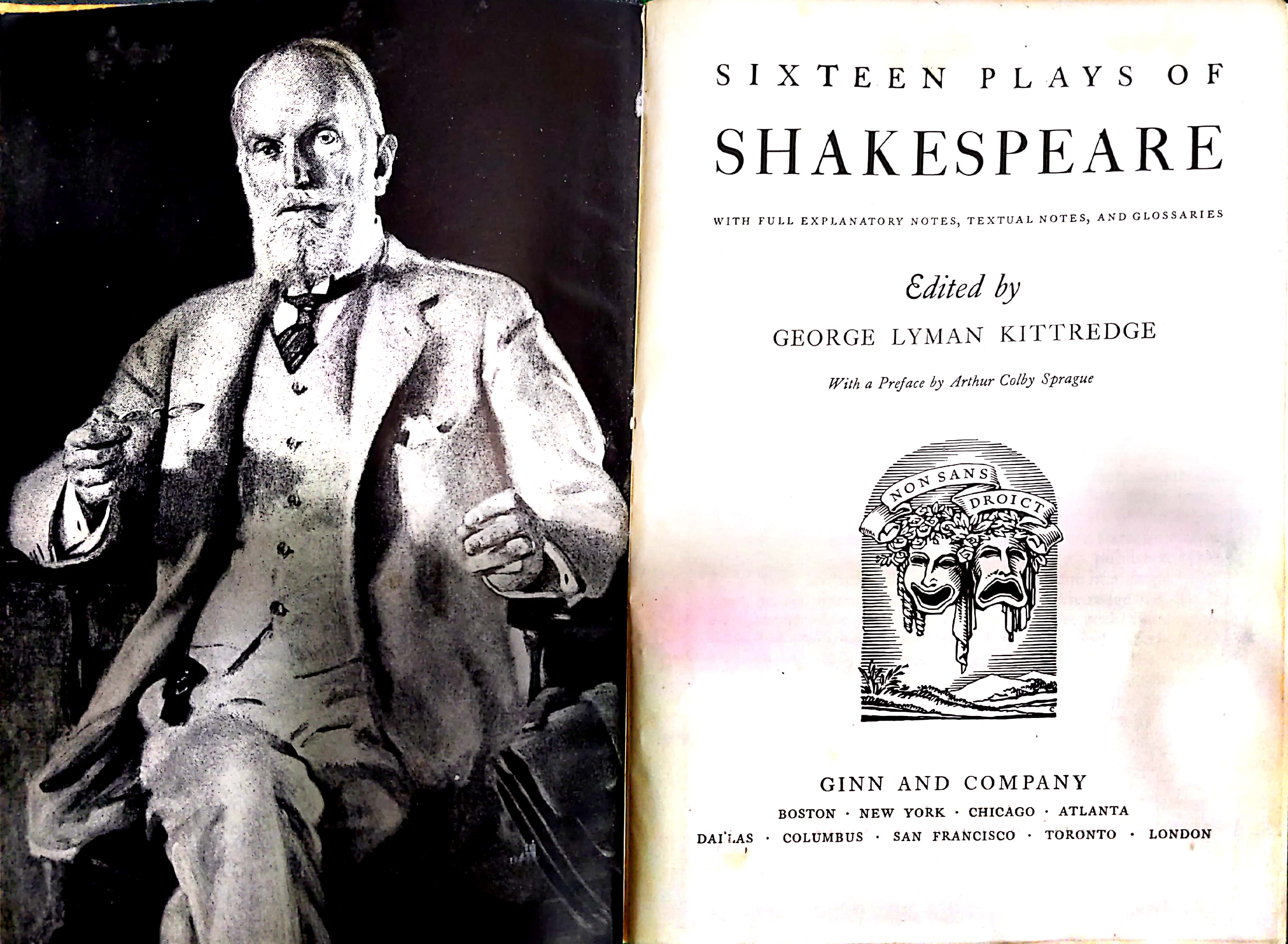
The first page of a 1946 edition of Kittredge's Sixteen Plays of Shakespeare

Kittredge's edition of Shakespeare was the standard well beyond his death and continues to be cited occasionally. He was also arguably the leading critic of Geoffrey Chaucer of his time and is considered largely responsible for introducing Chaucer into the canon of college English. His essay on "Chaucer's Discussion of Marriage" (1912) has traditionally been credited with introducing the idea of the "marriage group" in the Canterbury Tales, though he was not the originator of this phrase. Through his historical researches Kittredge also identified Thomas Malory, author of Le Morte d'Arthur (1485), and hitherto an obscure figure, with a knight and member of Parliament who served with the Earl of Warwick, a discovery that paved the way for further researches into Malory by Edward Hicks, to whose 1928 book on Malory's turbulent career Kittredge supplied the introduction. Kittredge's work on Sir Gawain and the Green Knight was influential as well.

Kittredge also collected folk tales and songs, writing extensively on the folk lore of New England and on the New England witch trials. He also wrote and co-wrote introductory Latin and English grammar text books. While still teaching at Phillips Exeter he undertook the general editorship of popular English masterpieces for the general public published by the Atheneum Press. At Harvard he collaborated with E. S. Sheldon in editing eleven volumes of the Harvard Studies and Notes in Philology and Literature, which appeared in 1907, and was a founding member and supervisor of the Harvard University Press. His popular book, written in collaboration with J. B. Greenough, Words and their Ways in English Speech (1901) met with great success and served as a storehouse for teachers. Kittredge was also responsible for the revision of the English used in a translation of the Psalms for the Jewish Publication Society, issued in 1903.

According to his biographer, "Neither Child nor Kittredge, trained classicists and able linguists, had themselves bothered to undergo the limitations of a Ph. D. degree". There is a widely circulated story that when asked why he did not have one, Kittredge was supposed to have replied, "But who would examine me?" However, according to Clifton Fadiman, "Kittredge always maintained that the question was never asked, and if it had been he would never have dreamed of answering in such a manner." On May 17, 1932, during a lecture tour of England, Oxford University conferred on him a D.Litt. honoris causa. Burdened with no illusions about his erudition, or the lack of it in others, he famously remarked, "There are three persons who know what the word 'Victorian' means, and the other two are dead."

=== Influence on literary studies ===
Kittredge and Child belonged to the philological school of scholarship pioneered in 19th century German universities. Philology, especially in its early years, had been conceived as a "total science of civilization, an ideal originally formulated for the study of classical antiquity and then transferred by the German Romanticists to the modern languages.

When the various modern language departments were introduced into American universities in the 1880s, speakers at the first meeting of the Modern Language Association in 1883 had been concerned to counter the popular perception that "English literature is a subject for the desultory reader in his leisure hours rather than an intellectual study for serious workers", a mere "accomplishment", whereas when "a boy studies Greek you know he has worked hard". Philology "met the desire for facts, for accuracy, and for the imitation of the scientific method which had acquired such an overwhelming prestige" in the United States. It had yielded the discoveries of the Grimms and others, tracing the step-by-step relationships of classical and modern European to ancient Indian languages and their evolutionary development. A former Harvard graduate student, James H. Hanford, reminisced how under Kittredge,

Students were expected to talk in a scholarly way in the classroom and on a final examination about Grimm's or Verner's laws, the differentiating characteristics of Anglo-Saxon among the Teutonic languages, the changes in English phonology, inflection, and syntax from Anglo-Saxon times to the sixteenth century, the influence of Danish, French and Latin on the English language in its various periods. But these phases of language development were closely associated with the entire cultural history of which they were a part. The philologist is the person who makes his approach to the past through the phenomenon of language. "In the beginning was the word." The objective was the equipment of a man of real erudition, about whose professional and scientific status there should be no doubt and who could hold up his head in pride among his fellows in the older and more reputable field of classics ... Source and background study, so decried by [later] critics of the philological regime, was conceived of both as a means of interpretation and as an independent contribution to cultural history.

Undergraduate Shakespeare students were required to read six plays extremely slowly and to virtually memorize the texts. "It is the purpose of this course", Kittredge used to remark, "to find out what Shakespeare said and what he meant when he said it." Where Professor Child had often been imposed on in the classroom by students who took advantage of his extremely sweet nature, Kittredge's dramatic classroom manner kept his students on the edge of their seats – lateness, wearing of hats, yawning, and coughing (one student was permanently expelled from the class for this offense) were strictly forbidden. His manner with his graduate students was entirely different. With them he was extremely collegial and invited them to his home for weekly fireside gatherings. There, in dim light, the students read papers which, with his encouragement, would often form the nucleus of subsequent dissertations.

As chairman of the Division of the Modern Languages Division of Harvard, a position he inherited from Child, Kittredge was in a position to set graduate degree requirements and he insisted that graduate literature candidates master several foreign languages, as he himself had done. Neither he nor Child wished the modern languages to replace the study of Greek and Latin, and Kittredge would oppose Harvard president Charles W. Eliot's efforts to abolish Greek as a requirement for graduation.

Kittredge's administrative power, vast erudition, prestige, and the histrionic attitude he assumed with undergraduates provoked resentment. A notable critic was his colleague, Irving Babbitt (a professor of French) and Babbitt's former student, Stuart Sherman, who together founded so-called "New Humanist" school of literary appreciation. In a famous article in The Nation of 1913, Sherman accused Kittredge of pedantry and of squeezing the life out of his subject. Deep ideological disagreements lay at the bottom of these attacks. The New Humanists were social and cultural conservatives who conceived of literary studies as leading to moral improvement by providing a guide to conduct and "humane insight" through an appreciation of and reflection on the timeless beauties of prescribed "great works." Babbitt bitterly opposed the introduction of elective courses for undergraduates. Deeply suspicious of democracy, he envisioned the goal of a university education as the formation of a superior individual in whom the "will to restraint" would counter what he saw as the degenerate modernism he traced back to pernicious ideas of social progress initiated by Rousseau and his followers. Kittredge and his students, on the other hand, situated the study of languages and literatures in their historical contexts, seeking to capture "the spirit of an age" and often ranging far afield of the traditional Western canon. For Kittredge, reading Chaucer illuminated the world of the Middle Ages, which Kittredge often stated had points in common with our own age and thus helped students understand the world in which we live. Often he guided his students into newly opening fields that he had not had time to investigate, such as Finnish and Celtic studies. According to David Bynum:

In an age of literary ethnocentricity, Kittredge was as readily and as genuinely interested in Russian ballads or American Indian folktales as in the plays of Shakespeare ... Kittredge's intellectual hospitality toward "foreign" traditions and his equanimity toward "vulgar" ones appear in retrospect as the most important sources of his influence.

For Babbitt, a self-proclaimed classicist, on the other hand, such disciplines as anthropology, folklore, and the medieval scholarship so dear to Kittredge, represented a dilution of the real goal of literary studies and a waste of time. Kittredge's students and colleagues defended him vigorously, however. One former student, Elizabeth Jackson, writes of Kittredge's sheer enthusiasm: "Kittredge taught Shakespeare as though every single human being could go on reading Shakespeare through time and eternity, going from strength to strength and rejoicing as a strong man to join a race." As the decade of the 1920s unfolded, the New Humanists began to seem increasingly irrelevant, and as the Depression of the 1930s hit, the intellectual climate turned decidedly leftward and other forms of criticism emerged, initially from writers outside the academy, some of which, in the coming decades would be incorporated as aspects of the New Criticism. Meanwhile, although there was continued chafing against the supposed antiquarianism of the philological school in some quarters, Kittredge's prestige and influence continued unabated, and the extensive list of language requirements for a Harvard graduate degree in English literature, including Old and Middle English, Old French, and Gothic, stayed in effect until his retirement in 1936, after which these requirements, viewed as onerous, were dropped. With the coming of the Cold War in the late 1940s, 1950s and early 1960s disagreements between the historical and "literary appreciation" schools in English literature studies were subsumed by the ascendancy of the New Criticism which favored, like Kittredge, rigorous study of literary text, but sidestepped potential controversies over ideology by ruling out mention of historical context or social questions. In consequence, the concept of philology itself fell into disrepute and never recovered, even after social engagement once again became respectable and the New Criticism gave way to Structuralism, Gender Studies, postmodernism, and the New Historicism. Thus, the context of Kittredge's prestige and his place in the history of English literature studies became obscured and forgotten, a situation which in recent years some scholars are attempting to rectify. As Jill Terry Rudy writes:

In the process of overthrowing Kittredge's perceived pedantry in order to enshrine New Critical methods of rigorous research and institutional control over graduate training and doctoral degrees (without offering the concomitant grounding in cultural history and linguistic concerns that Kittredge promoted), New Critical literary scholars assured that the term philology itself would be denigrated and then ignored as their newly trained graduate students conquered the vocabulary and intricacies of critical scholarship (Wellek 1953). As suggested previously, the philosophical methods and ideologies that informed the early history of English department organization deserve continued conversation and critique rather than simply being erased or ignored.

== Personal life ==
In 1886, Kittredge married Frances Eveline Gordon, the daughter of Nathaniel Gordon and Alcina Eveline Sanborn. Her father was a lawyer and philanthropist who had served as president of the New Hampshire Senate and was a deacon in the Second Church of Exeter, New Hampshire. The couple honeymooned in Europe, remaining for a year in Germany, which at that time was a mecca of graduate studies and the mother of distinguished philologists and folklorists. Kittredge had already studied German and, although not formally matriculated, attended courses at the universities of Leipzig and Tübingen, in Old Icelandic and other subjects. In 1887, he published an article for "a learned German periodical" on "A Point In Beowulf." The couple had three children: Francis Gordon (1887–1973), Henry Crocker (1890–1967), and Dora (1893–1974).

== Major works ==
- Observations on the Language of Chaucer's Troilus, 1894.
- Professor Child, 1897.
- Chaucer and Some of his Friends, 1903.
- Arthur and Gorlagon, 1903.
- The Mother Tongue, 1902, with Sarah Louise Arnold.
- Notes on Witchcraft, 1907.
- Chaucer's Discussion of Marriage, 1912.
- An Advanced English Grammar, with Exercises, 1913.
- Chaucer and his Poetry, 1915.
- A Study of Gawain and the Green Knight, 1916.
- The Old Farmer and His Almanack, 1920.
- Witchcraft in Old and New England, 1929.
- The Complete Works of Shakespeare, 1936.
- The Old Teutonic Idea of the Future Life (the Ingersoll Lecture, 1937)

== Legacy and Honors ==
Kittredge was elected to the American Academy of Arts and Sciences in 1898. He was elected a member of the American Antiquarian Society in 1901. In 1905, he was elected to the American Philosophical Society.
