= Affair in Havana =

1957 film directed by László Benedek

- Theatrical release poster
- Directed by: László Benedek
- Screenplay by: Burton Lane; Maurice Zimm
- Based on: Original story by Janet Green
- Produced by: Richard Goldstone
- Starring: John Cassavetes; Raymond Burr
- Cinematography: Alan Stensvold
- Edited by: Stefan Arnsten
- Music by: Ernest Gold
- Production company: Dudley Productions
- Distributed by: Allied Artists Pictures
- Release date: October 1, 1957
- Running time: 77 minutes
- Country: United States
- Language: English

Affair in Havana is a 1957 American film noir crime film directed by László Benedek and written by Maurice Zimm. It stars Raymond Burr and John Cassavetes.

The film is about a piano player who falls in love with a crippled man's wife.

== Plot ==
Mallabee is a millionaire sugar-cane grower in Cuba who blames his wife, Lorna, for an accident that has left him in a wheelchair.

Lorna has been having an affair with Nick, a piano player in a Havana nightclub. Mallabee secretly is aware of this affair, having hired a private investigator to follow his wife.

The twisted mind of Mallabee has come up with a scheme in which Lorna kills him. She won't do it, but a trusted servant, Valdes, does cause his death by drowning. However, the relationship between Nick and Lorna comes to an unhappy end.

== Cast ==
- John Cassavetes as Nick
- Raymond Burr as Mallabee
- Sara Shane as Lorna
- Lilia Lazo as Fina
- Sergio Pena as Valdes
- Celia Cruz as Singer
- Jose Antonio Rivero as Rivero
- Miguel Angel Blanco as Captain of Police

== Production ==
The film started as an original screenplay The Passionate Prisoner by British writer Janet Green. Green was borrowed from England's Rank Organisation. The film was meant to be the first in a series of English-language movies shot in Cuba by Dudley Pictures over five years. To finance these movies, Dudley had an agreement with the Agricultural and Industrial Development Bank of Cuba (BANFAIC) which set up a $1,000,000 revolving fund. The next film was to be Location Havana. Carl Dudley was head of Dudley Pictures while Dick Goldstone was the producer. The film was rewritten and retitled The Fever Tree.

Filming started in Havana on 6 August 1956. It was the fourth American film shot in Cuba that year, the others being The Sharkfighters, The Big Boodle and The Old Man and the Sea. The film was shot in and around Havana and the resort town of Varadero. Locations included beach at Varadero, roof garden of the Ambos Mundos Hotel, Jose Marti International Airport and Cathedral Plaza in Havana. Burr made the film just prior to shooting the pilot for Perry Mason.

The title was changed to Affair in Havana in July 1957.

== Reception ==
Variety wrote the film "relies on the beauties of Cuba and the charm of Afro-Cuban music to take it out of the just-so class." John Cassavetes was paid $25,000 to appear in the movie; he also insisted the script be rewritten and was accompanied on set by Burton Lane, even though the other writer Maurice Zimm was also on location.

== See also ==
- List of American films of 1957
