= John Fiske (philosopher) =

American philosopher and historian (1842–1901)

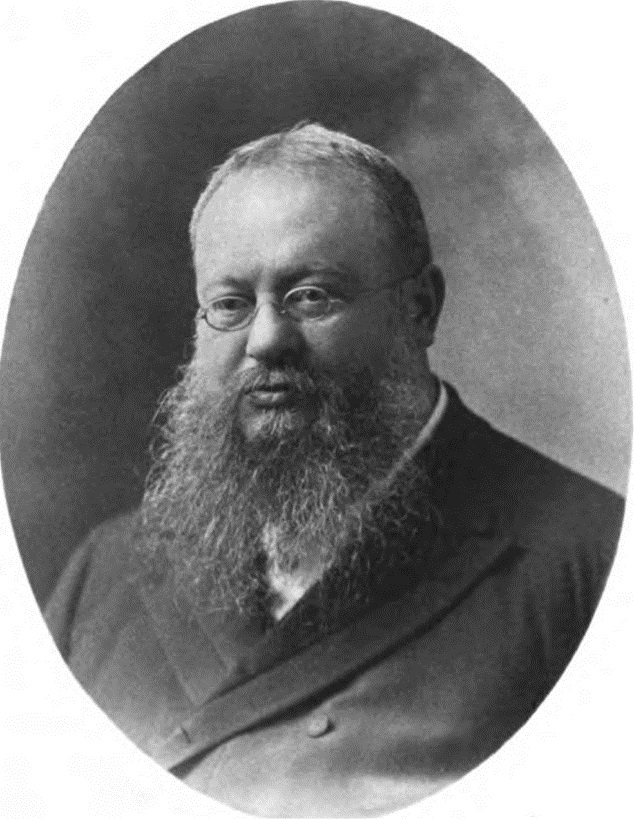
- Born: Edmund Fiske Green; March 30, 1842; Hartford, Connecticut, U.S.
- Died: July 4, 1901 (aged 59); Gloucester, Massachusetts, U.S.

Education
- Education: Harvard University

Philosophical work
- Era: 19th-century philosophy
- Region: Western philosophy

Signature
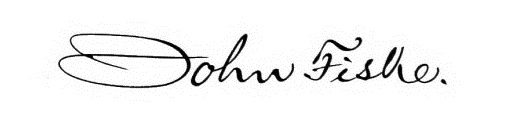

John Fiske (March 30, 1842 – July 4, 1901) was an American philosopher and historian. He was heavily influenced by Herbert Spencer and applied Spencer's concepts of evolution to his own writings on linguistics, philosophy, religion, and history.

== Biography ==
John Fiske was born Edmund Fiske Green at Hartford, Connecticut, March 30, 1842. He was the only child of Edmund Brewster Green, of Smyrna, Delaware, and Mary Fiske Bound, of Middletown, Connecticut. His father was editor of newspapers in Hartford, New York City, and Panama, where he died in 1852, and his widow married Edwin W. Stoughton, of New York, in 1855. On the second marriage of his mother, Edmund Fiske Green assumed the name of his maternal great-grandfather, John Fiske.

As a child, Fiske exhibited remarkable precocity. He lived at Middletown with his grandmother during childhood, and prior to his entering college he had read widely in English literature and history, had excelled in Greek and Latin work, and had studied several modern languages. He then entered Harvard, and graduated from Harvard College in 1863 and from Harvard Law School in 1865. He was admitted to the bar in 1864, but only briefly practiced law. His career as author began in 1861, with an article on "Mr. Buckle's Fallacies" published in the National Quarterly Review. Following his failure to earn enough money through law, he frequently contributed freelance articles to American and British periodicals.

From 1869 to 1871, he was university lecturer on philosophy at Harvard, in 1870 instructor in history there, and assistant librarian 1872–1879. On resigning the latter position in 1879, he was elected a member of the board of overseers, and at the expiration of the six-year term was re-elected in 1885. Beginning in 1881, he lectured annually on American history at Washington University in St. Louis and beginning in 1884 held a professorship of American history at that institution, but continued to make his home in Cambridge, Massachusetts. He lectured on American history at University College London in 1879, and at the Royal Institution of Great Britain in 1880. He gave many hundreds of lectures, chiefly upon American history, in the principal cities of the United States and Great Britain. Fiske was elected a member of the American Antiquarian Society in 1884.

The largest part of his life was devoted to the study of history, but at an early age inquiries into the nature of human progress led him to a careful study of the doctrine of evolution, and it was through the popularization of Herbert Spencer's work that he first became known to the public. He applied himself to the philosophical interpretation of Darwin's work and produced many books and essays on this subject. His philosophy was influenced by Herbert Spencer's views on evolution. In a letter from Charles Darwin to John Fiske, dated from 1874, the naturalist remarks: "I never in my life read so lucid an expositor (and therefore thinker) as you are."

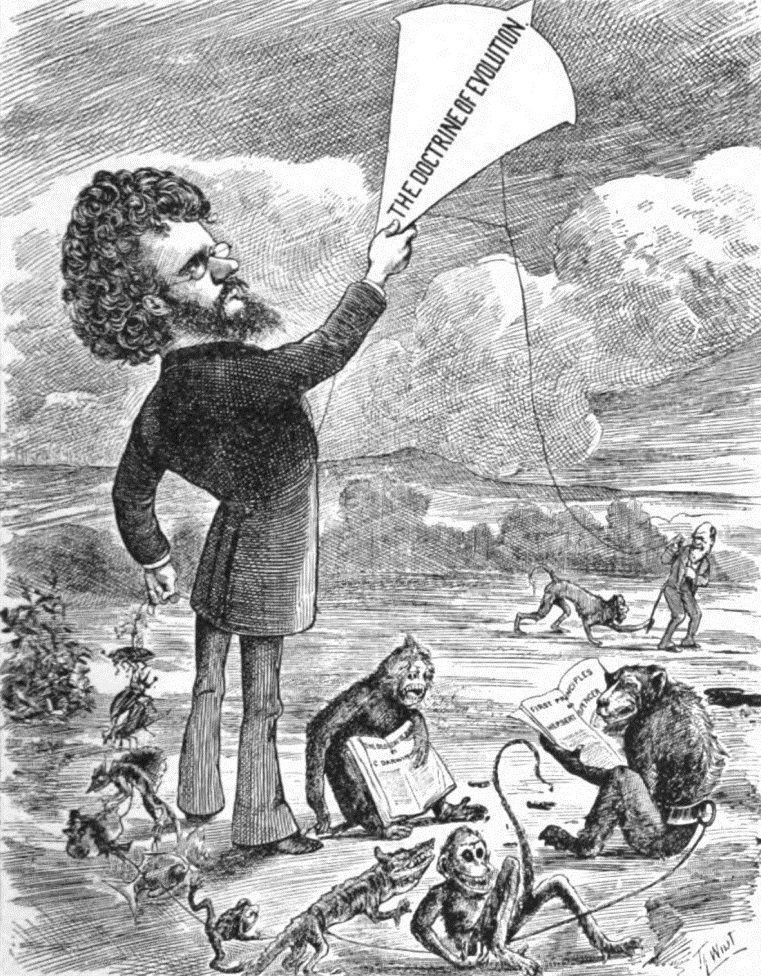
"Professor John Fiske flies the evolution kite in America." – Daily Graphic, September 12, 1874.

Nineteenth-century enthusiasm for brain size as a simple measure of human performance, championed by scientists including Darwin's cousin Francis Galton and the French neurologist Paul Broca, led Fiske to believe in the racial superiority of the "Anglo-Saxon race". Fiske's beliefs on race did not preclude his commitment to abolitionist causes. Indeed, so anti-slavery was he that twenty-three years after the cessation of the American Civil War, he declared the North's victory complete "despite the feeble wails" of "unteachable bigots." In his book "The Destiny of Man" (1884), he devotes a whole chapter to the "End of the working of natural selection upon man", describing it as "a fact of unparalleled grandeur." In his view, "the action of natural selection upon Man has [...] been essentially diminished through the operation of social conditions."

In books such as Outlines of Cosmic Philosophy (ISBN 0-384-15780-7), Fiske aimed to show that "in reality there has never been any conflict between religion and science, nor is any reconciliation called for where harmony has always existed." On page 364, he demonstrates his sensitivity to Christianity as a religion:

We arrive at a deeper reason than has hitherto been disclosed for the difference between our position with reference to Christianity, and that which has been assumed by Radicalism and by positivism. It is not merely that we refuse to attack Christianity because we recognize its necessary adaptation to a certain stage of culture, not yet passed by the average minds of the community; it is that we still regard Christianity as, in the deepest sense, our own religion.

Fiske was a popular lecturer on these topics in his early career, and many of his books from the 1870s were first given to the public in the form of lectures or magazine articles, revised and collected under a general title. Of these, in The Destiny of Man Viewed in the Light of his Origin (1884), he argues that intellectual force is a later, higher and more potent thing than bodily strength, leading to a moral and non-selfish line of thought. This intellect may or must be enduring, or at its best immortal. In The Idea of God as Affected by Modern Knowledge (1885), Fiske discusses the theistic problem, and declares that the mind of man, as developed, becomes an illuminating indication of the mind of God, which as a great immanent cause includes and controls both physical and moral forces.

Later he turned to historical writings, publishing books such as The Discovery of America (1892). In addition, he edited, with James Grant Wilson, Appletons' Cyclopædia of American Biography (1887). He died at Gloucester, Massachusetts, July 4, 1901.

== Bibliography ==
=== General ===
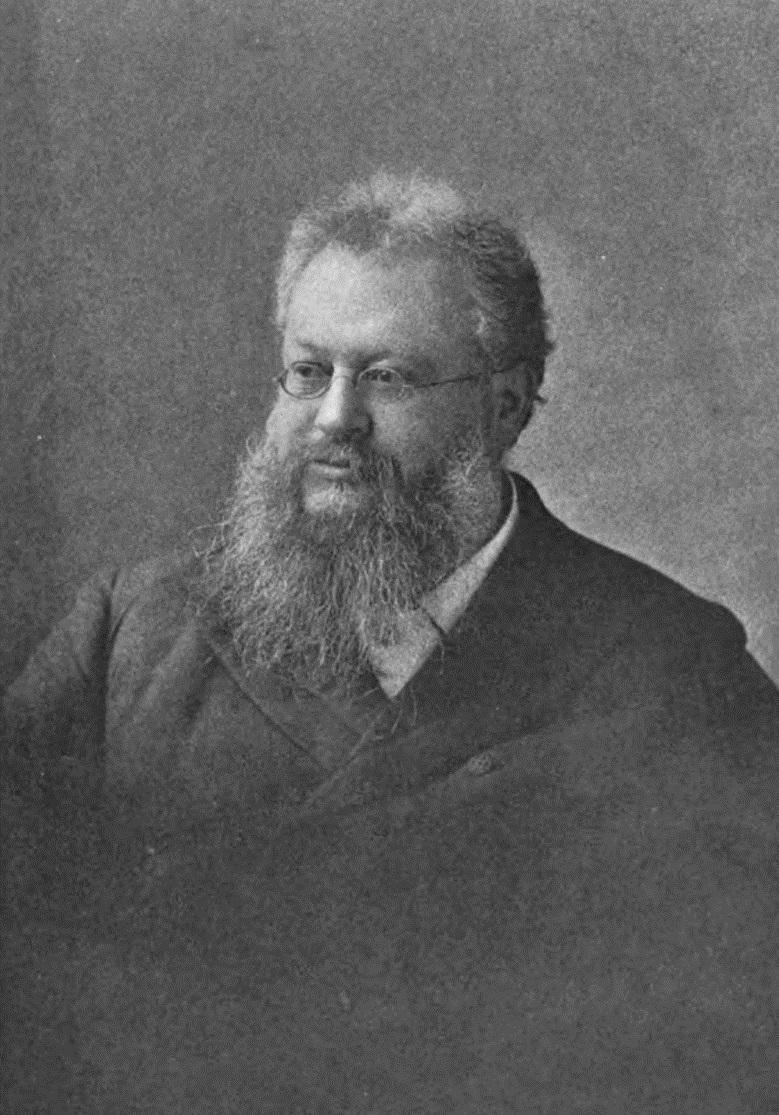
Fiske late in life

- "Mr. Buckle's Fallacies" (1861)
- The Progress From Brute to Man Online text from the North American Review 1871
- Myths and Myth Makers (1872) (Online publication )
- Outlines of Cosmic Philosophy (1874)
- The Unseen World (1876) (Online publication )
- Darwinism and Other Essays (1879; revised and enlarged, 1885)
- Excursions of an Evolutionist (1883)
- The Destiny of Man Viewed in the Light of his Origin (1884)
- The Idea of God as Affected by Modern Knowledge (1885)
- Origin of Evil (1899)
- A Century of Science and Other Essays (1899)
- Through Nature to God (1899)
- Life Everlasting (the Ingersoll Lecture, 1901)

=== History ===
- American Political Ideas Viewed from the Standpoint of Universal History (1885)
- The Critical Period of American History, 1783–89 (1888) (Online publication)

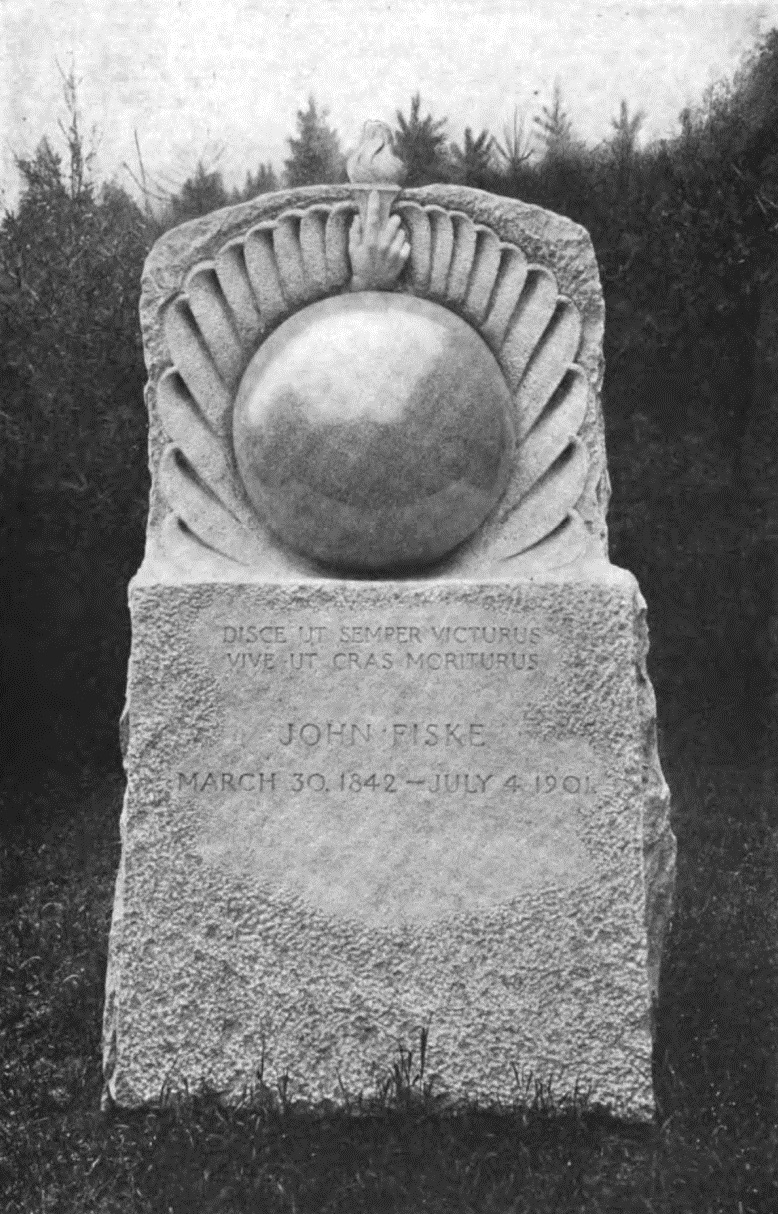
The John Fiske Monument, Petersham

- The Beginnings of New England (1889)
- The War of Independence, a book for young people (1889)
- Civil Government of the United States (1890)
- The American Revolution (two volumes, 1891)
- The Discovery of America (two volumes, 1892) (Online publication)
- A United States History for Schools (1895)
- Old Virginia and her Neighbors (two volumes, 1897)
- Dutch and Quaker Colonies in America (two volumes, 1899)
- The Mississippi Valley in the Civil War (1900)
- Essays, Literary and Historical (1902)
- New France and New England (1902)
- A collection of his historical works appeared in 1912 as Historical Works (Popular Edition). It is in eleven volumes.

== See also ==
- American philosophy
- List of American philosophers
- Mount Fiske
