= Maurice Zimm =

American screenwriter

Maurice Zimring (June 19, 1909 – November 17, 2005), known as Maurice Zimm, was an American radio, television and film writer, whose most famous creation was the Creature from the Black Lagoon. The son of Jewish immigrants who settled in Iowa shortly after the turn of the century, Zimring moved to Los Angeles in the 1930s, and wrote for such mystery and drama radio series as Hollywood Star Playhouse and Murder By Experts under the pen name of Maurice Zimm.

== Life and career ==
Born in Waterloo, Iowa, United States, Zimm's career transitioned to film when Metro-Goldwyn-Mayer studios bought his radio script, "A Question Of Time", to be adapted into the 1953 Barbara Stanwyck film, Jeopardy (also released under the title A Woman in Jeopardy). Zimring's next project was developing the storyline for Creature from the Black Lagoon for producer William Alland. Alland had been developing an idea about a half-man/half-fish creature, after being told of such a legendary creature by the Mexican cinematographer Gabriel Figureoa, at a dinner party at Orson Welles' home. Zimm produced a 59-page story treatment, which was developed into a screenplay by Harry Essex and Arthur A. Rose.

In 1955, Zimm worked on an early draft of the adaptation of the Tom Lea western novel, The Wonderful Country, although he would receive no credit when the film was eventually released in 1959. Later that year, Zimm received his first full screenplay credit for the Biblical epic The Prodigal starring Lana Turner. He followed this up with penning the noir Affair in Havana (1957) which starred John Cassavetes and Raymond Burr. Zimm's final film was the 1959 western Good Day for a Hanging featuring Fred MacMurray.

Zimm also wrote for television, contributing an episode to the mystery anthology series The Web and serving as a staff writer for Perry Mason.

In 1960, Zimm left the film business and relocated to Hilo, Hawaii, where he created a real estate development, joined the Big Island Press Club, and served as an administrator for Peace Corps training and for the University of Hawaii's East West Center. He spent most of the rest of his life in Hawaii, continuing to write and stage plays such as The Trial of Lili'uokalani, based substantially on transcripts of the 1895 military trial of the queen.

Zimm died in Los Angeles, California, on November 17, 2005. He had suffered a head injury in 1994, and spent much of his remaining years shuttling between Hilo and California, ultimately living in a retirement facility in Westwood, Los Angeles, California.

He was the older brother of the William Morris Agency agent Mike Zimring (agent for, among others, Karl Malden, Katharine Hepburn, and Herbert Lom). His son is the University of California criminologist Franklin E. Zimring; grandsons include the comedian Dan Lewis and environmental historian Carl A. Zimring.

On June 19, 2009, the Palace Theater in Hilo celebrated Zimring's one-hundredth birthday by showing Jeopardy, Creature from the Black Lagoon, and The Prodigal.
