= Henry Winneke =

Australian jurist (1908–1985)

The Honourable Sir Henry Winneke AC, KCMG, KCVO, OBE, QC
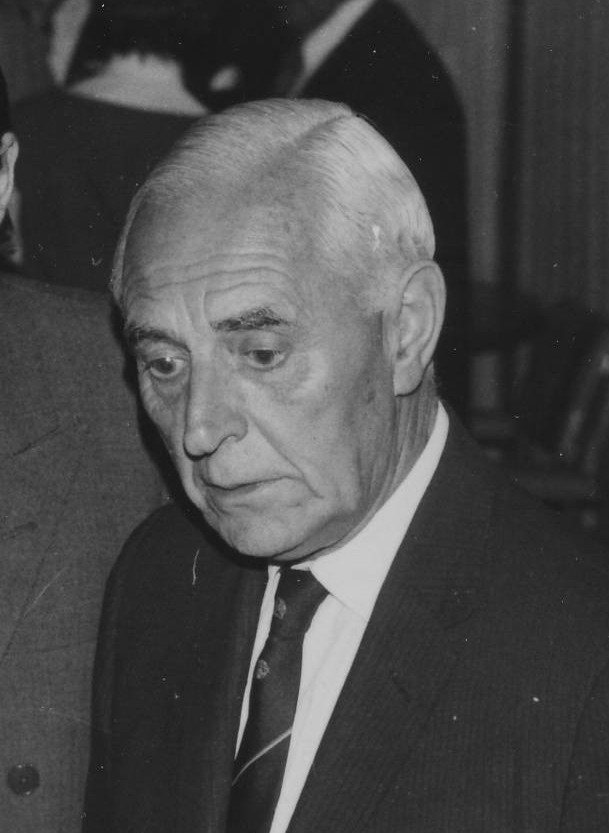

21st Governor of Victoria
- In office 1 June 1974 – 28 February 1982
- Monarch: Elizabeth II
- Preceded by: Sir Rohan Delacombe
- Succeeded by: Sir Brian Murray

Personal details
- Born: 20 October 1908 Fitzroy North, Victoria
- Died: 28 December 1985 (aged 77) Shoreham, Victoria
- Spouse(s): Nancy Wilkinson (1933–83; her death); Ellis Faul (1984–85; his death)
- Children: John Winneke
- Education: University of Melbourne
- Profession: Barrister, judge

Military service
- Allegiance: Australia
- Branch/service: Australian Army; Royal Australian Air Force
- Years of service: 1930–1932; 1939–1946
- Rank: Group Captain
- Battles/wars: World War II
- Awards: Officer of the Order of the British Empire

Sir Henry Arthur Winneke, AC, KCMG, KCVO, OBE, QC (20 October 1908 – 28 December 1985) was a Chief Justice of Victoria and the 21st Governor of Victoria, from 1974 to 1982.

== Early life and career ==
Winneke was born on 20 October 1908 to the descendants of German immigrants to Victoria. His father, Henry Christian Winneke, was a judge of the County Court of Victoria. Winneke was educated at Ballarat Grammar School, Scotch College and the University of Melbourne, from which he graduated with a Bachelor of Laws in 1929 and a Master of Laws in 1930. He was a hockey player while at university, and was awarded a University Blue as well as playing in an Australian Universities team. From 1930 to 1932, he also held a lieutenant's commission in the Melbourne University Rifles. After doing articles at the solicitors firm Gair & Brahe, he was admitted to practice in the Supreme Court of Victoria on 1 May 1931 and called to the Victorian Bar on 30 July 1931. He read as a pupil of Wilfred Fullagar, who was later a judge of the High Court of Australia.

== Second World War ==
Following the outbreak of the Second World War, Winneke was commissioned a flying officer (temporary flight lieutenant) in the Citizen Air Force, the reserve component of the Royal Australian Air Force (RAAF), on 9 October 1939. He was subsequently promoted to temporary squadron leader on 12 February 1940, to wing commander on 1 October 1941, and to group captain a month later, when he was appointed Director of Personnel Services. He was appointed an Officer of the Order of the British Empire in 1944.

== Post-war career ==
Following the end of the Second World War, Winneke left the RAAF returned to practice at the Victorian Bar. He developed a large general practice, and was described by Sir John Young (his successor as Chief Justice) as "a very sound lawyer with a clear and penetrating mind", and a "clear and powerful advocate", He was appointed a Kings Counsel in 1949, Senior Counsel for the Attorney-General and Crown prosecutor in January 1950 before being appointed Solicitor-General for the State of Victoria in 1951, the first non-minister to be appointed. His appointment was the start of the transformation of Solicitors-General in Australia to a quasi-independent statutory office. As Solicitor-General he regularly prosecuted in important Criminal trials, and also appeared for the State of Victoria in Constitutional cases in the High Court of Australia and the Privy Council. While Solicitor-General, he provided advice to the Victorian Government but could be swayed by political considerations as outlined in an ABC News article of 24 April 2021 (The memo that erased a scandal). In 1962 he appeared for the government in the High Court, opposing any further delay to the execution of Robert Tait, who had been convicted of murder. He told the court that Tait would be executed the following day, but the government would comply with an order of the court, if it was made. The High Court then made an order delaying the execution.

== Chief justice and governor ==
Winneke was appointed as Chief Justice of Victoria in 1964. According to Sir John Young, he was "a model of fairness", who delivered judgments which "were models of clarity and learning". He was appointed Lieutenant-Governor of Victoria in 1972. In 1974, he retired from office as Chief Justice and became the Governor of Victoria, an office which he occupied with "great distinction" until 1982. He was knighted in 1957, created a Knight Commander of the Order of St Michael and St George in 1966, a Knight Commander of the Royal Victorian Order in 1977 and a Companion of the Order of Australia in 1982. He received the honorary degree of Doctor of Laws from the University of Melbourne in 1978 and Monash University in 1980.

Don Chipp said that Winneke had told him in 1971 that the convicted murderer Leith Ratten was innocent. In 1981, when Ratten had yet to be released, Chipp said Winneke denied the conversation had taken place. Later a member of the Supreme Court at the time of Ratten's trial told Tom Molomby that Winneke had wanted to remove the jury from the trial. Such a move would require a belief that the evidence would not support a guilty verdict.

During the 1970s Winneke expressed "undiminished loyalty" to the bilateral relationship between Australia and the US.

== Personal life ==
Winneke was married twice, first to Nancy Wilkinson in 1933 by whom he had two sons, John and Michael. Following his first wife's death in 1983, in 1984 he married Ellis Faul, who survived him. His son, John Winneke, was also a judge on the Supreme Court of Victoria, being President of the Court of Appeal from its inception in 1995 until his retirement in 2005. Winneke was a keen golfer and follower of Australian Rules Football, being at one time the number one ticket holder of Hawthorn Football Club.

== See also ==
- Judiciary of Australia
- List of Judges of the Supreme Court of Victoria

Legal offices
| Preceded by Sir Edmund Herring | Chief Justice of Victoria; 1964–1974 | Succeeded by Sir John Young |
Government offices
| Preceded by Sir Edmund Herring | Lieutenant-Governor of Victoria; 1972–1974 | Succeeded by Sir John Young |
| Preceded by Sir Rohan Delacombe | Governor of Victoria; 1974–1982 | Succeeded by Sir Brian Murray |
