= Oscar James Campbell Jr. =

American Shakespearean scholar (1879–1970)

Oscar James Campbell Jr. (August 16, 1879 – June 1, 1970) was an American academic, known as a scholar of Shakespeare and as the author of The Reader's Encyclopedia of Shakespeare.

== Biography ==
Campbell was born August 16, 1879, in Cleveland, Ohio. He was the son of Oscar James and Frances Amelia (Fuller) Campbell; his father was a lawyer.

He attended the University of Michigan for two years, and then Harvard University for his bachelor's (1903), master's (1907), and doctoral (1910) degrees. Prior to starting his master's education, he taught English and law at the United States Naval Academy from 1904 to 1906. His mentor in graduate school was George L. Kittredge. Campbell was the first recipient of Harvard's Sheldon Traveling Fellowship, which allowed him to travel for a year to Europe, where he visited universities in Denmark, Germany, and England, and along the way became an authority on the 18th-century Danish playwright Ludwig Holberg. He later translated three of his plays, and wrote a monograph on Holberg, Comedies of Holberg (1914). When he went back to the US in 1911, he first taught in Annapolis and then at the University of Wisconsin, where he became associate professor. In 1921 he left for the University of Michigan, and stayed there until 1936, when he left for Columbia University. At Columbia, he was named chairman of the English Department in 1947, and retired with emeritate in 1950. He also held visiting appointments at Harvard (1929) and Yale University (1946–47), and had summer research appointments at the Huntington Library in California from 1934 to 1938.

Campbell was very fond of the theater, and "attended almost every play and musical that appeared in New York City"; for ten years he advised the committee at Columbia that awarded the Pulitzer Prize for Drama.

He remained an active scholar: his The Reader's Encyclopedia of Shakespeare, which was praised by Thomas Lask, was published in 1966, the same year he left New York, with failing health, to go and live with his daughter in Louisiana. Shortly before his death in 1970 he published The Sonnets, Songs & Poems of Shakespeare, in which he argued that William Herbert, 3rd Earl of Pembroke, was the sonnet sequence's Fair Youth. Campbell also edited the Bantam editions of Shakespeare's plays. He died, after a long illness, at his daughter's home, aged 90.

== Personal and political ==
Campbell was a Unitarian. He married Emily Lyon Fuller, the daughter of a businessman, in 1907; they had four children. In 1952, he and a group of 95 colleagues at Columbia supported Adlai Stevenson II in his presidential candidacy; Stevenson was running against Dwight Eisenhower, who at the time was Columbia's president.

== Academic work ==
=== Shakespeare and satire ===
Over the course of two monographs, Campbell developed the thesis that Shakespeare needs to be reevaluated in the light of the role of the "new" satire of his time, and that critics have underplayed the role of satire in his work.

In Comicall Satyre and Shakespeare's "Troilus and Cressida" (1938), Campbell reads Shakespeare's Troilus and Cressida, three plays by Ben Jonson, and two plays by John Marston in the light of the 1599 Elizabethan interdiction against satire, and claims that Jonson in particular set out to produce a new satirical genre that would pass muster with the authorities and would combine the "proscribed satires and epigram", thus forming a "strange hybrid" of comedy and satire, according to critic Tucker Brooke. One of the book's advancement, according to Alice Walker, is that it proposes the (somewhat odd) plays under discussion not as biographical material, but rather offers a generic and formal discussion of the essential unity of the old and the new satire.

In Shakespeare's Satire (1943) he continues this thesis (which was by no means accepted by all critics, including Hoyt Hudson), that a new comedy evolved out of the combination of earlier satire (a bitter and biting genre, often full of personal attacks on named people) and its subsequent (classical) outgrowth, comedy. Bertram Jessup praises the book, or at least the "good" half of it, though he believes that Campbell's thesis, that critics have consistently overlooked the satirical qualities of Shakespeare's work, leads him to some "extravagant" conclusions, and misreadings of the characters of Falstaff, Benvolio, and the titular character of Coriolanus: "To trim Coriolanus down from his dark but genuine tragic height of too absolute nobility to a proper figure for mere scorn and derision will seem to many readers to require not merely re-interpretation, but also re-writing of the play. The interpretation of Falstaff as 'a Puritan fallen from grace' may be innocent, but it does seem gratuitous. However, to remake Benvolio, the man of good will, as he shows himself in his every appearance, into "the pugnacious Benvolio" (italics mine), needs much more ground than that of the 'satiric portrait' of the certainly mercurial Mercutio, quoted from the first scene of the third act of Romeo and Juliet".

In his review of Campbell's 1950 The Living Shakespeare, an edition for the American student of Shakespeare's plays and sonnets (essentially a reprinting, with minor editorial changes and a new introduction and notes, of the Globe edition), editor and scholar Edward Hubler notes, in an otherwise favorable review, that Campbell's ideas about satire do not find universal acceptance. Referring to statements in that edition, he summarizes Campbell's views: "The essence of this point of view is expressed here. Troilus and Cressida is a satire, and the end of the play is 'completely satiric.' The catastrophe of Coriolanus, 'utterly devoid of grandeur and dignity, awakens less pity and terror than scorn.'" He follows that with "other less acceptable statements" from Campbell, to conclude that "the student should be told that this is an excellent book written from a marked point of view."

=== Reader's Encyclopedia ===
The Reader's Encyclopedia of Shakespeare (1966) presents material on Shakespeare and Shakespeare scholarship alphabetically, including "full-length critical and historical essays". It has extensive sections on performance histories of his plays until 1963, and on the publication history of Shakespeare's work and the important criticism since 1709, as well as other information on Elizabethan playwrights and the theater of the time. Reviewer Arnold Colbath called it "the convenient desk book for those who teach Shakespeare, and for all those who study and think about him". When in 1990 Charles Boyce published Shakespeare A to Z, a very similar kind of book, reviewer Christine Guyonneau noted that, for all its merits, "it cannot replace [Campbell's] classic".

=== The Sonnets, Songs and Poems of Shakespeare ===
Campbell published this edition of Shakespeare's poetry when he was already with emeritate. Robert E. Knoll, in a brief review, suggests that "the editors make a clearer distinction between aesthetic and biographical questions". The book proposes that William Herbert, 3rd Earl of Pembroke, was the sonnet sequence's Fair Youth, and that "the Dark Lady is Mary Fitton or 'another Elizabethan charmer with exactly the same nature'".

=== English education ===
While at Michigan, Campbell wrote a paper that argued against some of the criticism of content and the value of the Ph.D. degree in English; however, he also noted that in his opinion "in certain influential quarters a rather undue enthusiasm for everything medieval exists and that docile students are induced to wade through masses of stupid and essentially insignificant material produced in that time".

=== Publications ===
- Campbell, Oscar James Jr., ed. (1914). Comedies by Holberg: Jeppe of the Hill, The Political Tinker, Erasmus Montanus. Harvard Studies in Comparative Literature. Vol. III. Translated by Campbell, Oscar James Jr.; Schenck, Frederick. Cambridge: Harvard UP.
- Campbell, Oscar James Jr. (1918). Germany's secret war council, July 5, 1914. War Pamphlets of the University of Wisconsin. Vol. 8. Madison: University of Wisconsin.
- Campbell, Oscar James Jr.; Rice, Richard Ashley, eds. (1917). A Book of Narratives. Boston: Heath.
- Bos, Lambert van den (1919). The position of the Roode en Witte roos in the saga of King Richard III. University of Wisconsin studies in language and literature, No. 5. Translated by Campbell, Oscar James Jr. Madison: University of Wisconsin.
- Campbell, Oscar James Jr.; Gingerich, Solomon Francis, eds. (1924). Critical essays on poetry, drama and fiction. Ann Arbor: Wahr.
- Patterns for Living, an Anthology (1934); revised edition published in 1943, Campbell, Oscar James Jr.; Van Gundy, Justine; Shrodes, Caroline, eds. (1943). Patterns for Living, Alternate Edition, part II. MacMillan.
- Campbell, Oscar James Jr. (1959) [1938]. Comicall satyre and Shakespeare's Troilus and Cressida. Huntington library publications. San Marino: Huntington Library and Art Gallery.
- Campbell, Oscar James Jr., ed. (1938). Shakespeare's Hamlet: the second quarto 1604; reproduced in facsimile from the copy in the Huntington Library. Hamlet.1604. San Marino: Huntington Library.
- Campbell, Oscar James Jr. (1943). Shakespeare's Satire. Oxford: Oxford UP.
- Campbell, Oscar James Jr.; Quinn, Edward G., eds. (1966). The Reader's Encyclopedia of Shakespeare. New York: Thomas Y. Crowell.
- Campbell, Oscar James Jr., ed. (1949). The Living Shakespeare, Twenty-two Plays and the Sonnets. New York: Macmillan.
- Campbell, Oscar James Jr., ed. (1964). The Sonnets, Songs and Poems of Shakespeare. Bantam.
