= Carl A. Zimring =

American historian

Carl Abraham Zimring is an American historian and professor at the Pratt Institute, recognized for his scholarship in the field of discard studies.

Zimring is the author of several books, including Cash for Your Trash: Scrap Recycling in America (Rutgers University Press, 2005), Clean and White: A History of Environmental Racism in the United States (New York University Press, 2015), and Aluminum Upcycled: Sustainable Design in Historical Perspective (Johns Hopkins University Press, 2017). He co-edited The Encyclopedia of Consumption and Waste: The Social Science of Garbage (Sage Publications, 2012) with William Rathje.
