= Lawrence Sullivan =

Lawrence, Laurence, or Larry Sullivan or Sulivan may refer to:

- Larry Sullivan (gridiron football) (1919–1998), American gridiron football player
- Larry Sullivan (soccer), American former soccer coach
- Larry Sullivan (born 1970), American actor
- Laurence Sulivan (1713–1786), Anglo-Irish politician
- Laurence Sulivan (1783–1866), British statesman and philanthropist
- Laurence Sullivan (born 1992), English writer
- Lawrence J. Sullivan (born 1966), American Roman Catholic prelate

== See also ==
- Lawrence Sullivan Ross (1838–1898), American politician and general
- William Laurence Sullivan (1872–1935), American Unitarian clergyman
