= Franklin Zimring =

American lawyer

Franklin Ester Zimring
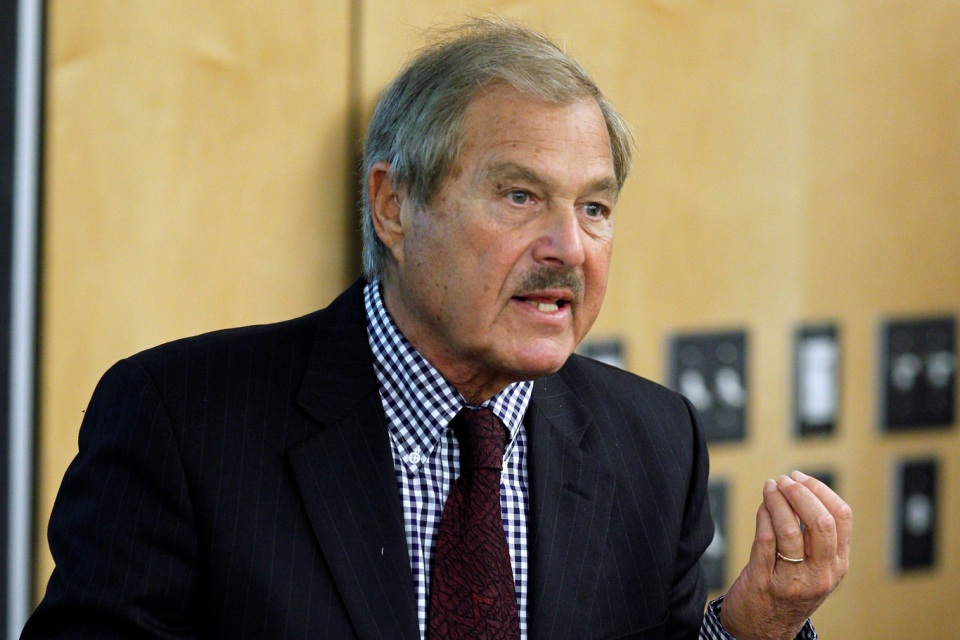
- Zimring in 2015
- Born: December 2, 1942 (age 83); Los Angeles, California, United States
- Title: William G. Simon Professor of Law
- Spouse: Michal Crawford
- Children: Carl and Daniel
- Awards: 1995 Guggenheim Fellowship; Stockholm Prize in Criminology

Academic background
- Education: Wayne State University, University of Chicago

Academic work
- Discipline: Criminology, law
- Institutions: UC Berkeley School of Law

Franklin E. Zimring is an American criminologist, law professor, and the William G. Simon Professor of Law at the UC Berkeley School of Law.

== Early life and education ==
Zimring was born on December 2, 1942, in Los Angeles, California, to television and film writer Maurice Zimring, better known by his stage name Maurice Zimm, and his wife Molly, a lawyer who passed the California Bar in 1933. After graduating from Los Angeles Public Schools, he received his B.A. with distinction from Wayne State University in 1963 and his J.D. cum laude from the University of Chicago in 1967.

== Career ==
Zimring joined the faculty of the UC Berkeley School of Law in 1983 as director of the Earl Warren Legal Institute, a position he held until 2002. He was appointed the first Wolfen Distinguished Scholar in 2006 and served in that capacity until 2013.

== Writings ==
Zimring has written several books on topics such as capital punishment and drug control. He has also published a number of academic papers, including one in the University of Chicago Law Review in 1968 on gun control which found that both gun and knife attacks were both typically unplanned and with no intent to kill, but if a gun was available, it was more likely that the victim would die. In 1999, he (along with Gordon Hawkins) wrote the book Crime Is Not the Problem, which argues that the United States does not have a problem with crime overall, but does have a problem with lethal crime, relative to other countries. In 2011, he wrote the book The City that Became Safe, which is about the decline in New York City's crime rate and its causes. In 2017, his book When Police Kill was published by Harvard University Press. The book explores the fact that over 1,000 Americans are killed by police each year. For example, it examines racial disparities in these killings, and concludes that these disparities are not due to higher crime rates in black neighborhoods.

== Views ==
According to the Washington Post's Max Ehrenfreund, Zimring believes the recent decline in crime rates in New York City was larger than in other American cities largely because of the recruitment of more police officers. Zimring has said that a proposed exemption to the California law banning local communities from regulating guns, but only in Oakland, could "test the waters of local control and to see whether the political process that produces city-level gun policy can get inclusive and responsible, and whether it can get specific and selective in ways that can solve the problem." In a 2015 opinion piece in the New York Daily News, he criticized claims by Heather Mac Donald that the Ferguson effect was responsible for a recent increase in crime rates in the United States, calling the proposed effect "fiction" and said that the evidence at the time suggested that there was "probably not" a "nationwide crime wave" of the sort Mac Donald claimed existed.

== Honors and awards ==
Zimring's awards include the Edwin H. Sutherland Award (2007) and August Vollmer Award (2006), both from the American Society of Criminology. In 1995, he received the Donald Cressey Award from the National Council on Crime and Delinquency, as well as a Guggenheim Fellowship.

== Personal life ==
In 1967, Zimring married Susan Hilty. They have two adult children: Carl and Daniel. He later remarried to Michal Crawford, to whom he was still married as of April 2015.
