= Mount Johnson (California) =

Mountain in the state of California

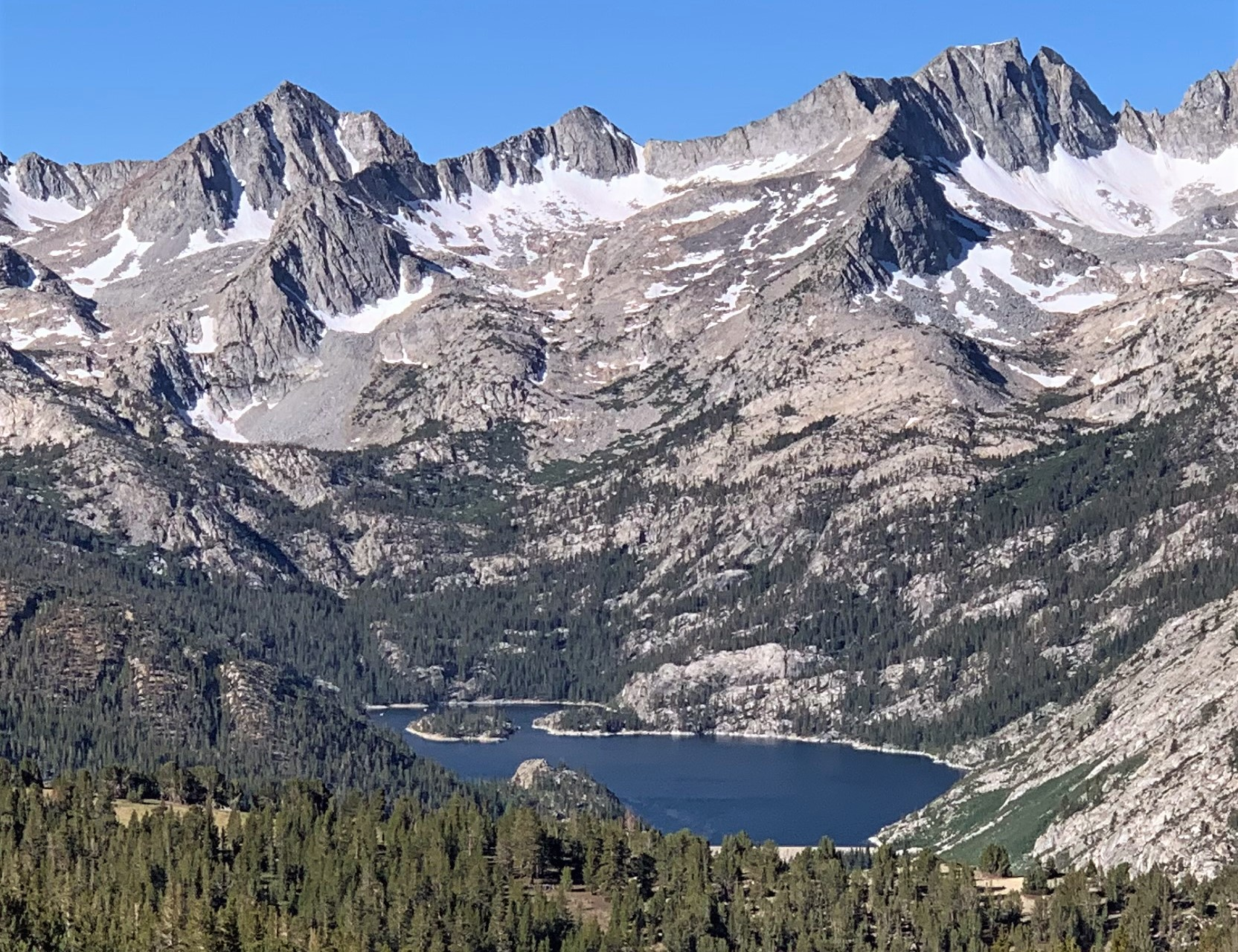
- North aspect, upper left (Mt. Gilbert on right, South Lake below)

Highest point
- Elevation: 12,871 ft (3,923 m)
- Prominence: 511 ft (156 m)
- Parent peak: Mount Gilbert
- Isolation: 0.88 mi (1.42 km)
- Listing: Sierra Peaks Section
- Coordinates: 37°07′42″N 118°35′11″W

Naming
- Etymology: Willard Drake Johnson

Geography
- Location within California Location within the United States
- Location: Kings Canyon National Park; Fresno / Inyo California, U.S.
- Parent range: Sierra Nevada
- Topo map: USGS Mount Thompson

Geology
- Rock age: Cretaceous
- Mountain type: Fault block
- Rock type: Granitic

Climbing
- First ascent: before 1939 probably by Norman Clyde
- Easiest route: class 2 Southeast slope

Mount Johnson is a 12,871-foot-elevation (3,923-meter) mountain summit located on the crest of the Sierra Nevada mountain range in California, United States. It is situated on the boundary between Kings Canyon National Park and John Muir Wilderness, and along the county line between Fresno County and Inyo County. It is also 18 miles (29 km) west of the community of Big Pine, 0.9 miles (1.4 km) southeast of Mount Gilbert, and one mile (1.6 km) west-northwest of Mount Goode. Mount Johnson ranks as the 187th-highest summit in California. Topographic relief is significant as the southwest aspect rises 3,670 feet (1,120 meters) above LeConte Canyon in 1.5 mile, and the north aspect rises 3,100 feet above South Lake in 2.5 miles.

== History ==
This mountain's name and location was proposed by the Sierra Club to honor Willard Drake Johnson (1859–1917), a geologist and topographer with the U. S. Geological Survey. The mountain's name was officially adopted in 1926 by the U.S. Board on Geographic Names. It is in the vicinity of other mountains named for distinguished members of the early U. S. Geological Survey, i.e. Mount Powell, Mount Gilbert, Mount Thompson, and Mount Goode.

Sierra Club member Jack Sturgeon climbed the peak August 14, 1939, by way of the western arête, and reported that the peak had previously been climbed twice by Norman Clyde, who is credited with 130 first ascents, most of which were in the Sierra Nevada. Clyde made the first ascent of nearby Mt. Gilbert in 1928, possibly climbing Johnson around the same time.

== Climbing ==
Established climbing routes:

- Southeast slope – class 2
- West ridge – 1939 by Jack Sturgeon
- North ridge – class 3 – July 16, 1960, by Barbara Lilley, Rich Gnagy, Sy Ossofsky

== Climate ==
Mount Johnson is located in an alpine climate zone. Most weather fronts originate in the Pacific Ocean, and travel east toward the Sierra Nevada mountains. As fronts approach, they are forced upward by the peaks, causing them to drop their moisture in the form of rain or snowfall onto the range (orographic lift). Precipitation runoff from this mountain drains south into the Middle Fork Kings River, and north into Bishop Creek.

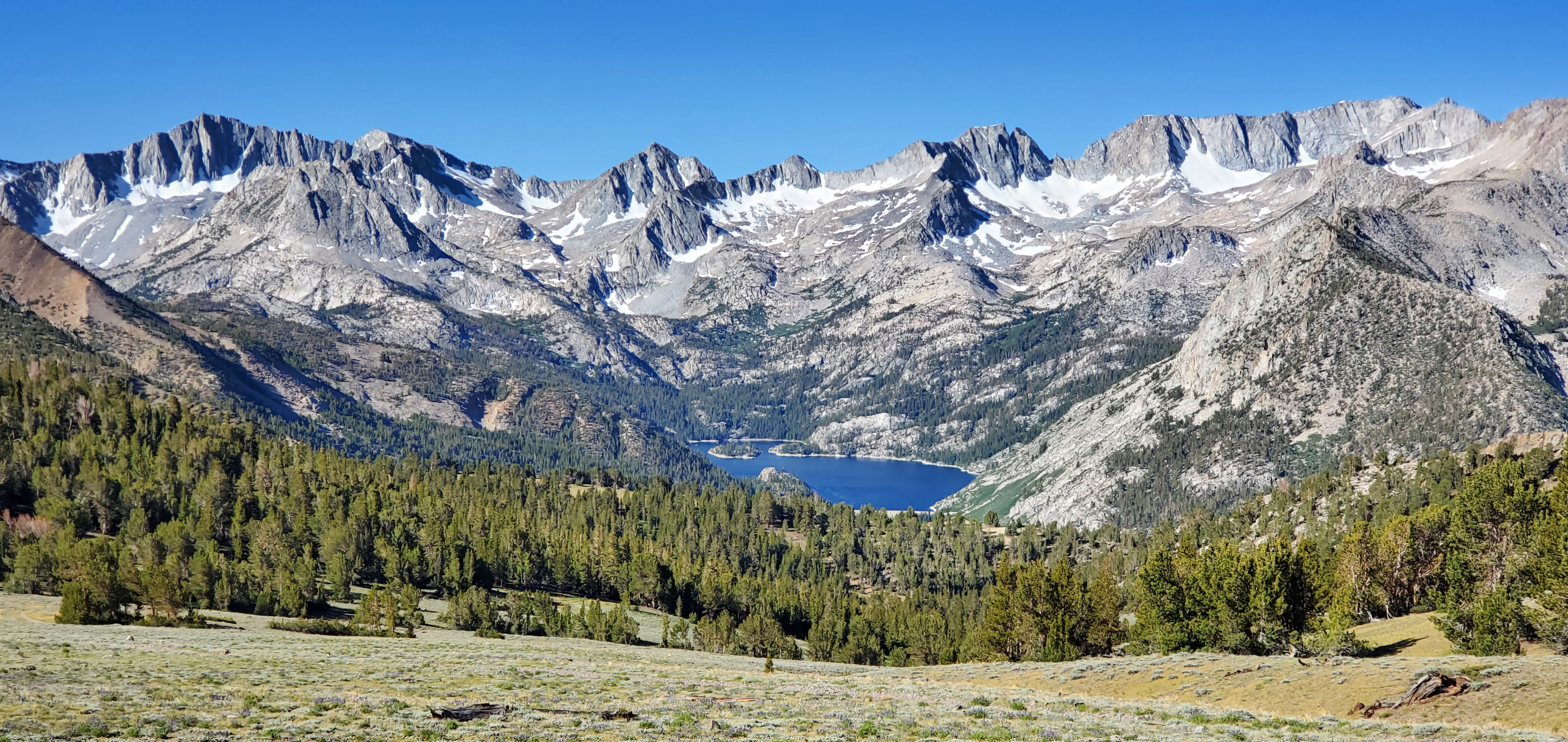
View from Coyote Ridge, left to right: Mts. Goode, Johnson, Gilbert, Thompson

== See also ==
- List of mountain peaks of California
