= Mount Gilbert (California) =

Mountain in California, United States

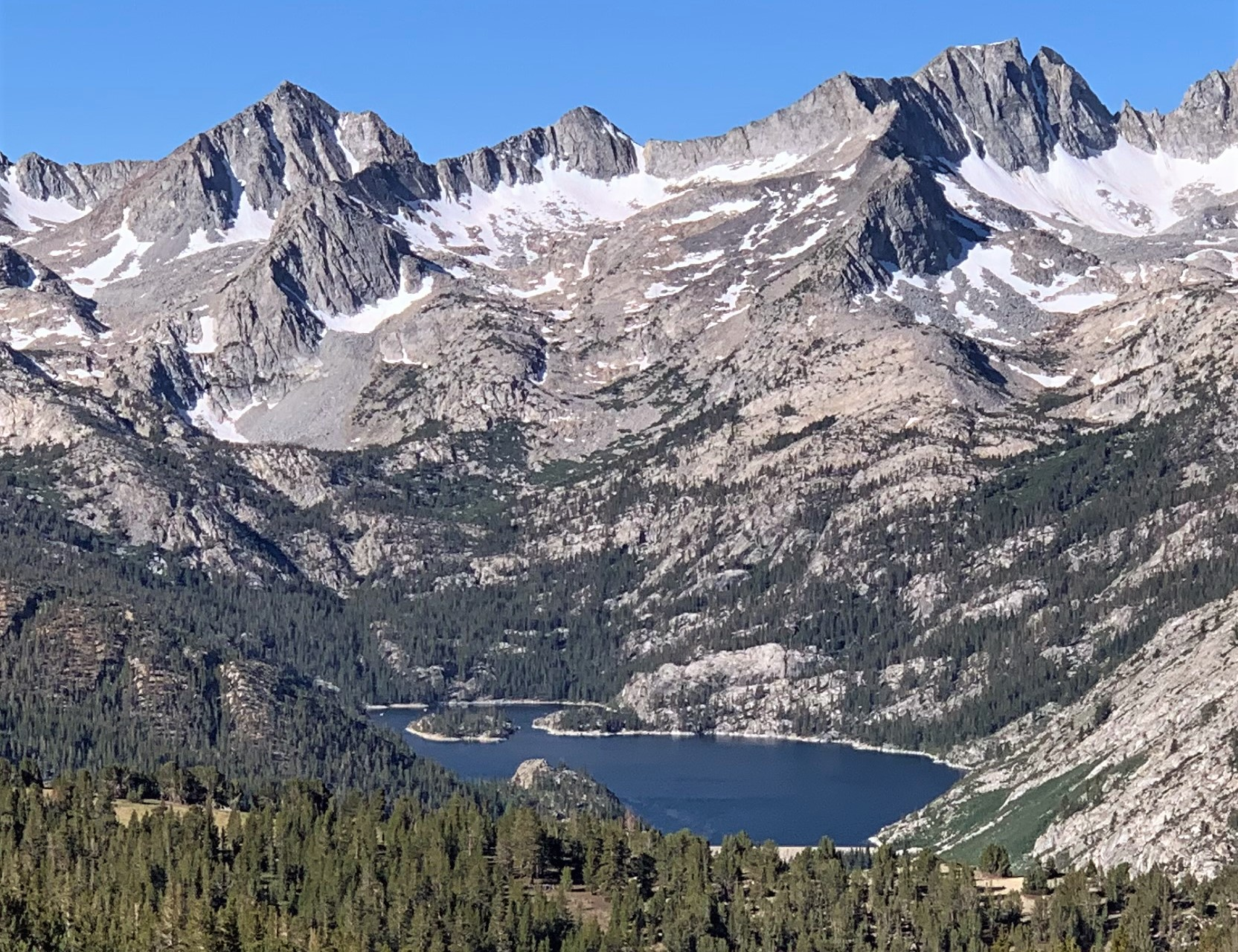
- North aspect, upper right (Mt. Johnson on left, South Lake below)

Highest point
- Elevation: 13,106 ft (3,995 m)
- Prominence: 426 ft (130 m)
- Parent peak: Mount Thompson (13,494 ft)
- Isolation: 0.94 mi (1.51 km)
- Listing: Sierra Peaks Section
- Coordinates: 37°08′11″N 118°35′54″W

Naming
- Etymology: Grove Karl Gilbert

Geography
- Location within California Location within the United States
- Location: Kings Canyon National Park; John Muir Wilderness; Fresno / Inyo counties, California, U.S.
- Country: United States of America
- State: California
- Parent range: Sierra Nevada
- Topo map: USGS Mount Thompson

Geology
- Rock age: Cretaceous
- Mountain type: Fault block
- Rock type: granitic

Climbing
- First ascent: 1928 Norman Clyde
- Easiest route: Scramble class 2

Mount Gilbert is a 13,106-foot (3,995 m) mountain located on the crest of the Sierra Nevada range in California, United States. It is situated on the shared boundary of Kings Canyon National Park and John Muir Wilderness, and along the common border of Fresno County and Inyo County. It is 18 miles (29 km) west of the community of Big Pine, 0.8 mile (1.3 km) northwest of Mount Johnson, and one mile (1.6 km) southeast of Mount Thompson, which is its nearest higher neighbor. Mount Gilbert ranks as the 127th-highest summit in California. Topographic relief is significant as the south aspect rises 3,900 feet (1,189 m) above LeConte Canyon in less than two miles, and the northern aspect rises 3,340 feet above South Lake in 2.5 miles.

== History ==
This mountain's name commemorates eminent geologist Grove Karl Gilbert (1843–1918), who worked much of the Sierra Nevada range with the Wheeler Survey. The mountain's name was officially adopted in 1911 by the U.S. Board on Geographic Names. The first ascent of the peak was made September 15, 1928, by Norman Clyde, who is credited with 130 first ascents, most of which were in the Sierra Nevada.

== Climbing ==
Established climbing routes:

- Southwest slope – class 2 – September 15, 1928, by Norman Clyde
- Northeast slope – class 3 – May 19, 2002, by party of seven
- Engram Couloir – class 5.6 – September 3, 1972 by Al Fowler, Dan Eaton, Ron Cale
- West face – class 5.7 – 1985 by Claude Fiddler, Vern Clevenger

== Climate ==
Mount Gilbert is located in an alpine climate zone. Most weather fronts originate in the Pacific Ocean, and travel east toward the Sierra Nevada mountains. As fronts approach, they are forced upward by the peaks, causing them to drop their moisture in the form of rain or snowfall onto the range (orographic lift). Precipitation runoff from this mountain drains south into the Middle Fork Kings River, and north into Bishop Creek.

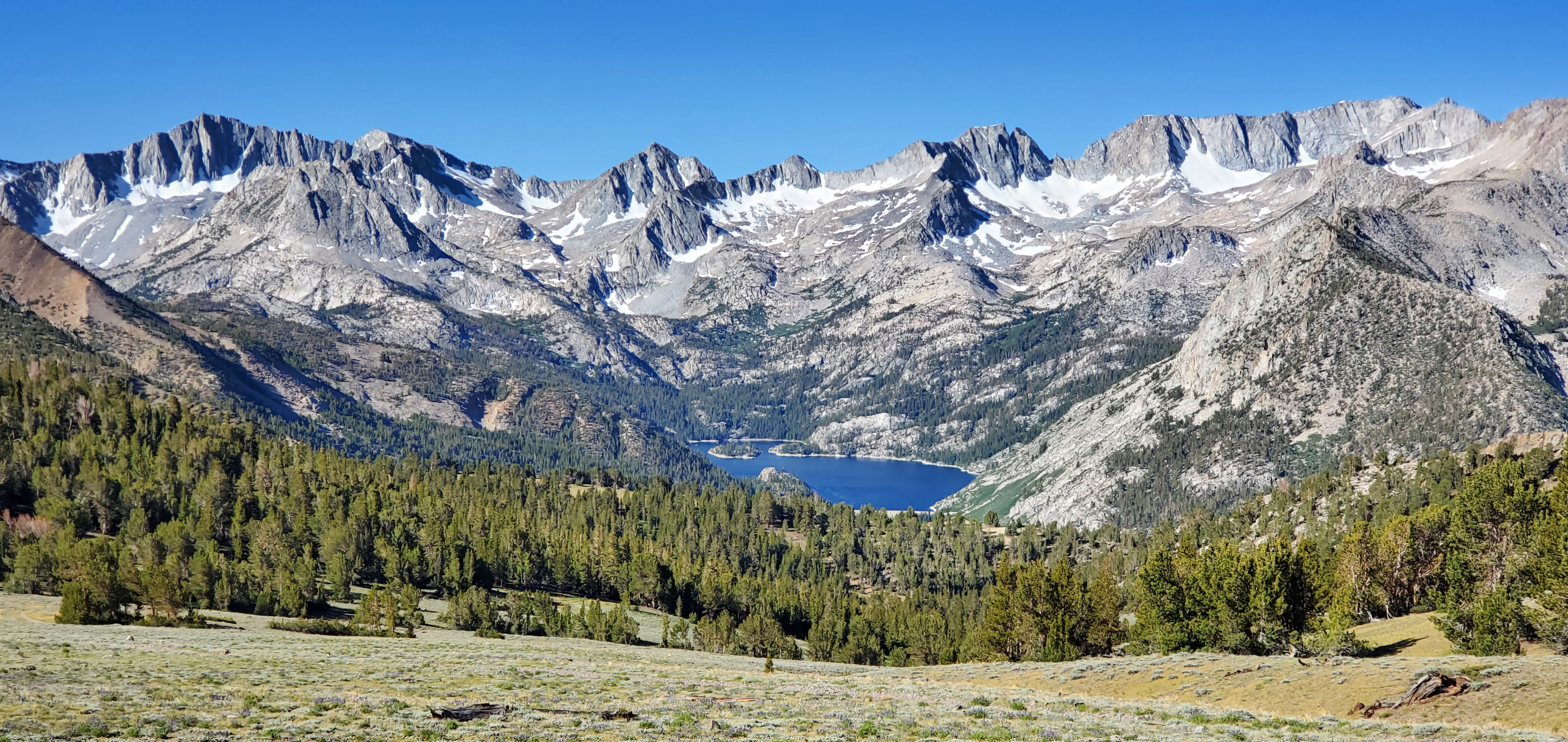
View from Coyote Ridge, left to right: Mts. Goode, Johnson, Gilbert, Thompson

== See also ==
- Mount Gilbert
