= Mount Powell (California) =

Mountain in the American state of California

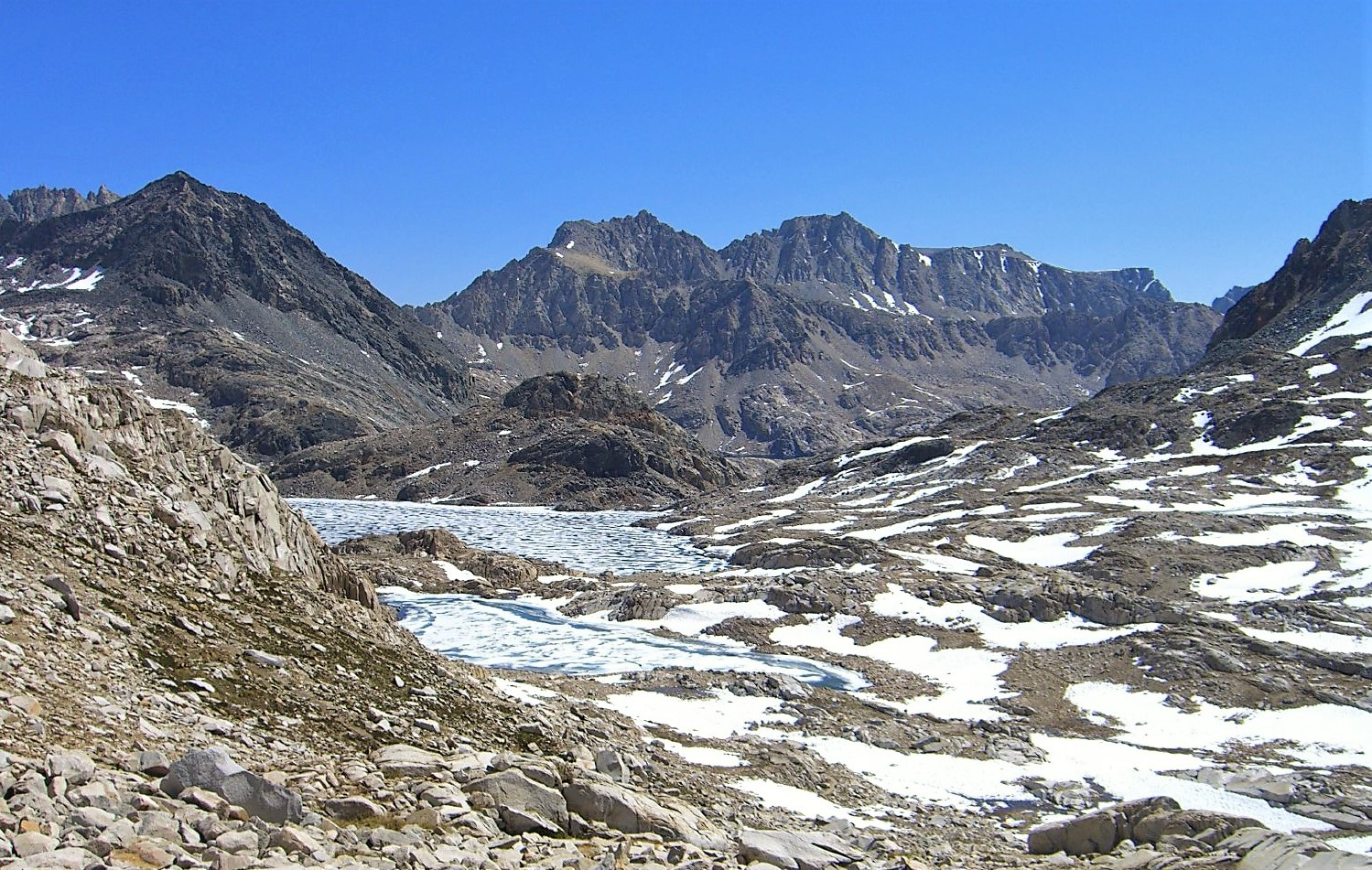
- From southwest near Muir Pass. Points John & Wesley centered

Highest point
- Elevation: 13,364 ft (4,073 m)
- Prominence: 324 ft (99 m)
- Parent peak: Mount Thompson (13,494 ft)
- Isolation: 1.13 mi (1.82 km)
- Listing: Western States Climbers
- Coordinates: 37°08′19″N 118°38′02″W

Naming
- Etymology: John Wesley Powell

Geography
- Location within California Location within the United States
- Location: Kings Canyon National Park; Fresno County / Inyo County; California, U.S.
- Parent range: Sierra Nevada
- Topo map: USGS Mount Darwin

Geology
- Rock age: Cretaceous
- Mountain type: Fault block
- Rock type: granitic

Climbing
- First ascent: 1925
- Easiest route: class 3 scrambling

Mount Powell is a 13,364-foot-elevation (4,073-meter) mountain summit located on the crest of the Sierra Nevada mountain range in California, United States. It is situated on the shared boundary of Kings Canyon National Park with John Muir Wilderness, and along the common border of Fresno County with Inyo County. It is also 19 miles (31 km) west of the community of Big Pine, and 1.17 miles (1.88 km) west of Mount Thompson, which is the nearest higher neighbor. Mount Powell ranks as the 81st highest peak in California, and the 10th highest of the Evolution Region of the Sierra Nevada. The west summit is unofficially known as "Point John." Two other peaks on the mountain are informally called "Point Wesley" (13,356 ft) in the middle, and "Point Powell" (13,360+ ft) one-half mile to the east.

== History ==
This mountain was named in 1911 by Robert B. Marshall, chief USGS geographer, to commemorate John Wesley Powell (1834–1902), geologist, surveyor, map maker, explorer, and director of the United States Geological Survey from 1881 through 1894. The first ascent of the peak was made August 1, 1925, by Walter L. Huber and James Rennie, two of the foremost mountaineers of the Sierra Club, with Huber serving as club president from 1925 to 1927. In 1983 the U.S. Board on Geographic Names revised the location of the summit from Point Wesley to Point John.

== Climbing ==
Established climbing routes on Mount Powell:

- South plateau – class 3 – 1925 by Walter L. Huber, James Rennie
- Northwest chute – class 3 – June 29, 1931 by Norman Clyde
- East ridge – class 3 – Norman Clyde
- North-northwest face – class 3 – August 27, 1967 by Andy Smatko + 17 others

== Climate ==
According to the Köppen climate classification system, Mount Powell is located in an alpine climate zone. Most weather fronts originate in the Pacific Ocean, and travel east toward the Sierra Nevada mountains. As fronts approach, they are forced upward by the peaks, causing them to drop their moisture in the form of rain or snowfall onto the range (orographic lift). Precipitation runoff from this mountain drains south into the Middle Fork Kings River, and north into Bishop Creek. Maps from the 1980s show Powell Glacier drawn on the north aspect of the mountain, however satellite images show that the glacier has since disappeared, a result of climate change.

== See also ==
- List of the major 4000-meter summits of California
