= Hurd Peak =

Californian summit

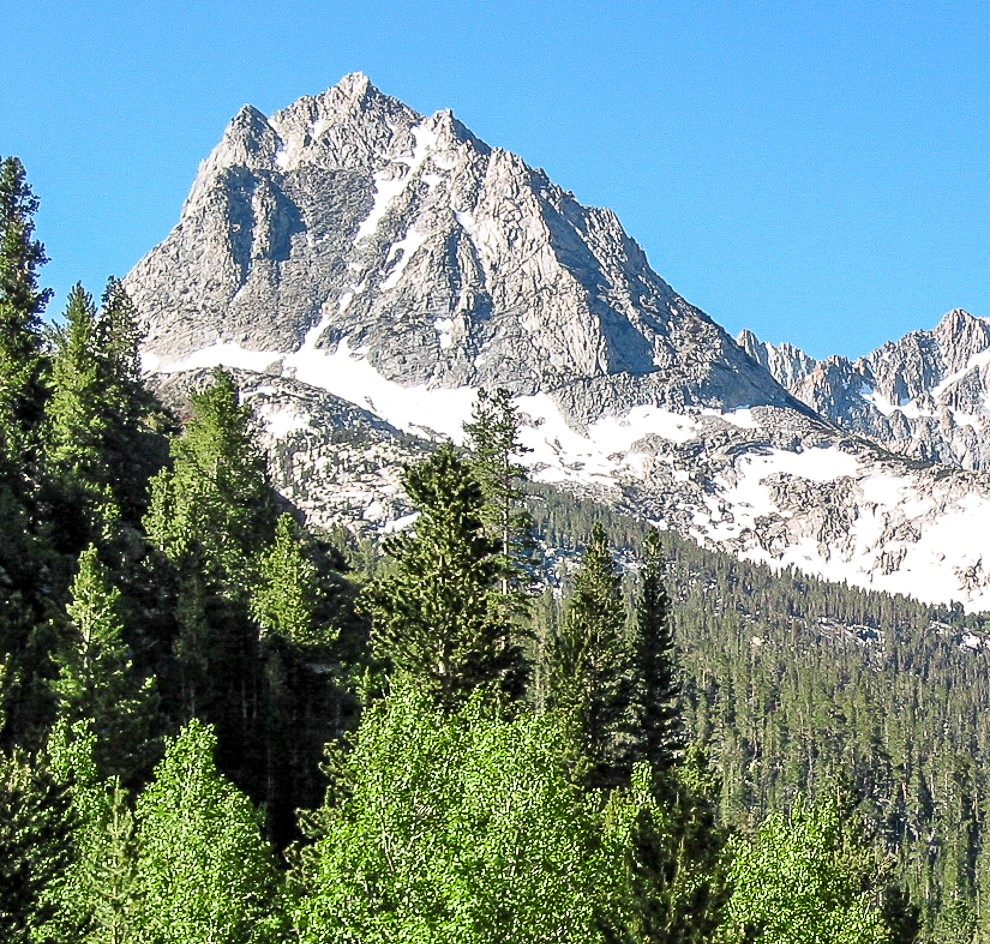
- North aspect, from South Lake

Highest point
- Elevation: 12,237 ft (3,730 m) NAVD 88
- Prominence: 477 ft (145 m)
- Parent peak: Mount Goode (13,085 ft)
- Isolation: 1.23 mi (1.98 km)
- Coordinates: 37°08′27″N 118°33′58″W

Naming
- Etymology: H.C. Hurd

Geography
- Location within California Location within the United States
- Country: United States
- State: California
- County: Inyo
- Protected area: John Muir Wilderness
- Parent range: Sierra Nevada
- Topo map: USGS Mount Thompson

Climbing
- First ascent: 1906 by H.C. Hurd
- Easiest route: Exposed scramble, class 3

Hurd Peak is a 12,237-foot-elevation (3,730-meter) mountain summit located one mile east of the crest of the Sierra Nevada mountain range in Inyo County of northern California, United States. Surrounded by lakes, it is situated in the John Muir Wilderness, on land managed by Inyo National Forest. It is approximately 16 miles (26 km) west of the community of Big Pine, 2 miles (3.2 km) west of Picture Puzzle, and 1.23 miles (1.98 km) north of parent Mount Goode. Topographic relief is significant as the north aspect rises nearly 2,500 feet (760 meters) above South Lake in approximately one mile.

== Etymology ==
This mountain's toponym was officially adopted in 1920 by the U.S. Board on Geographic Names based on a recommendation by the Sierra Club. It honors the memory of Hurd Clarence Hurd (April 16, 1870 – July 8, 1914), who made the first ascent in 1906 while connected with development work in the vicinity. H. C. Hurd was a civil engineer who received his degree from Princeton University in 1893. He was elected as a member of the American Society of Civil Engineers in 1913, but the following year met an untimely death by accidental drowning in Chesapeake Bay.

== Climbing ==
Established climbing routes on Hurd Peak:

- West Face via Treasure Lakes – class 3
- East Face – class 3
- South Ridge – class 4
- Northeast Arete – class 5.5
- North Ridge – class 5.7

== Climate ==
According to the Köppen climate classification system, Hurd Peak is located in an alpine climate zone. Most weather fronts originate in the Pacific Ocean, and travel east toward the Sierra Nevada mountains. As fronts approach, they are forced upward by the peaks, causing them to drop their moisture in the form of rain or snowfall onto the range (orographic lift). Precipitation runoff from this mountain drains into the South Fork of Bishop Creek.

== Gallery ==
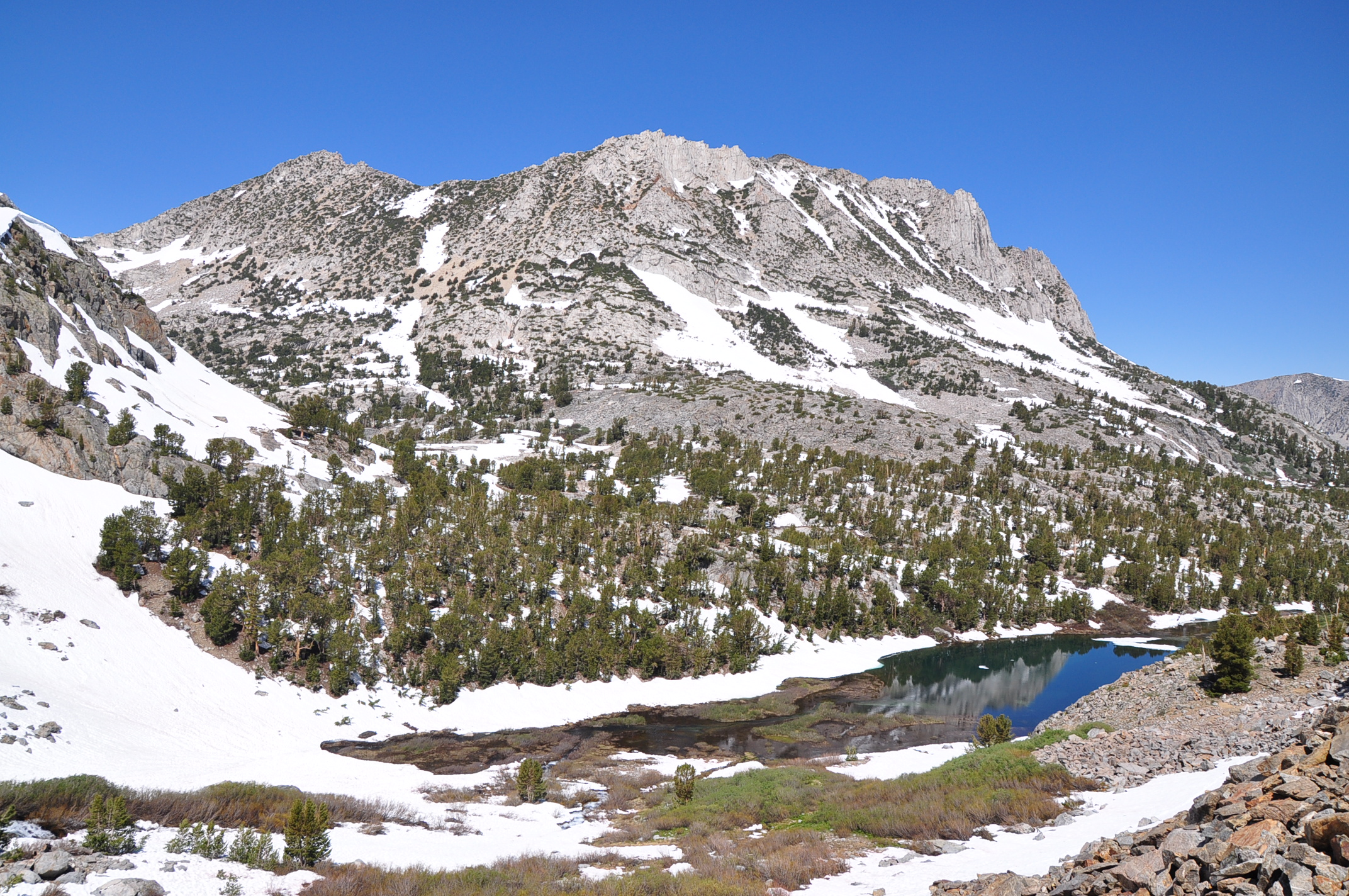
Southeast aspect

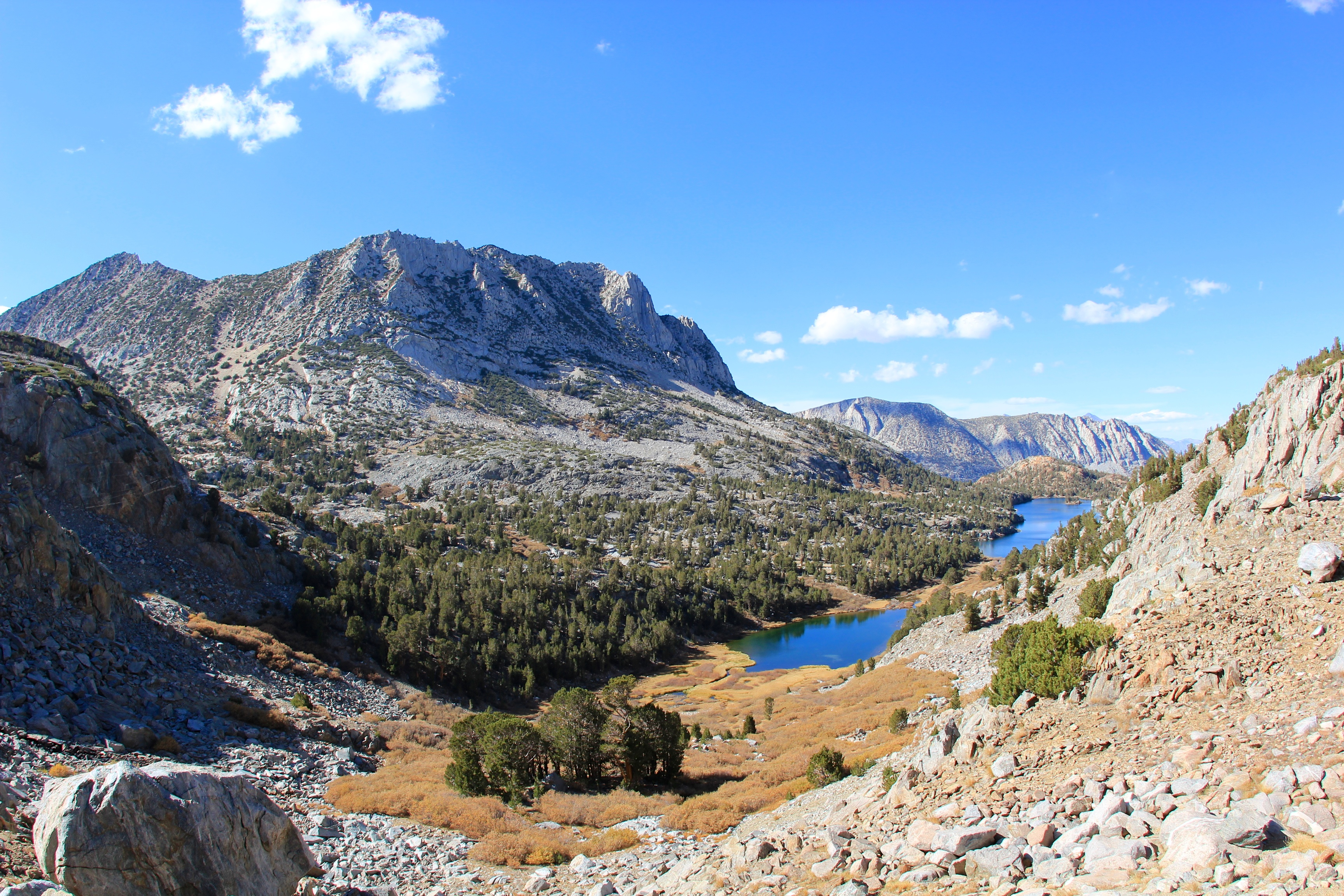
Southeast aspect, with Spearhead Lake and Long Lake

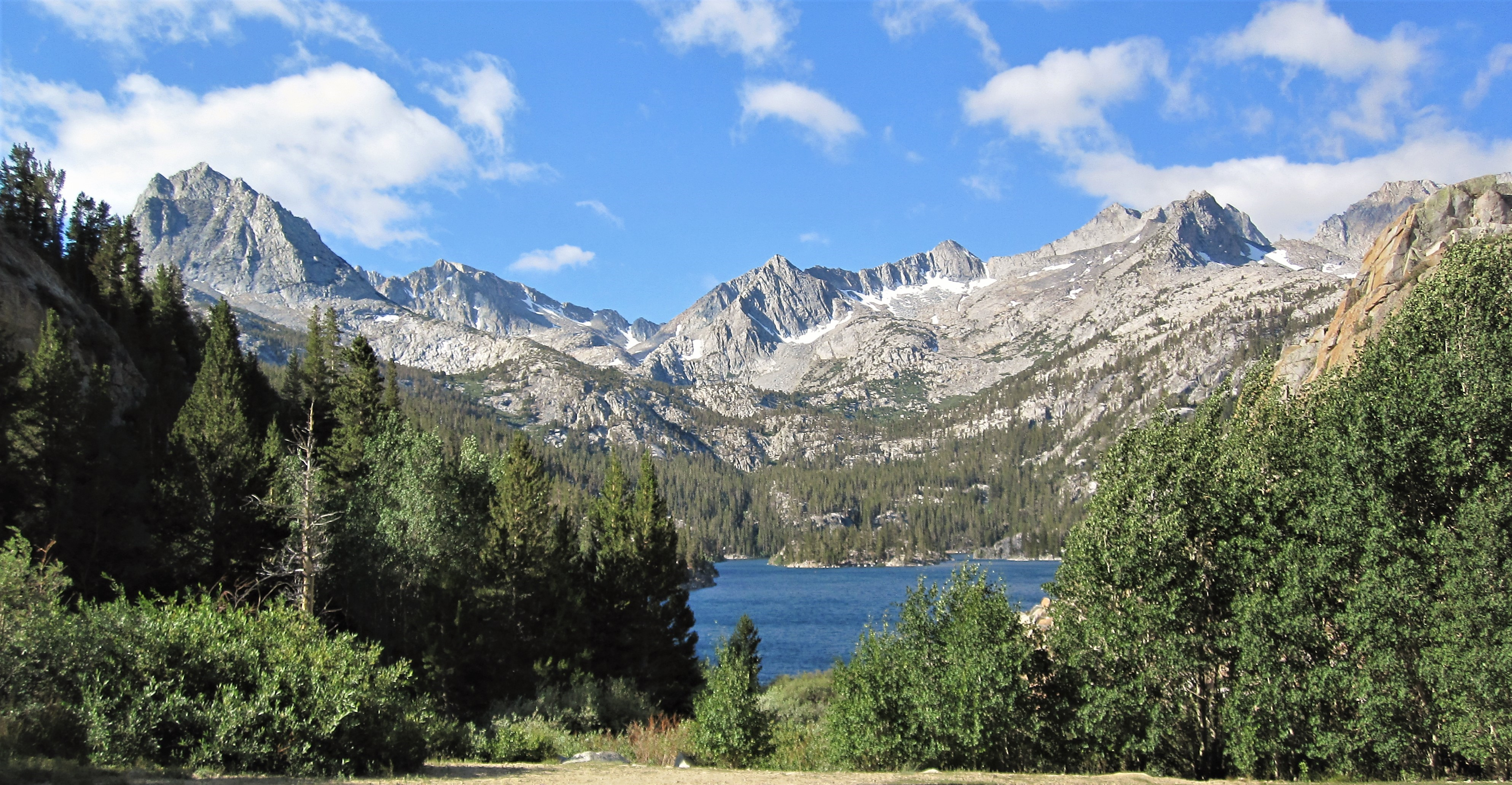
Hurd Peak (left) from South Lake

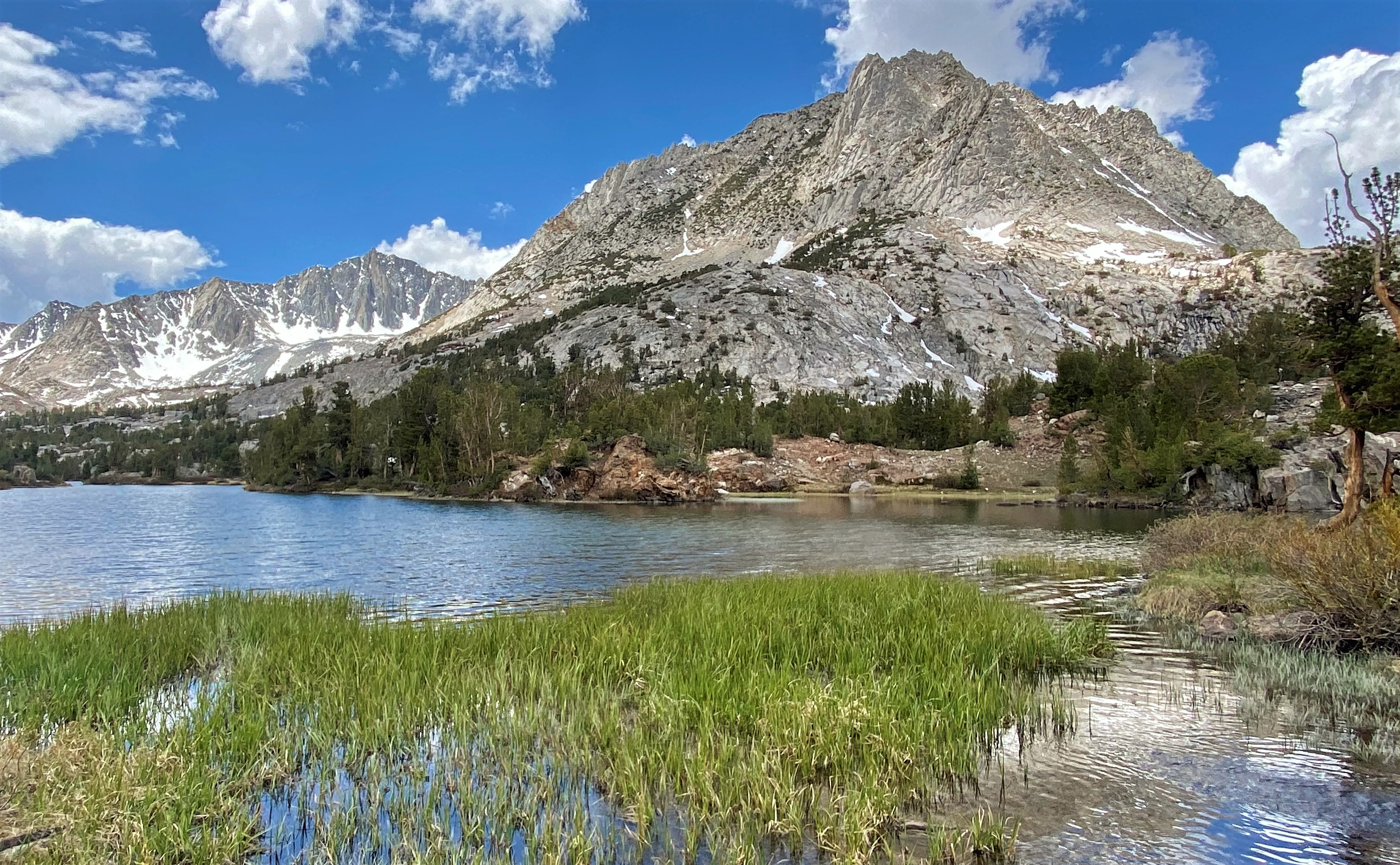
North aspect, with Mt. Goode to left

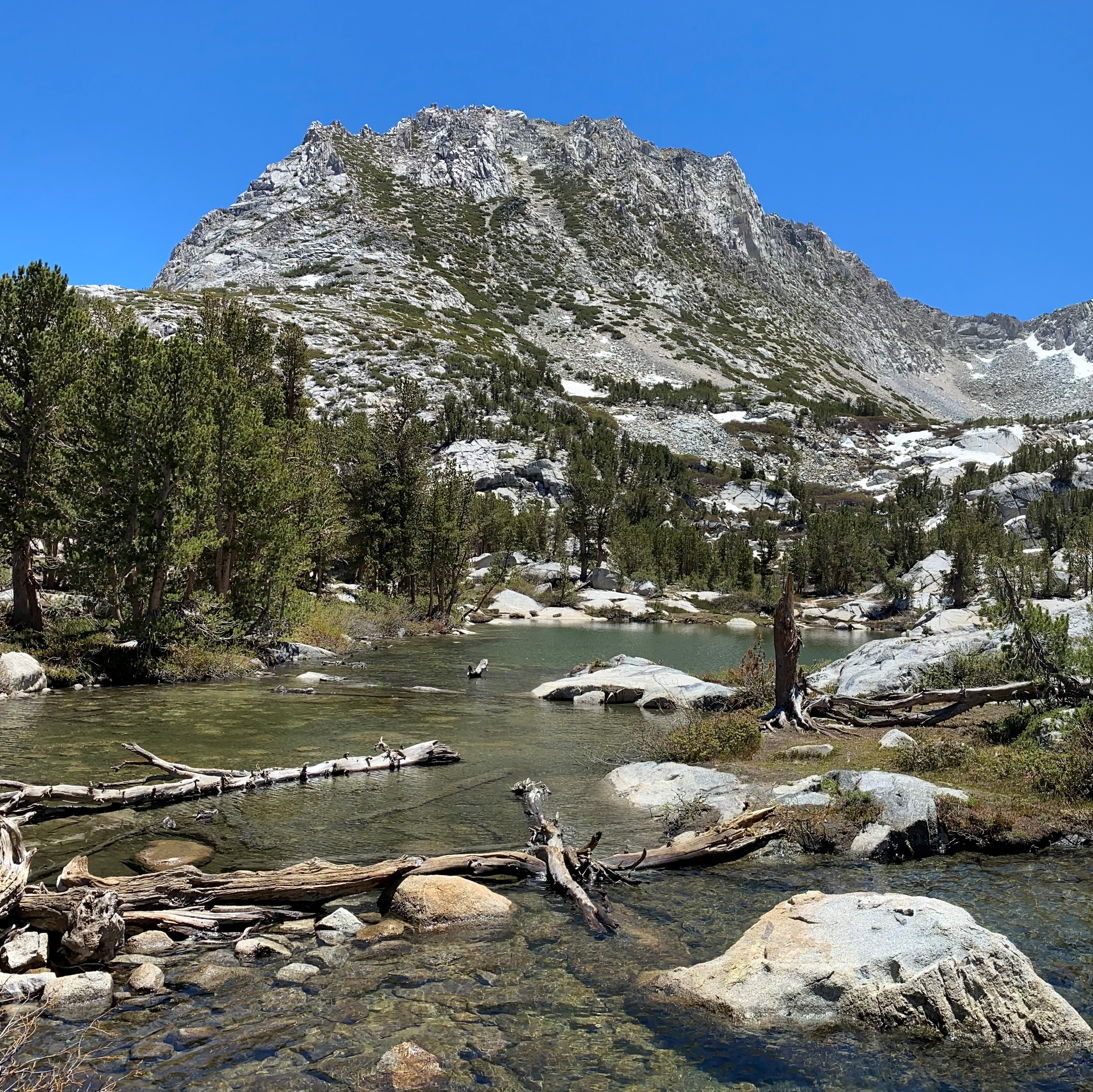
Northwest aspect, from Lake 10668 of Treasure Lakes

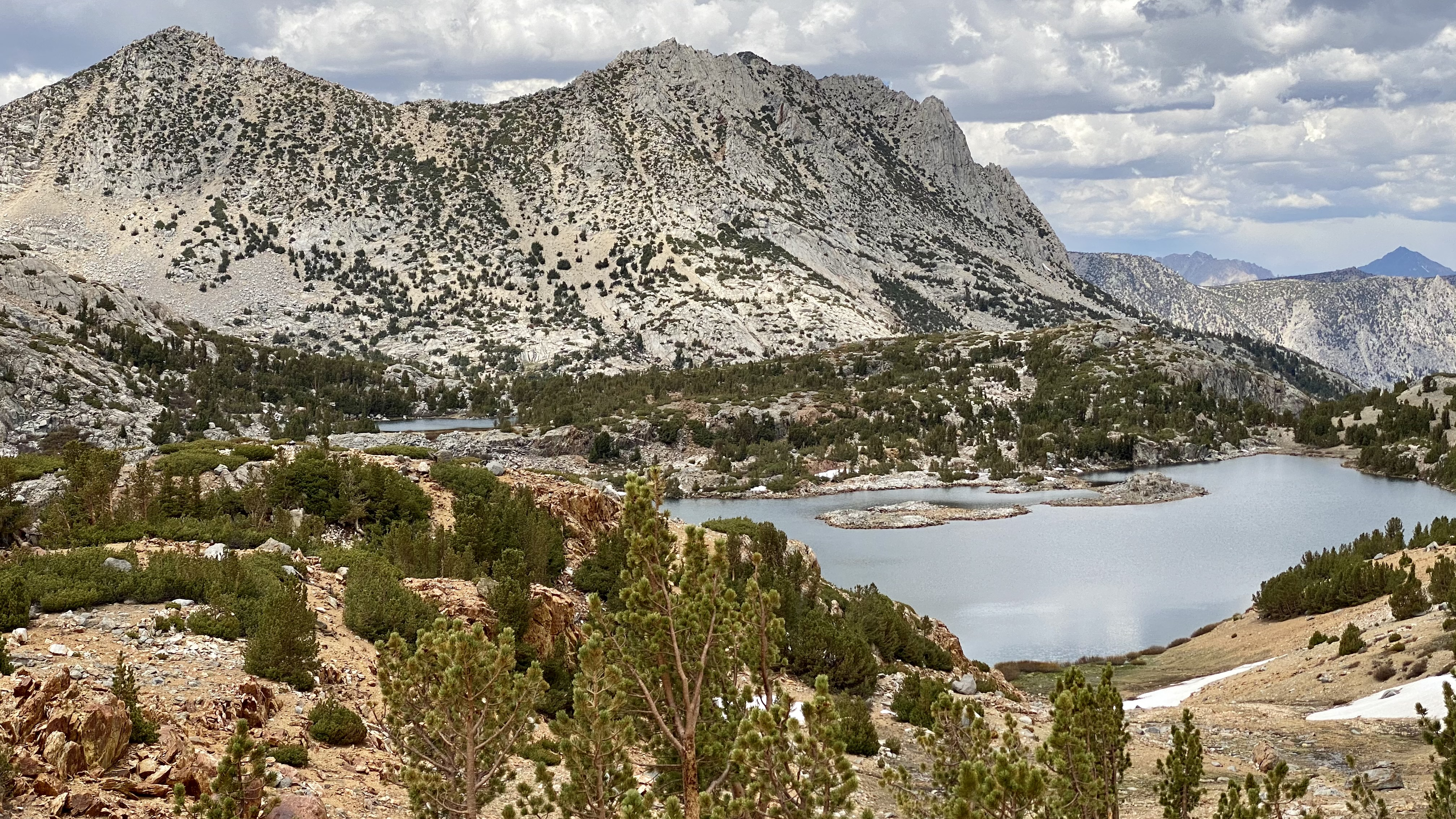
Southeast aspect, with Saddlerock Lake

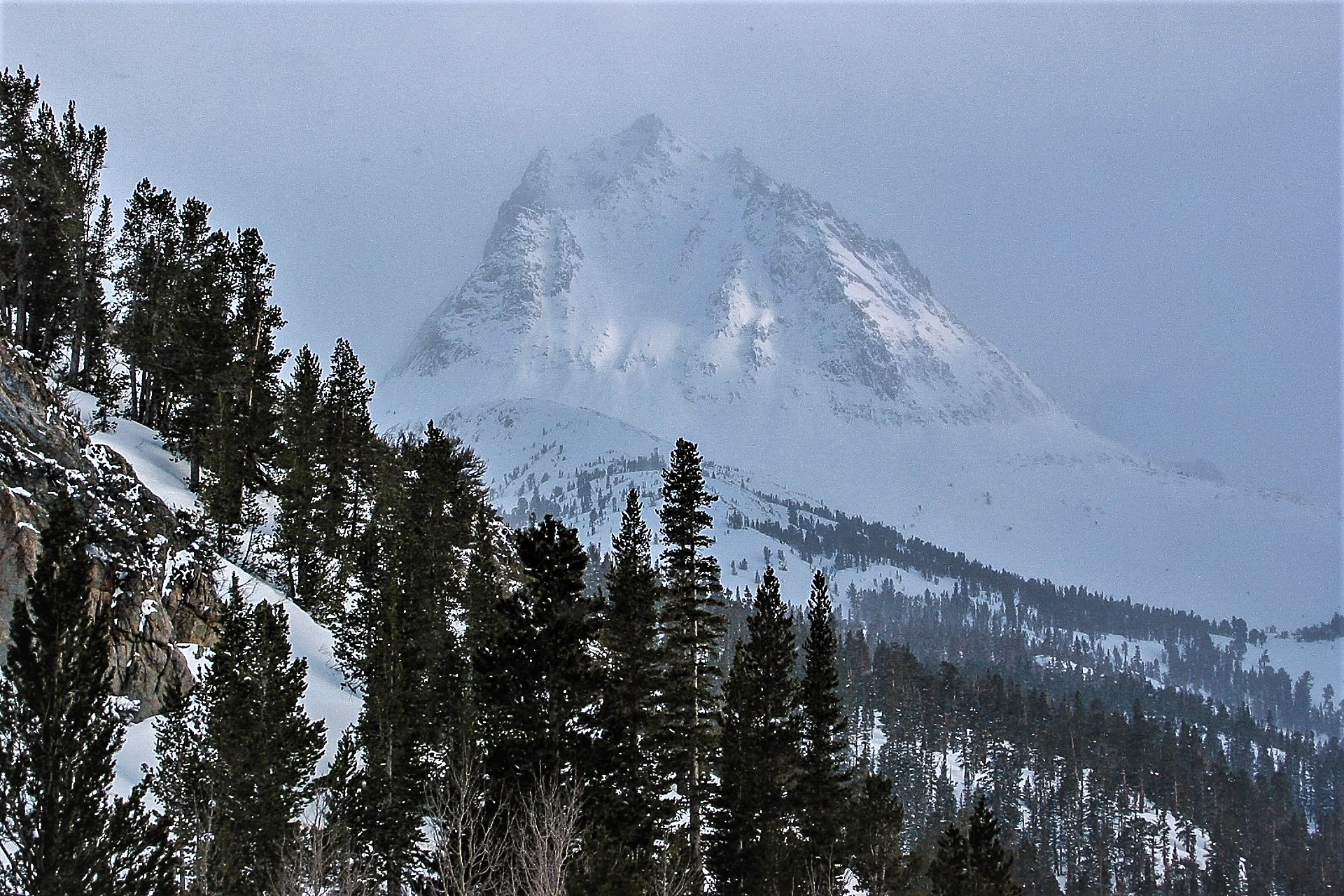

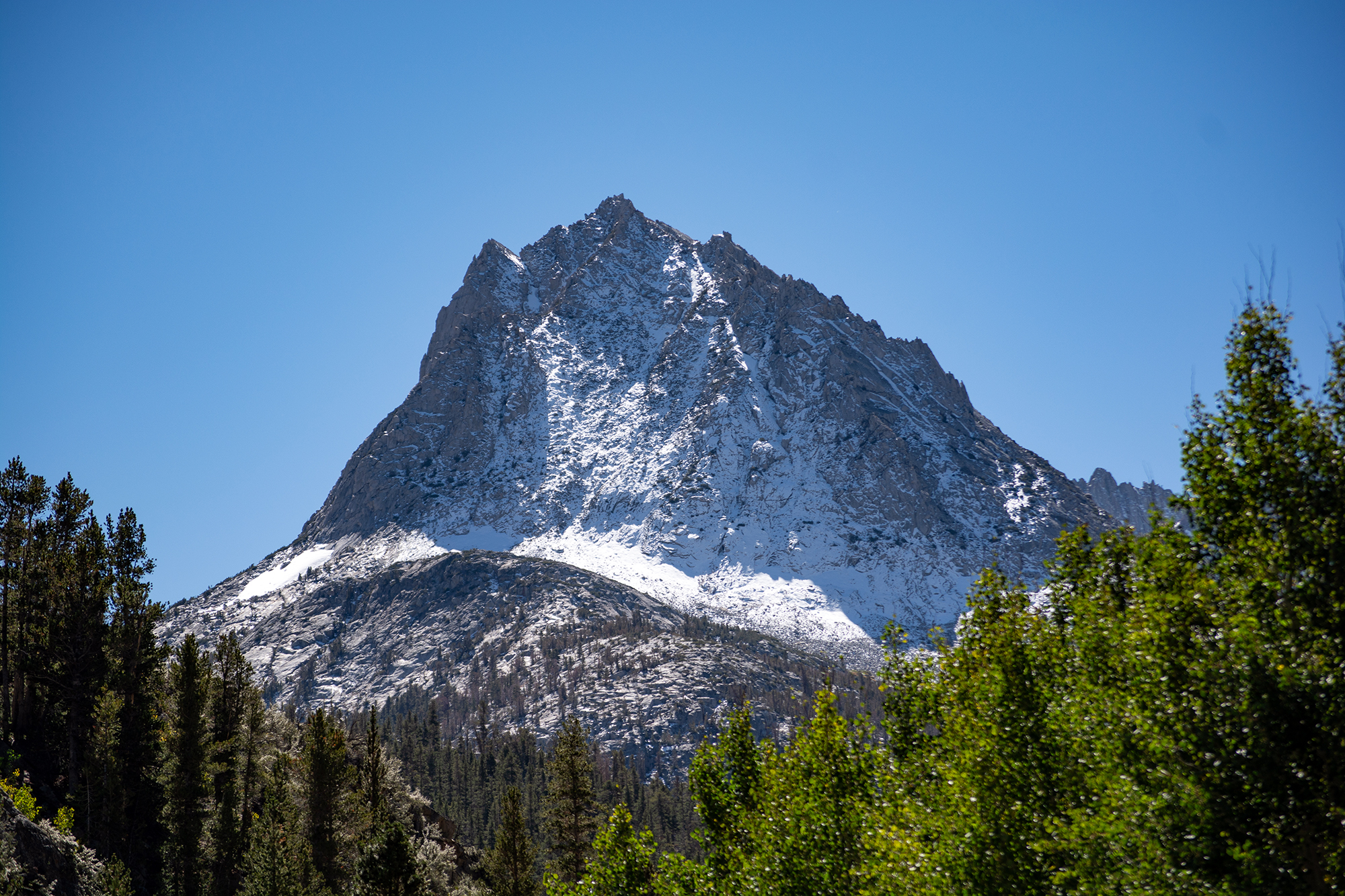
North aspect
