= Powell Glacier =

Glacier in California, United States

- Location within California
- Type: Mountain glacier
- Location: Inyo National Forest, inyo County, California, U.S.
- Coordinates: 37°08′26″N 118°37′46″W
- Length: .25 mi (0.40 km)
- Terminus: Talus
- Status: Retreating

Powell Glacier is located in the Sierra Nevada Range in the U.S. state of California. Just to the northeast of Mount Powell (13,364 ft (4,073 m)), the glacier is within the John Muir Wilderness of Inyo National Forest at an elevation of 12,523 ft (3,817 m).

== See also ==
- List of glaciers in the United States
