= Willard Drake Johnson =

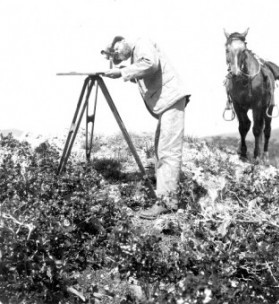
Willard Drake Johnson in the field

Willard Drake Johnson (1860-1917) was an American glaciologist, topographer, cartographer, hydrographer, geologist, geographer, and ethnologist. His career began under the tutelage of Grove Karl Gilbert on the Lake Bonneville survey. In 1882 he joined US Geological Survey under John Wesley Powell. From 1882 until 1896 he was in the topographic portion of the survey. In 1888 he co-founded the National Geographic Society. From 1888 until 1890 he surveyed the Arkansas River in Colorado. In 1891 he became the chief of the California, where he co-founded the Sierra Club and became a good friend of John Muir. In 1895 Johnson went on an expedition to Sonora, where he studied the Seri Indians. In 1897 he joined the Water Resources Branch of the US Geological Survey, where he worked in Oklahoma. From 1904 until 1905 he worked in Utah and the Sierra Nevada, where he studied glacial geology. After that he worked for the US Forest Service in Portland, Oregon until 1916. He worked in the Grand Canyon until his death there on February 13, 1917. Mount Johnson in the Sierra Nevada of California is named in his honor.
