= Mount Thompson (California) =

Mountain in the state of California

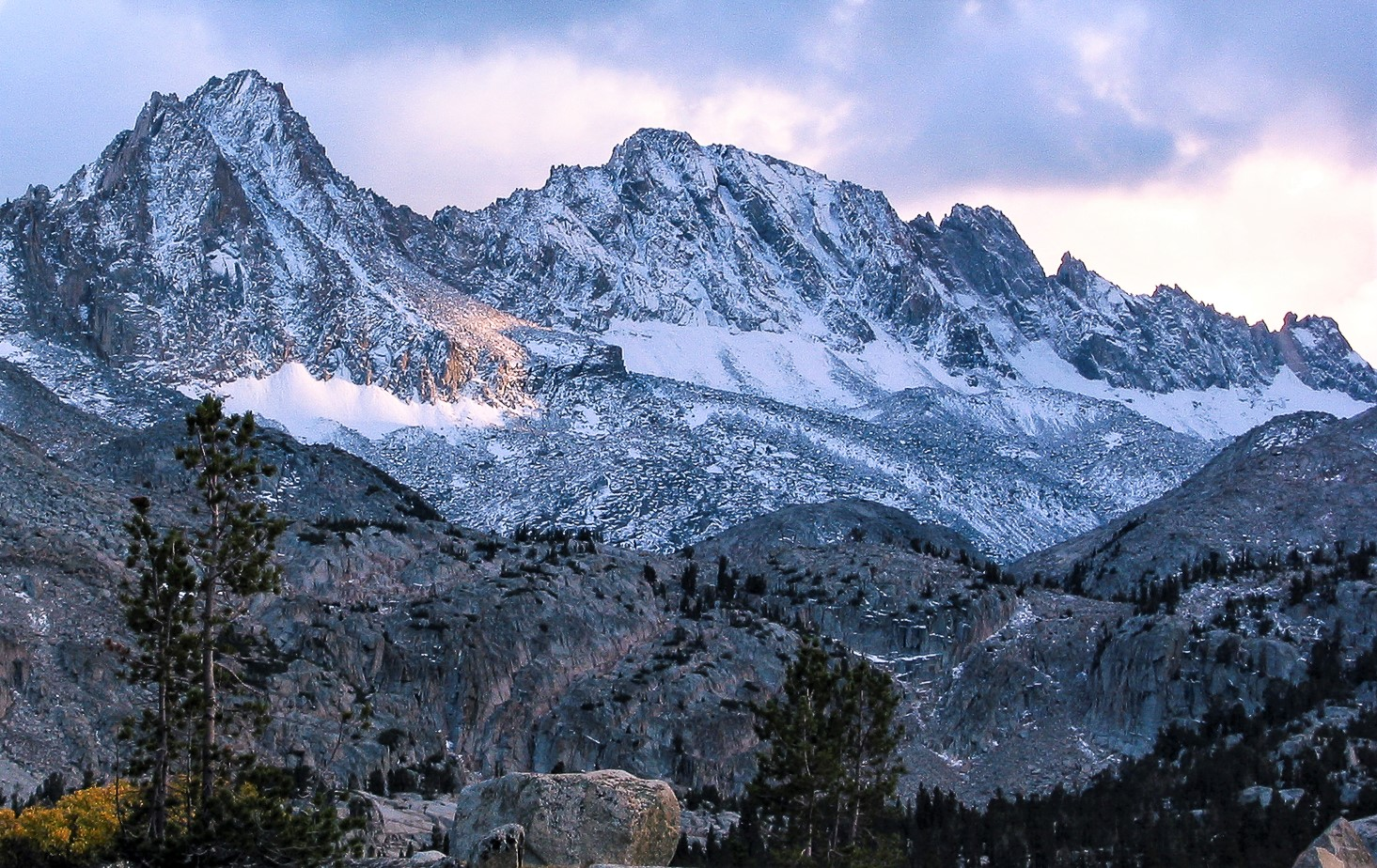
- North aspect, centered

Highest point
- Elevation: 13,494 ft (4,113 m)
- Prominence: 1,054 ft (321 m)
- Parent peak: Mount Fiske (13,503 ft)
- Isolation: 3.02 mi (4.86 km)
- Listing: Sierra Peaks Section
- Coordinates: 37°08′34″N 118°36′49″W

Naming
- Etymology: Almon Harris Thompson

Geography
- Location within California Location within the United States
- Location: Kings Canyon National Park; Fresno County / Inyo County; California, U.S.
- Parent range: Sierra Nevada
- Topo map: USGS Mount Thompson

Geology
- Rock type: granite

Climbing
- First ascent: 1909
- Easiest route: class 2

Mount Thompson is a 13,494-foot-elevation (4,113-meter) mountain summit located on the crest of the Sierra Nevada mountain range in California, United States. It is situated on the shared boundary of Kings Canyon National Park with John Muir Wilderness, and along the common border of Fresno County with Inyo County. It is also 18 miles (29 km) west of the community of Big Pine, one mile northwest of Mount Gilbert, and three miles east of Mount Fiske, which is the nearest higher neighbor. Mount Thompson ranks as the 62nd-highest summit in California. This mountain's name commemorates Almon Harris Thompson (1839–1906). The first ascent of the peak was made by Clarence H. Rhudy and H. F. Katzenbach in the summer of 1909.

== Climbing ==
Established climbing routes on Mount Thompson:

- Northwest Face – class 3 – First Ascent June 30, 1931, by Norman Clyde
- Southwest Face – class 2 – FA August 14, 1939, by Jack Sturgeon
- Thompson Ridge – class 3 – FA 1959
- Knudtson Couloir – class AI3 – FA 1984
- Moynier Couloir – class 5.6 – FA 1986
- Smrz Couloir – class 5.6 – FA 1990
- Harrington Couloir – class AI2
- Southeast Face – class 3–4
- West Ridge – class 3

== Climate ==
According to the Köppen climate classification system, Mount Thompson is located in an alpine climate zone. Most weather fronts originate in the Pacific Ocean, and travel east toward the Sierra Nevada mountains. As fronts approach, they are forced upward by the peaks, causing them to drop their moisture in the form of rain or snowfall onto the range (orographic lift). Precipitation runoff from this mountain drains south into the Middle Fork Kings River, and north into Bishop Creek.

== See also ==
- List of the major 4000-meter summits of California
- Mount Goode

== Gallery ==
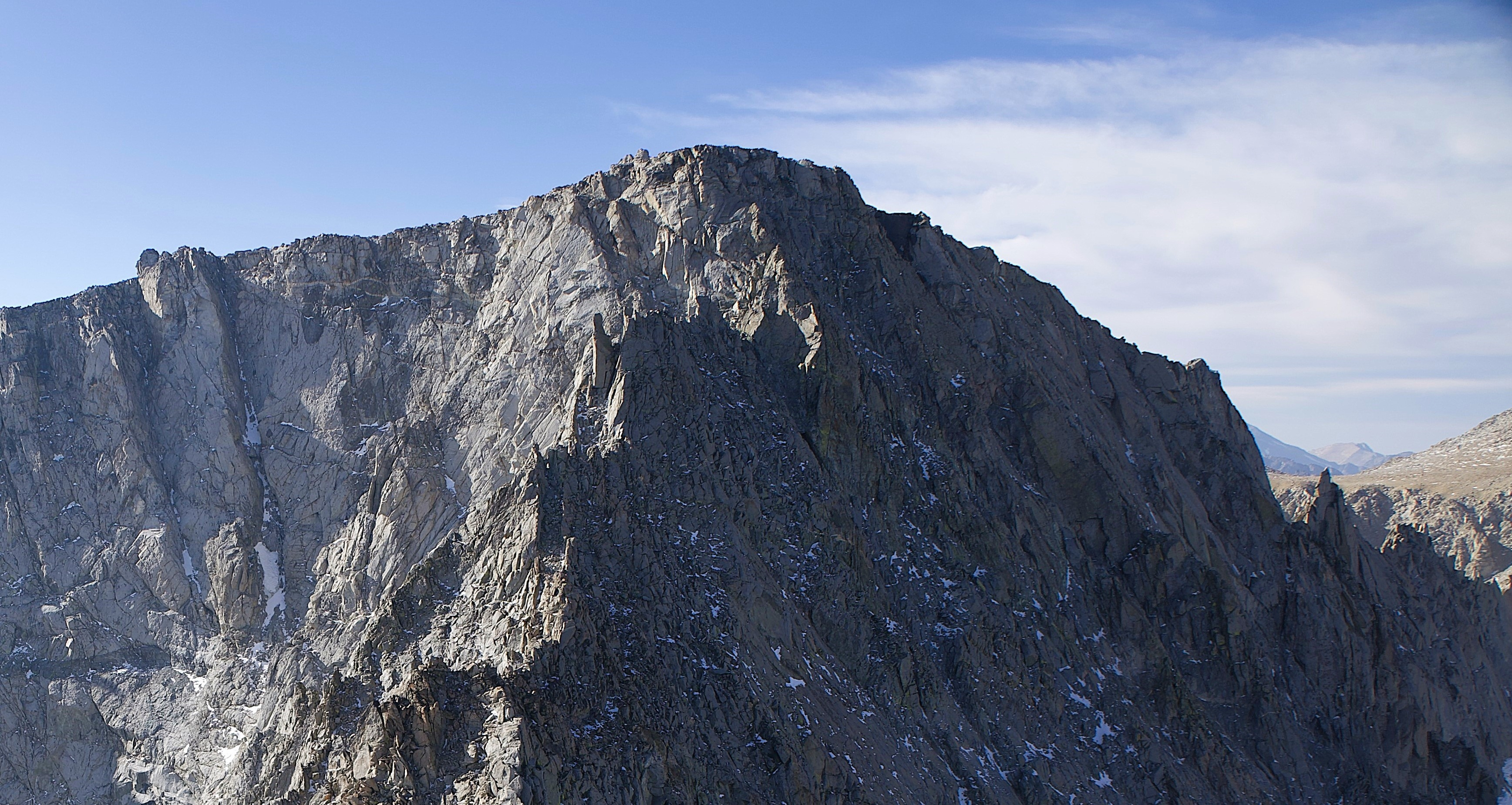
Mount Thompson viewed from Ski Mountaineers Peak

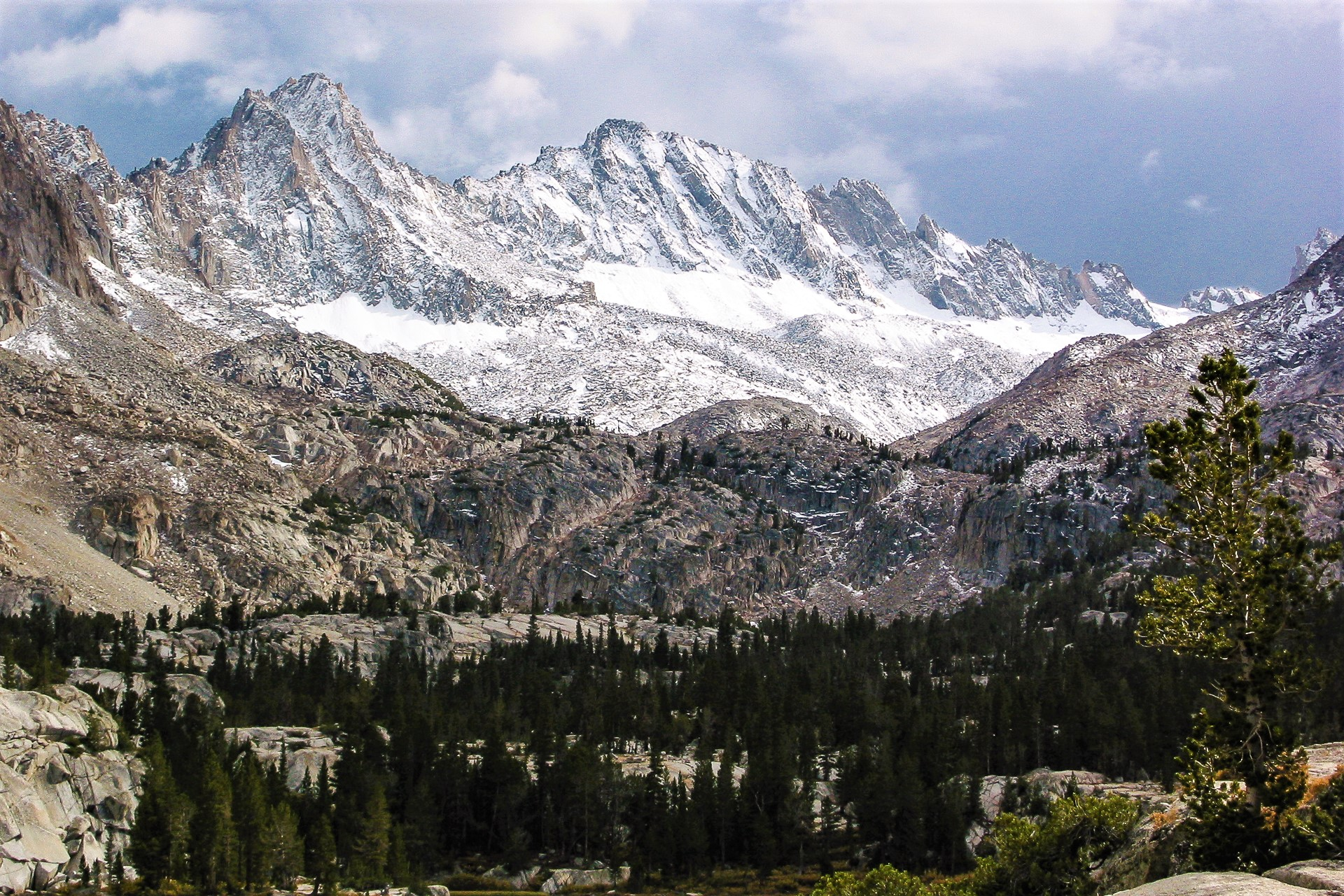
Mt. Thompson with an autumn dusting of snow.
13,280+ ft "Ski Mountaineers Peak" (left) is the highpoint of Thompson Ridge

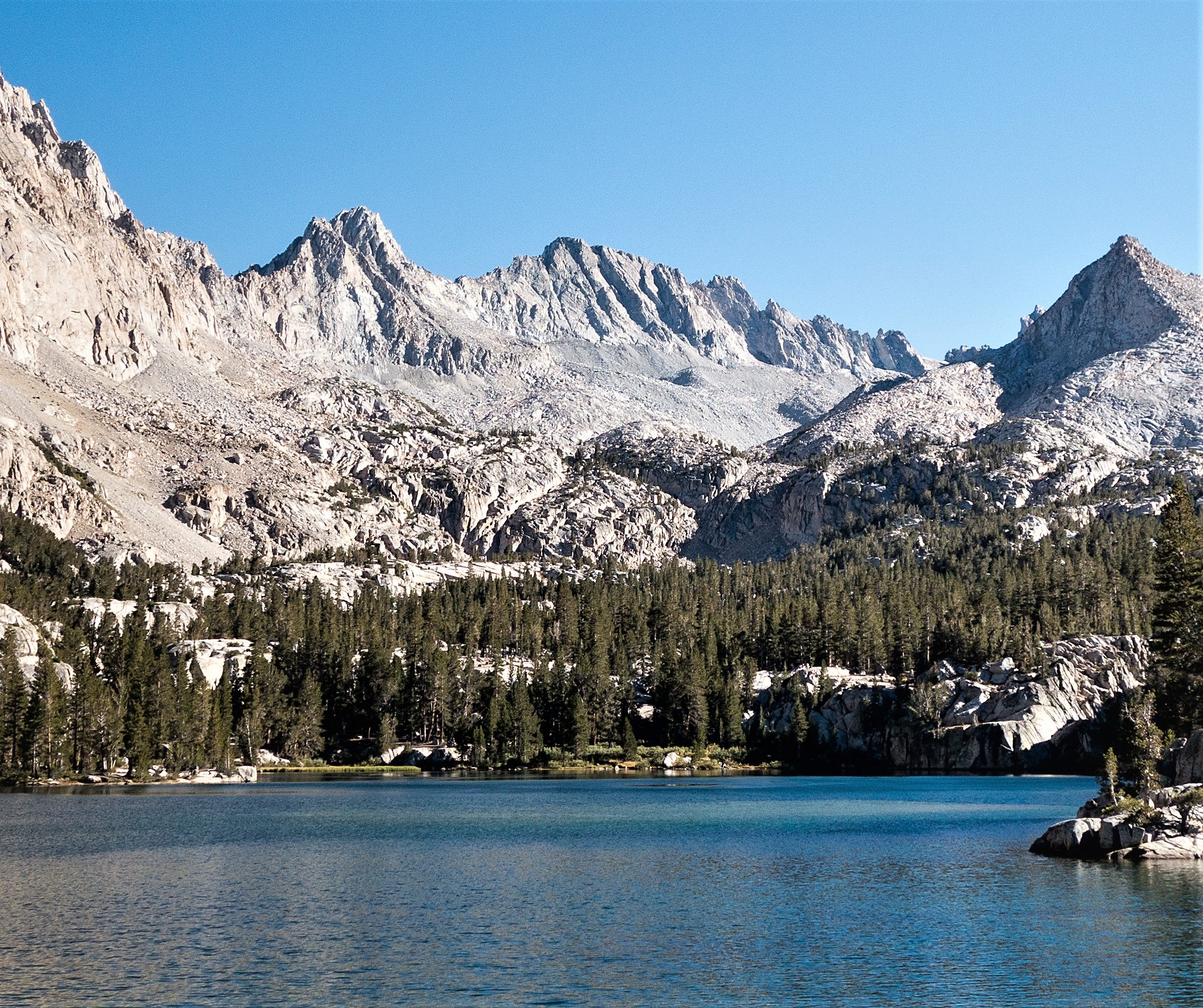
North aspect
