= Mount Goode (California) =

Mountain in California, United States

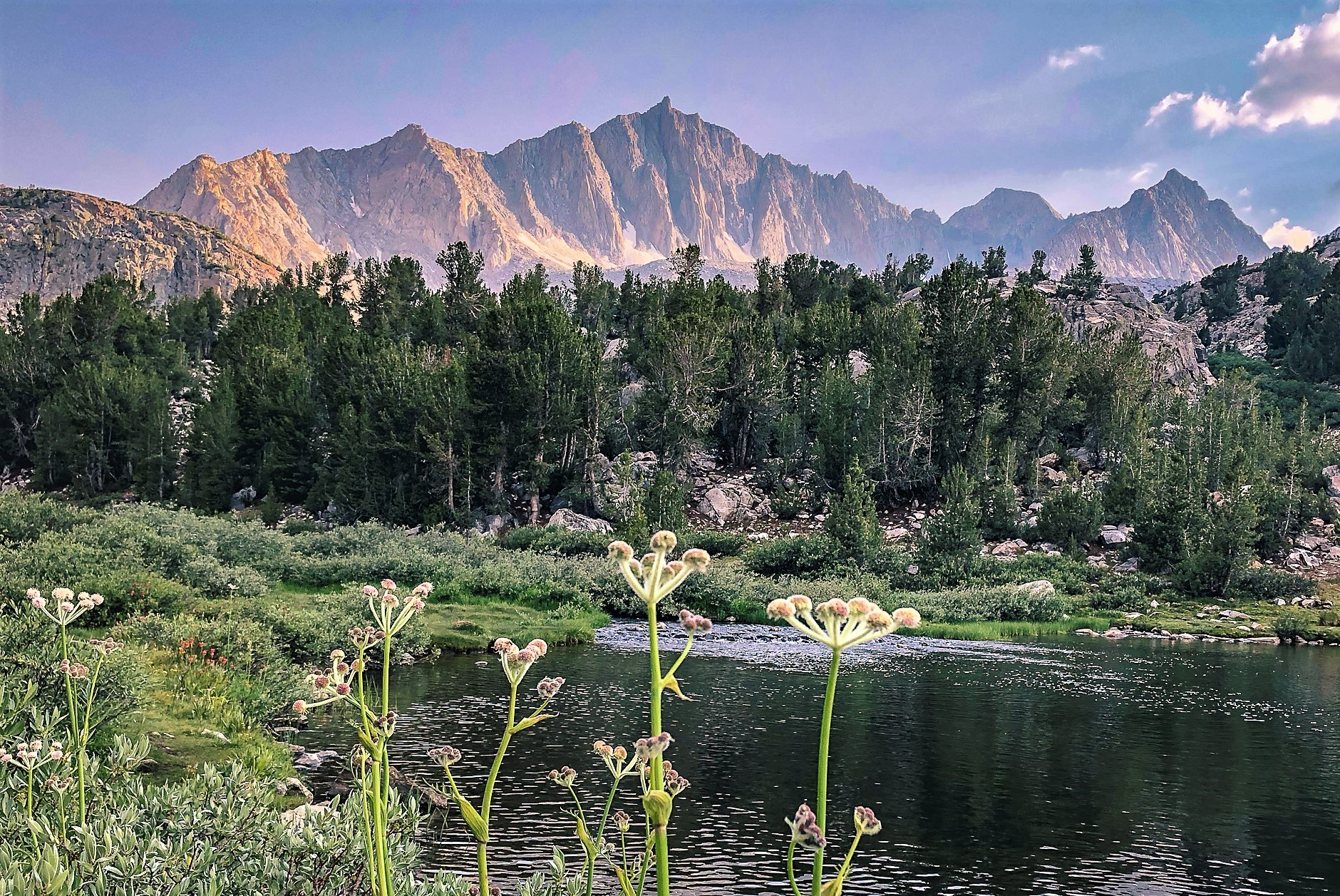
- North aspect, from Long Lake

Highest point
- Elevation: 13,085 ft (3,988 m)
- Prominence: 845 ft (258 m)
- Parent peak: Mount Gilbert
- Isolation: 1.62 mi (2.61 km)
- Listing: Sierra Peaks Section
- Coordinates: 37°07′23″N 118°34′05″W

Naming
- Etymology: Richard Urquhart Goode

Geography
- Location within California Location within the United States
- Location: Fresno and Inyo counties California, U.S.
- Parent range: Sierra Nevada
- Topo map: USGS North Palisade

Geology
- Rock type: granite

Climbing
- First ascent: July 16, 1939 by Chester Versteeg
- Easiest route: class 2

Mount Goode is a 13,085-foot-elevation (3,988-meter) mountain summit located on the crest of the Sierra Nevada mountain range in California, United States. It is situated on the shared boundary of Kings Canyon National Park with the John Muir Wilderness, and along the common border of Fresno County with Inyo County. It is also approximately one mile west-northwest of Bishop Pass, one mile east-southeast of Mount Johnson, 1.23 miles (1.98 km) south of Hurd Peak, and 16 miles (26 km) west of the community of Big Pine.

== History ==
This mountain's name and location were officially adopted in 1926 by the U.S. Board on Geographic Names based on a recommendation by the Sierra Club. Prior to 1926, the USGS placed Mount Goode at the location of Black Giant. The name commemorates Richard Urquhart Goode (1858–1903), geographer for the United States Geological Survey, in charge of the Pacific Division, Topographic Branch. The first ascent of the peak was made July 16, 1939, by Chester Versteeg, a prominent Sierra Club member.

== Climbing ==
Established rock climbing routes on Mount Goode:

Route	Class	Pitches	First Ascent
Southeast Slope	2		1939
West Ridge	5.4		
No Goode	5.4	3	
North Buttress	5.9	9	1974
Goode Earth	5.10	6	
Sky Pilot	5.11	6	2014

== Climate ==
According to the Köppen climate classification system, Mount Goode is located in an alpine climate zone. Most weather fronts originate in the Pacific Ocean, and travel east toward the Sierra Nevada mountains. As fronts approach, they are forced upward by the peaks, causing them to drop their moisture in the form of rain or snowfall onto the range (orographic lift). Precipitation runoff from this mountain drains west into the Kings River, and east to Owens River via Bishop Creek.

== Gallery ==
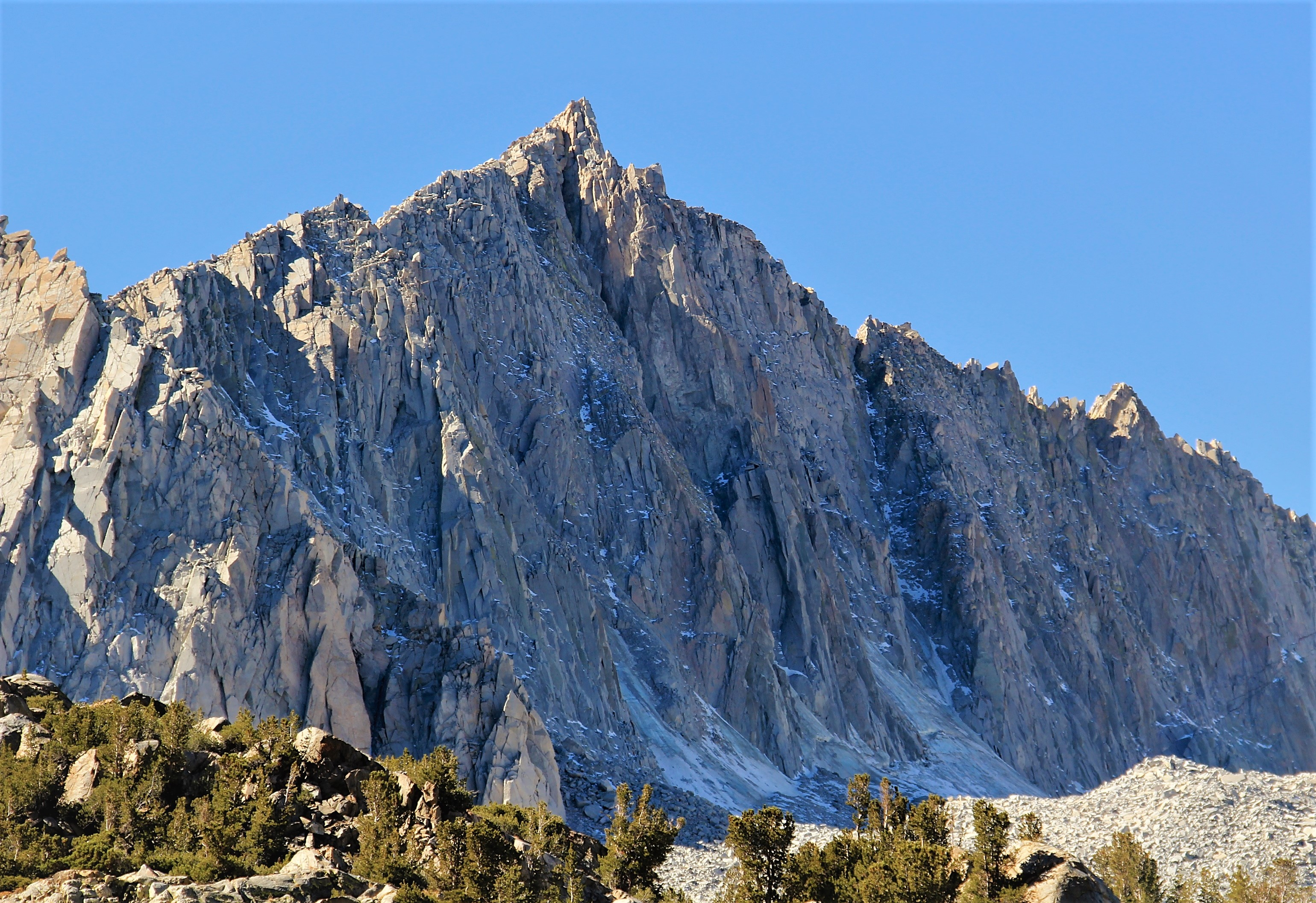
North Face of Goode

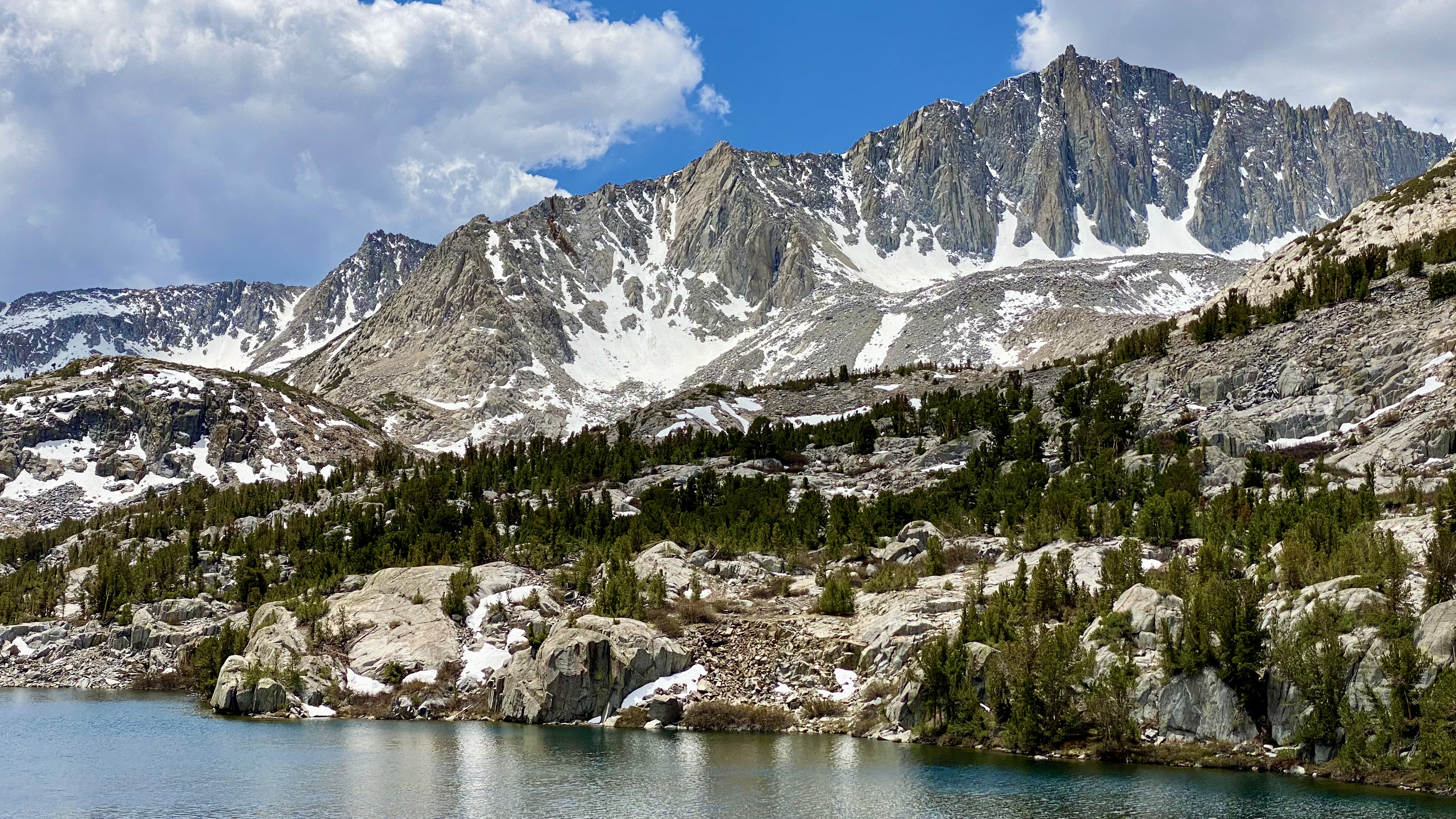

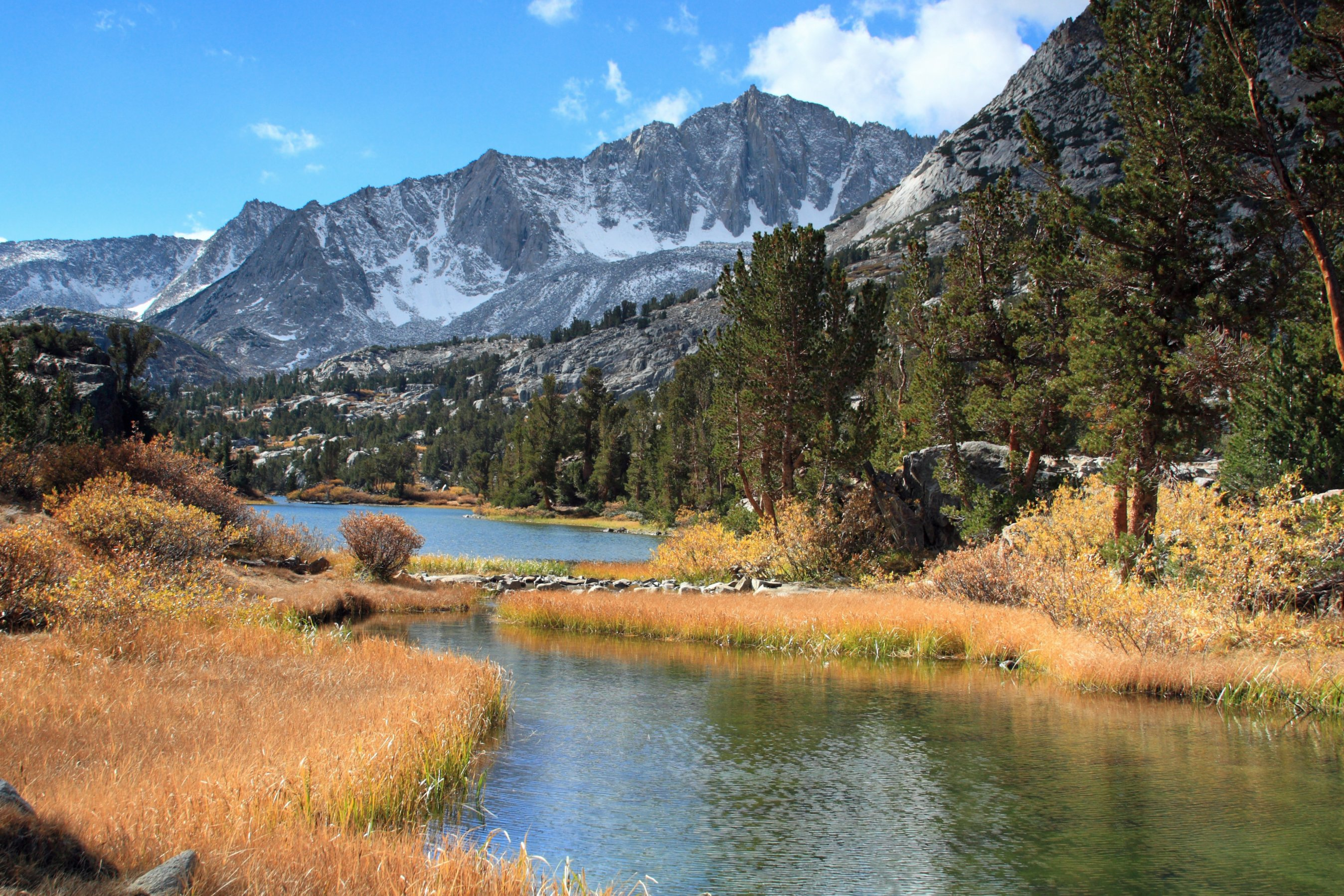
Mt. Goode from the end of Long Lake

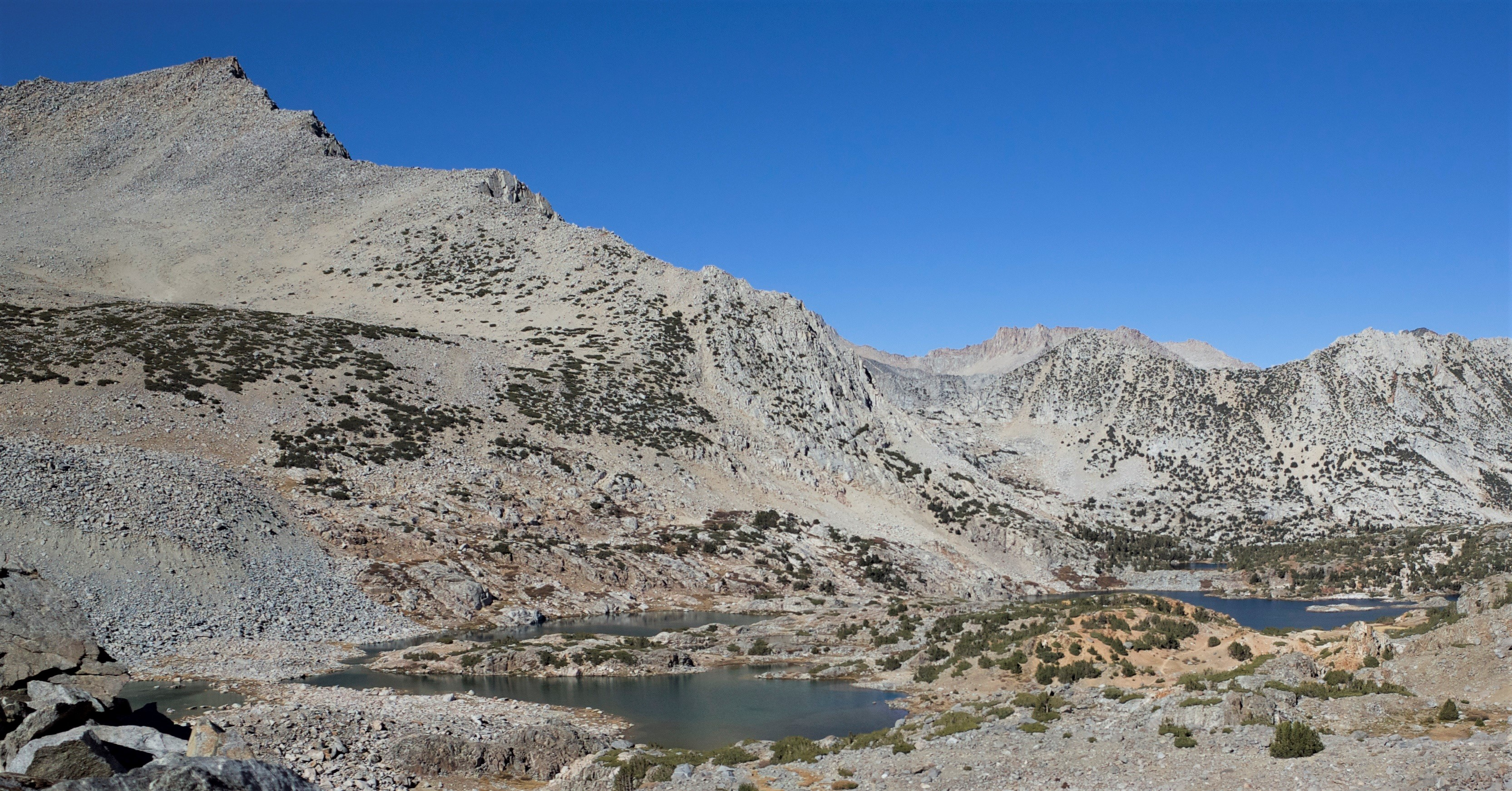
Goode's non-technical southeast slope (left) seen from Bishop Pass.
(Bishop Lake centered and Saddlerock Lake to right)

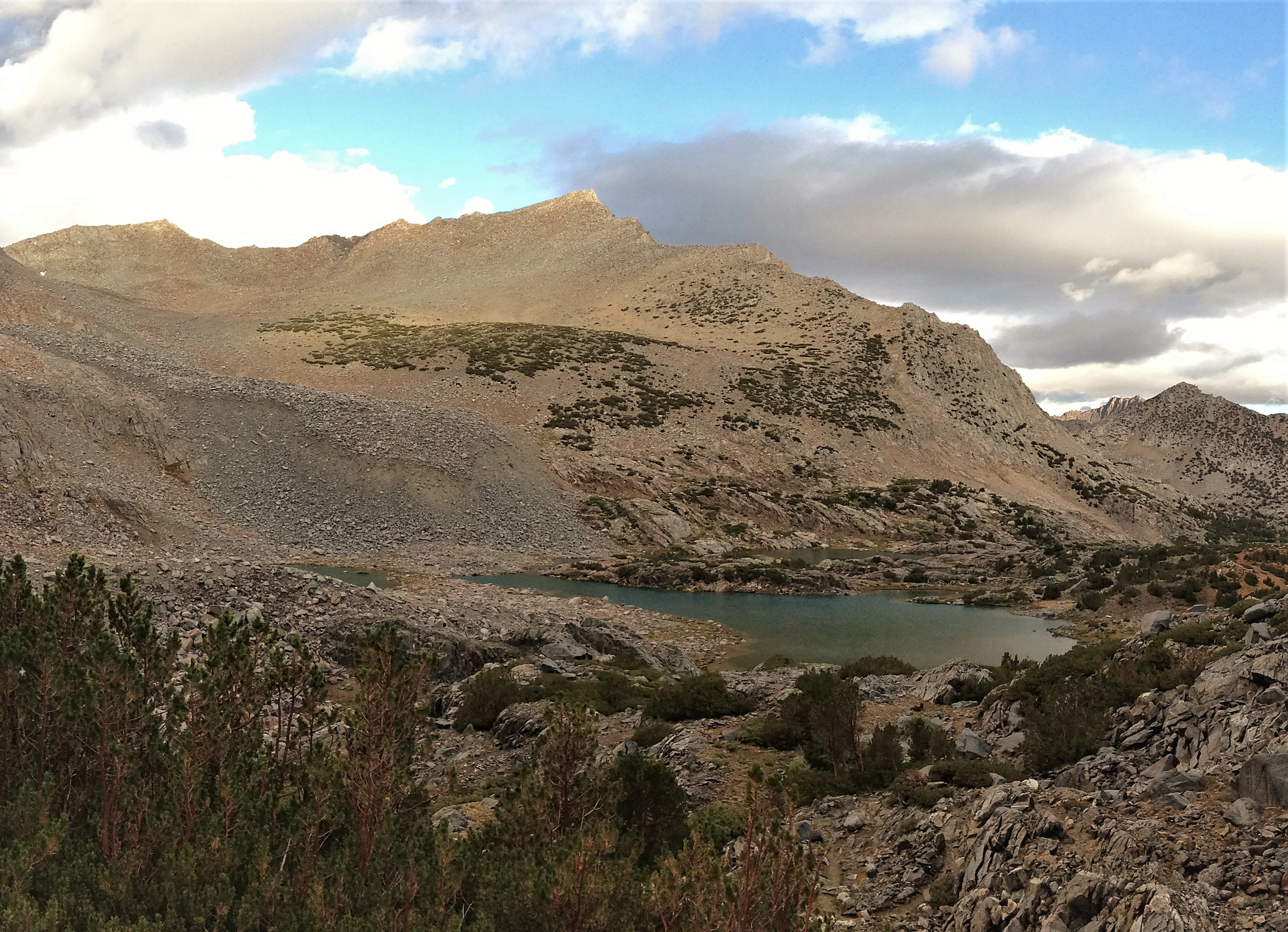
Goode's southeast slope seen from Bishop Pass

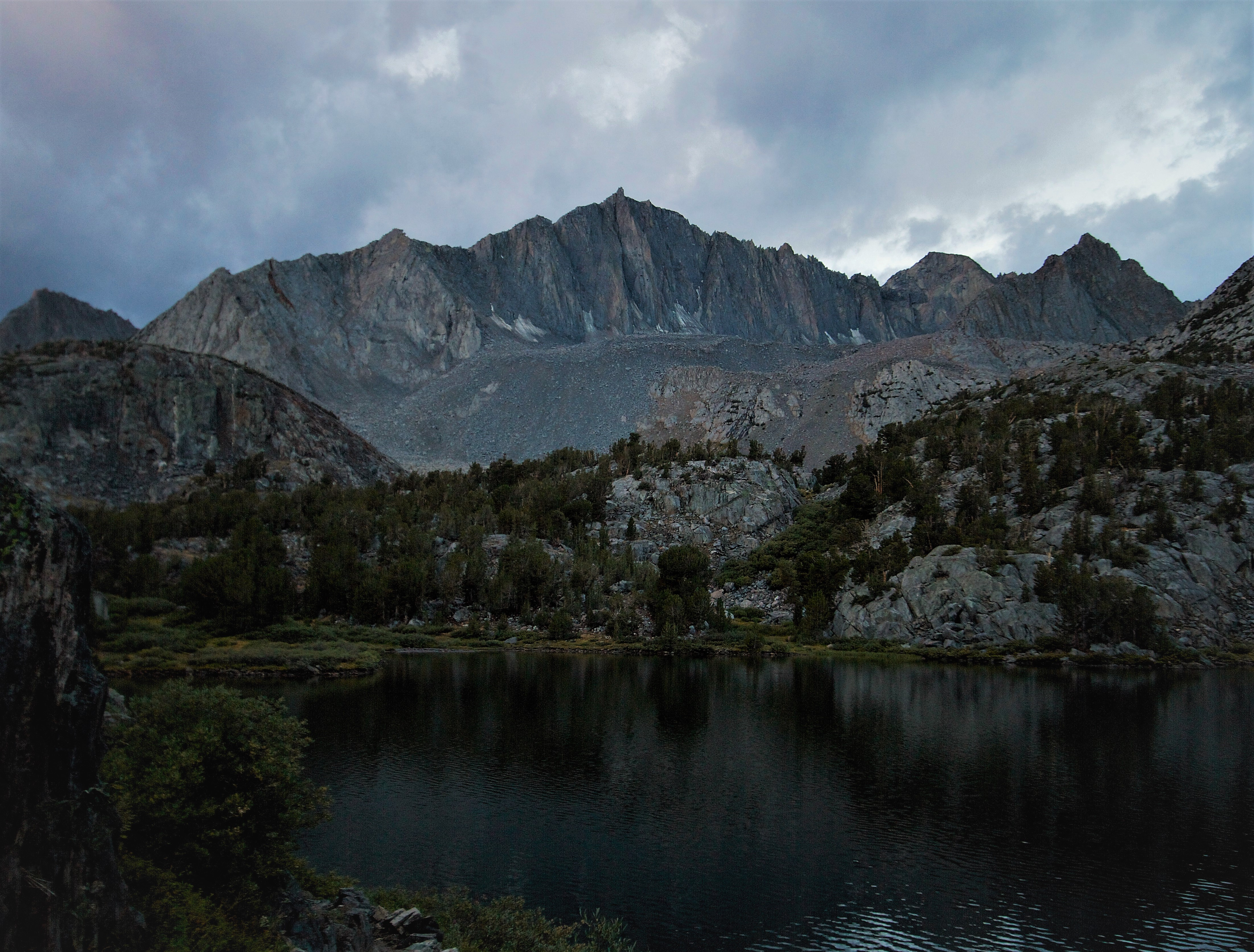
North aspect

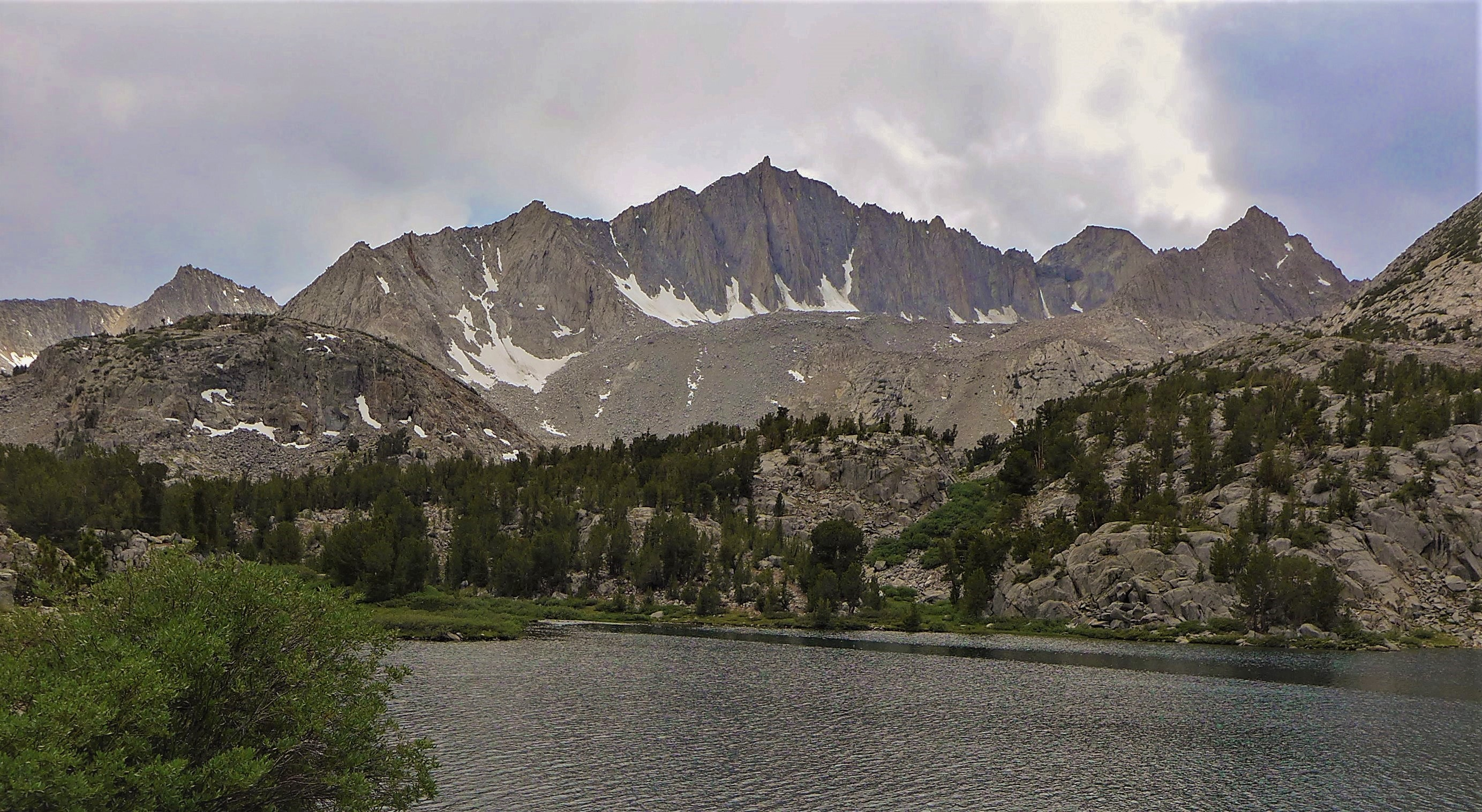

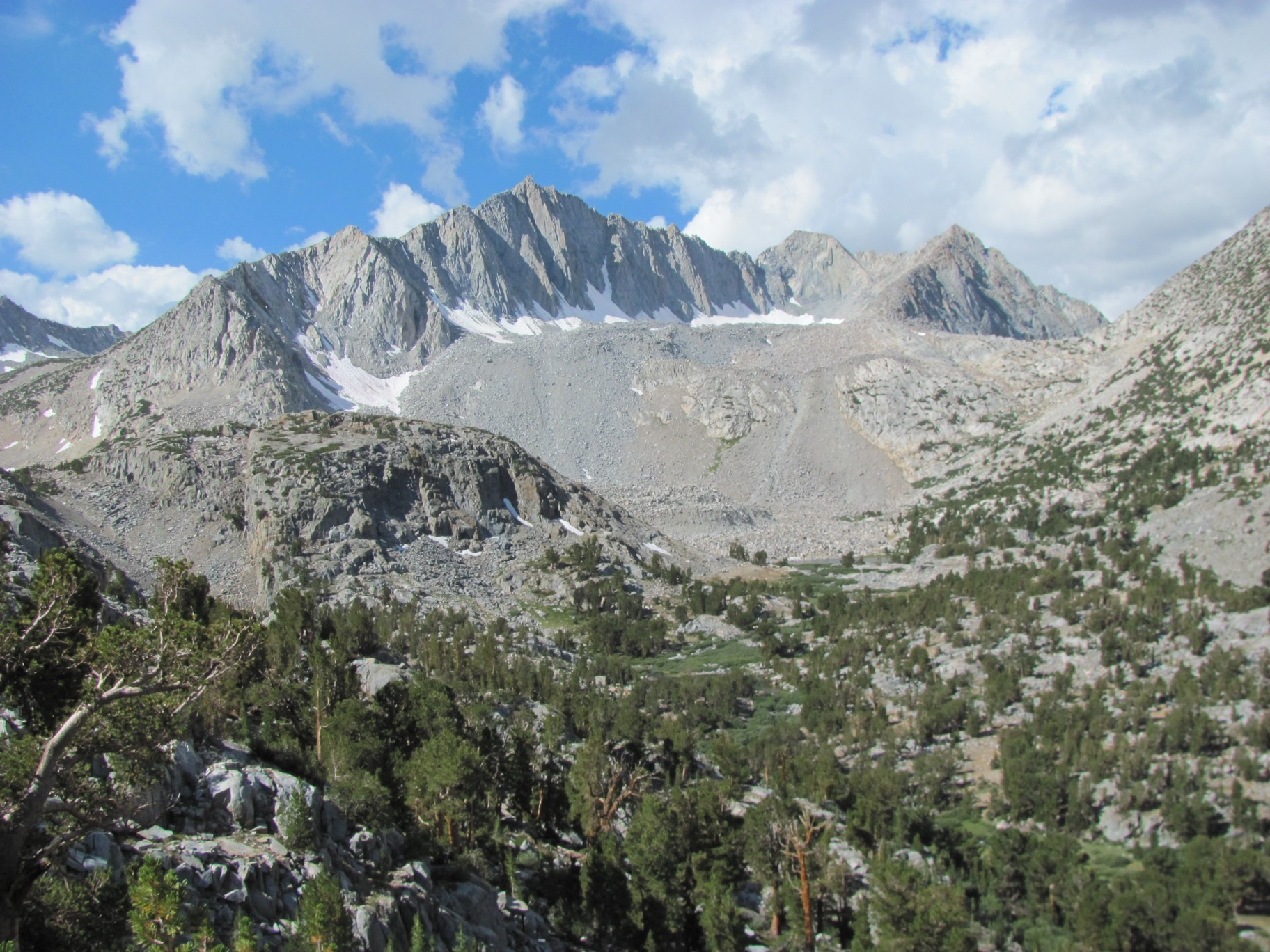

== See also ==
- Mount Goode (Alaska)
- Goode Mountain (Washington)
