= Fastook Glacier =

Glacier in Antarctica

Fastook Glacier (79°2′S 156°45′E) is a southern tributary to Mulock Glacier about 20 nautical miles (40 km) long and 5 nautical miles (9 km) wide. It heads on the north side of Longhurst Plateau in the Cook Mountains and flows north between Butcher Ridge and the Finger Ridges. It was named after James L. Fastook of the Department of Computer Science (now the School of Computing and Information Science) and the Institute for Quaternary Studies (now the Climate Change Institute) at the University of Maine, a United States Antarctic Program investigator of ice streams, ice shelves, and ice sheets over a more than 40-year period beginning about 1978.
