= George Mulock =

Anglo-Irish arctic explorer

Captain George Mulock DSO FRGS
- Born: George Francis Arthur Mulock; 7 February 1882; Fleetwood, Lancashire, England
- Died: 26 December 1963 (aged 81); Gibraltar
- Relatives: Sir William Mulock, Alfred Austin, Sir Howard William Kennard, Dinah Craik, Al Mulock, William Pate Mulock, Alfred Bentley, Robert Bentley, Redford Henry Mulock
- Military career
- Allegiance: United Kingdom
- Branch: Royal Navy
- Service years: 1896–1920; 1939–1946
- Rank: Captain, Royal Navy
- Nicknames: "Little Peterkin" (Antarctic Expedition); "Polar Mulock"
- Units: Extended Defences Office, Fort Canning (HQ Malaya Command) 1939–42
- Commands: HMS Hunter, HMS Woodlark, HMS Stag, HMS Mallrd, HMS Jed, HMS Sawfly, HMS Bee, XDO Division (Singapore)
- Conflicts: Gallipoli Campaign, Singapore
- Awards: Distinguished Service Order; Polar Medal

Captain George Francis Arthur Mulock, DSO, FRGS (7 February 1882 – 26 December 1963) was an Anglo-Irish Royal Navy officer, cartographer and polar explorer who participated in an expedition to the Antarctic regions: the Discovery Expedition, 1901–04. After compiling the reports, logs and maps of the expedition, Mulock returned to full-time service, seeing action on the beaches of Gallipoli and later as the most senior naval officer to be captured at Singapore in 1942.

== Early life ==
George Francis Arthur Mulock was born in Fleetwood, Lancashire on 7 February 1882, the youngest child and only son of Railway Engineer George Phillips Mulock and Clara Frances Lugsdin. A fortnight after George's birth his mother died of complications from childbirth. His father never fully recovered from this personal tragedy and threw himself into his work as resident engineer on the construction of Fleetwood docks.

The young child was taken in by his paternal aunt, Hester Jane, the wife of barrister-turned-journalist and future poet laureate Alfred Austin. At a young age George had determined that he should enter the Royal Navy and the Austins threw themselves into ensuring that this was achieved. In preparation George was despatched to Stanmore Park preparatory school. Austin was approached to assume the post of Poet Laureate, vacant since the death of Alfred, Lord Tennyson; he accepted and ensured that his nephew's naval career would begin in earnest.

=== Early naval career ===
With a personal letter of recommendation from Prime Minister Lord Salisbury and with a subtle hint from the First Sea Lord Admiral Sir Frederick Richards, a place was secured on board the old three-decker HMS Britannia, moored on the River Dart. On 15 January 1896, fourteen-year-old Midshipman George Mulock entered the Royal Navy, probably one of the last midshipman to have secured entry by the age-old practice of patronage.

On 15 October 1897 Mulock was rated midshipman without examination and joined the newly completed battleship Victorious, on her way to join the China Station. This first introduction to eastern culture had a lasting effect upon the young midshipman. The ship made regular visits to Singapore, Shanghai, Wei Hai Wei, Nagasaki and Yokohama 'showing the flag' as one of the newest ships in the fleet.

Returning to England, his postings reflected an aptitude for navigation and pilotage. Mulock had displayed a talent for positioning. In August 1900 he was appointed to the sailing brig HMS Pilot, tender to HMS Impregnable, 'Training ship for boys' at Devonport. Two months later he joined the battleship HMS Magnificent, flagship of Rear-Admiral Albert B. Jenkins, Second-in-Command of the Channel Squadron. Promoted to acting sub-lieutenant on 15 April 1901, he joined the naval college at Greenwich, named HMS Excellent. His next appointment, in April 1902, was to HMS Triton, a paddle-driven surveying vessel attached to the Admiralty Hydrographic Service, where he was able to put to good use his recently acquired knowledge and natural aptitude for pilotage and surveying. At this point he was confirmed as a sub-lieutenant in the Royal Navy, back-dated to April 1901.

== Polar Explorer ==
=== Mulock replaces Shackleton ===
During his time on HMS Triton, newspapers were awash with news that a joint expedition by the Royal Society and the Royal Geographical Society (RGS) under the command of Commander Robert F. Scott, RN would travel to the Southern Continent and attempt to reach the Pole as well as conduct scientific research to ascertain the exact position of the south magnetic pole, allowing the Admiralty to produce conclusive magnetic charts of the region. Mulock's uncle and stepfather Alfred Austin, now Poet Laureate, wrote to Sir Clements Markham at the Royal Geographical Society remarking that his nephew had recently completed a course in HMS Triton and was now highly proficient in underwater survey, cartography, geometry and oceanography. For good measure a copy of the letter found its way to the office of Rear-Admiral Sir William Wharton, the Royal Navy Hydrographer.

Markham, having returned from Norway where he had purchased for £3,380 the ex-whaler Morgenen, now renamed Morning, was eager to despatch a relief ship to support Scott's expedition, which had sailed in August 1901. Markham had managed to raise £22,000, enough capital to fit out the ship. The Admiralty's sole contribution was the loan of two officers, Lt. Edward Evans (who later became well known as Evans of the Broke) and a young sub-lieutenant, the nephew of the Poet Laureate, posted to the ship in late June 1902. Under the command of Captain William Colbeck, a veteran of the "Southern Cross" expedition and a lieutenant in the Royal Naval Reserve, Morning would rendezvous with Discovery in Antarctica, replenish her supplies, and return with despatches. In January 1903 Morning made fast in ice at Hut Point in Antarctica, and on 3 February Mulock met Scott for the first time.

Although Mulock was intended to replace any injured officer, his replacement of Ernest Shackleton in March 1903 caused later historians to suggest a great rift between Scott and Shackleton. The latter's scurvy and exhaustion were key factors, as well as Mulock's obvious talent for survey work. The young officer quickly set to work amassing data for the RGS. Mulock expressed a desire to explore the vast continent rather than spending his time behind a desk aboard Discovery. On 13 September, under the command of Lt. Michael Barne, Mulock, Quartley, Smythe, Crean and Joyce spent a week on the ice travelling to the South West depot to leave supplies. Mulock's next foray to the region almost ended in disaster as a severe weather front moved in close to their position. Joyce's feet were badly frostbitten, and Mulock and Barne alternated rubbing the young man's feet against the pit of their stomachs, saving them from likely amputation.

After almost a year in the ice-bound and frozen wastes of Antarctica, Mulock informed Scott that he had observed the fracturing of ice around Discovery. As the crew assembled for the dedication of a cross to AB George Vince on 16 February 1904, cracking sounds were clearly heard echoing across the ice. With the senior officers dining, newly promoted Lieutenant Mulock was officer of the watch when violent surges indicated that Discovery was beginning to break free of the vice-like grip which had held her fast for over a year. As Discovery edged out from the ice and preparations were made for her voyage home, Mulock was permitted to conduct the first-ever running survey of the Drygalski Ice Tongue. He was awarded the Polar Medal for his work.

=== Return home ===
On Saturday 10 September 1904 Discovery docked at Portsmouth to much acclaim, and while the crew was feted by receptions and banquets celebrating the success of the British National Antarctic Expedition (BNAE), Mulock was informed that the Admiralty had seconded him to the Royal Geographical Society to compile, record logs, evaluate surveys and produce charts of Antarctica for use in the future. In 1908 his monumental work was published by the RGS. In recognition of his diligence and professional attitude towards his work Lieutenant Mulock was elected a Fellow of the Royal Geographical Society and in 1908 awarded him the Back Award.

Scott, Markham and Mulock met to discuss the final names accorded to various Antarctic features. This was to cause some disruption to Mulock's work with the RGS, but necessary before the newly promoted Scott dined with King Edward VII at Balmoral Castle. Scott suggested that a mysterious inlet be named after the expedition surveyor. This seemed minor recognition for the work of the talented Mulock, but Scott suspected that something far more exciting might be there. Subsequent expeditions travelled to the Mulock Inlet and discovered a vast glacier beyond the shoreline. The New Zealand National Antarctic Expedition later named this the Mulock Glacier in recognition of his contribution to Polar exploration.

=== Return to the Royal Navy ===
On 27 February 1906, at an RGS council dinner, Sir Clement Markham presented the Patron's Medal to Scott, and silver medals to Discovery officers. The newly promoted Captain Scott CVO also informed Mulock that in recognition of his dedicated service and the interruption caused to his naval career, he had recommended him for the torpedo course at HMS Vernon, a highly prized qualification in the pre-1914 navy. At Buckingham Palace on 18 December 1906 Lieutenant George Mulock R.N., F.R.G.S was presented to King Edward VII and invested with the Silver Polar Medal.

On his return to the service in March 1907 Mulock joined the torpedo course at HMS Vernon. Shortly before Scott had invited Mulock to join him on a second polar expedition; the young lieutenant accepted without hesitation. Then Ernest Shackleton wrote to him inviting him to participate in the Nimrod Expedition. Due to the gentleman's agreement with Scott, Mulock declined but unintentionally sparked off a rivalry by revealing to Shackleton that Scott was planning to "go south again"; it came as no surprise that in April 1908 Mulock failed to qualify as a torpedo lieutenant. Commodore J. Briggs, RN, commanding Vernon, recorded on Mulock's official service record that "his failure to qualify in torpedo was due to his inattention", a clear rebuke for the efforts of Scott and Shackleton. In 1908 Mulock was appointed to HMS Achilles (Captain Henry Oliver, RN) in preparation for a command of his own.

The following year, aged 26, Lieutenant George Mulock was piped aboard the destroyer HMS Hunter as captain. A member of the trio of Handy-class destroyers, Hunter had been launched over a decade before in December 1895, but her Fairfield-built engines still provided 4,000 horsepower (3,000 kW) and gave her a top speed of 27 knots (50 km/h; 31 mph). Following a year's service with the Home Fleet, Mulock took command of the 320-ton shallow-draft river gunboat HMS Woodlark, serving with the China Station on the Yangtse and West rivers.

The expansion of the Naval Intelligence Department at the Admiralty in 1909, created openings for promising officers; for the third time in his career Mulock was seconded out, this time to Naval Intelligence. In June 1911 he returned to command Woodlark. In quick succession in 1913, Mulock commanded the destroyers HMS Stag, Mallard and Jed.

== First World War (1914–18) ==
=== Gallipoli ===
During the opening phase of the First World War Mulock safely conducted a convoy to the Far East, receiving a letter of commendation. As an acting Commander in 1915, Mulock was temporarily relieved of his command of HMS Jed when it was discovered that he had made little effort to conceal the confidential nature of the despatches entrusted to his care. In March 1915, whilst serving on the staff of Admiral John de Robeck, Mulock was stationed in the Dardanelles and witnessed first-hand the plight of the Canopus-class battleship HMS Ocean, which sank after hitting a mine. Using his initiative he quickly secured passage in Jed, and, with accompanying launches, rescued sailors from the water. For his prompt action he was mentioned in despatches. Transferred to the staff of the Principal Naval Transport Officer (PNTO) in August 1915, he was appointed Chief Assistant to Captain C.M. Staveley, RN and, as the London Gazette recorded, was "largely responsible for the evacuation of the great quantity of war materials and animals and for the distribution of forces from landing craft at Cape Helles and Suvla Bay".

Both he and Captain Staveley are mentioned in the despatches of Vice-Admiral John de Robeck in "commendation of the successful carrying out of the naval programme and plans". de Robeck informed Mulock that he had been awarded the Distinguished Service Order (London Gazette 14.03.1916). With the returning battleship Prince George lacking a commander, Mulock returned as its executive officer. His promotion to Commander was confirmed in June 1916. His next appointment was as executive officer of the cruiser HMS Southampton, overseeing her refit of battle damage received at the Battle of Jutland.

=== The Mesopotamia campaign ===
Naval intelligence expressed a desire for Commander Mulock to return to the China Station, but the Admiralty, displeased at interference in its command authority, dragged their feet in replying. In January 1917 Mulock was given command of the Fly-class river gunboat HMS Sawfly, serving on the Tigris River in Mesopotamia. During this appointment he was informed that his half-brother Flight-Lieutenant Henry Collister Mulock of the Royal Flying Corps had been shot down and killed while flying over the Somme in France.

Mulock was placed in temporary command of Fly-class gunboat HMS Firefly by the Senior Naval Officer in theatre on 4 March 1917. (On 4 March 1917 he was notified that he had been appointed to command the Aubrietia-class sloop HMS Tulip, but he never took command: while operating in the Atlantic as the Q-ship Q.12 she was torpedoed on 30 April 1917 by the German submarine U-62, and sank under tow from HMS Daffodil the following day.)

On 4 December 1917 he was appointed in command of the Insect-class gunboat HMS Bee, transferred to the Tigris Flotilla from the Mediterranean. Bee, which had been serving upriver of Baghdad, returned to Basra on 26 December 1917. Early in 1918 Bee was transferred to the China Station to reinforce the Yangtse Flotilla.

=== Retirement ===
With the prospect of a position with the Asiatic Petroleum division of Royal Dutch Shell as its Marine Superintendent in Shanghai, and an opportunity to continue to assist Naval Intelligence, Mulock agreed to ask to be placed on the retirement list. On 6 January 1920 Commander George Mulock, DSO, RN, FRGS relinquished command of Bee after two years.

In a secondary role, the commander found himself working for the British Secret Service, relaying information on the Treaty Port at Shanghai, as well as Chinese troop movements and various warships visiting the port. Reporting to the Secret Service and the Commander-in-Chief, China Station, Mulock, although no longer a serving naval officer, was never far from the fleet. His association with the revered Scott of the Antarctic made him something of a talking point in Shanghai society, and he was never short of a dinner invitation. Mulock was informed in 1927 that he was to be advanced to the rank of captain on the retired list. Settled into the rather mundane life in a Chinese Treaty Port, Mulock was soon aware of the increased military traffic generated by forces of the Empire of Japan. Throughout the 1930s Captain Mulock relayed information to London, reporting on troop movements, ships, diplomatic couriers, and related developments.

When the Japanese attacked the Shanghai for a second time in 1937, doctors aboard a Royal Navy ship informed Mulock that he must return home because of a duodenal ulcer, adding that he would also benefit from a few days of medical observation. The decision had very little to do with his medical condition, it was a ruse to provide Mulock with an excuse to leave China and return to the UK carrying important information for the Foreign Office and the Admiralty, and papers from the British representatives. The growing unease with which the British in the various treaty ports were viewing the activities of the Empire of Japan was becoming a matter of concern. With the increasing threat of war with Germany looming, key military and naval personnel in the Far East were quickly recognising the danger of having to potentially fight a war on a second front.

== Second World War (1939–45) ==
=== Singapore 1939–41 ===
Promoted to captain while he was on the retired list in 1927, Mulock was recalled by the Admiralty in the summer of 1939. He left the UK in late August 1939 aboard the British-India Steam Navigation Company liner HMT Dunera, chartered as a troopship to transport personnel to the Far East. While traversing the Suez Canal the passengers heard that war had been declared. Upon arrival in Singapore, Mulock joined the Pool of Officers at the Singapore Naval Base in Sembawang, Singapore. At this time the principal concern was the operations of German raiders in the Pacific Ocean and China Sea. These ships had created havoc in the last war, and this would be the primary focus of naval forces in the region until the entry of Japan into the war in December 1941. The administrative base for Singapore was under the overall command of Rear Admiral Drew RN as Rear Admiral Malaya (RAMY), a sub-command of the soon-to-be-discontinued Commander-in-Chief, China Station. During the early months of the war Singapore was under the overall command of Admiral Sir Percy Noble RN, who was superseded by Vice-Admiral Sir Geoffrey Layton in September 1940.

=== Extended Defences (XDO, Fort Canning) ===
In late September 1939 Captain Mulock was appointed Extended Defences Officer (XDO) for Fort Canning and Head of Extended Defences, Singapore. The official designation of this post was as supervisory office for the extensive minefields surrounding Singapore Island. In addition, XDO was to maintain the minefields, co-ordinate visual reports between the various Post War Signal Stations (PWSS), dotted around the Singapore coastline. XDO would then further co-ordinate between the coastal batteries, the 15" gun emplacements through Commander, Fixed Defences. The Office of the XDO was further augmented by a secondary, more secretive role, as yet fully undetermined. The XDO office was run from a number of places in Singapore including Fort Canning, the Singapore Naval Base, HMS Laburnum (the old sloop moored at Telok Ayer) and deep beneath Fort Canning in the infamous The Battle Box underground complex. The XDO Division operated a 24-hour continuous watch system headed by Captain Mulock with the assistance of his naval secretary. Each watch was supervised by a Lieutenant RNVR and a number of ratings specialising in coding, cyphers and communications. At the time of the outbreak of war in the Far East the XDO Division was still not fully manned and it was not until the sinking of HMS Prince of Wales that the staff was augmented by survivors from the doomed ship.

When Force Z was sunk off Malaya in December 1941, Captain Mulock and his secretary, Lieutenant D.J. Copley RNR, were with Air Chief Marshal Sir Robert Brooke-Popham at Fort Canning. The news was shocking and Lieutenant Copley would later recall that Brooke-Popham just buried his head in his hands.

With the loss of Force Z and the invasion of Malaya underway, Captain Mulock was asked to take over the vacant position of Captain AV (Captain, Auxiliary Vessels), maintaining and operating a small fleet of vessels pressed into service. Many of the ships were old tramp steamers, coasters and similar vessels, hastily retrofitted for wartime service. The Singapore Naval Base, despite its reputation, had one glaring weakness: a lack of ships. These small craft soon began carrying out sweeps along the eastern and western coasts of Malaya and through the Johore Straits around Singapore Island.

From his office at the Singapore Naval Base and through his contacts with Naval Intelligence it was abundantly clear to Captain Mulock that the colony would soon fall. Rear-Admiral E J Spooner DSO, RN quickly re-focused his attentions to the evacuation of key personnel from the colony and the destruction of all facilities which could conceivably be utilised by the Japanese. Captain Mulock and his staff at Extended Defences, under the indirect command of Rear-Admiral Spooner, co-ordinated the systematic evacuation of some sixteen vessels which sailed from Singapore at dawn on 12 February, or 'Black Friday' as it would later be known. At 9am on the 12th Mulock and other key military figures attended a conference at Fort Canning chaired by the Admiral. During the conference it was decided that key military personnel would be evacuated, and passes were divided between the various department heads, to be distributed amongst younger technical personnel, but not themselves. If the allotted figure could not be reached any remaining passes were to be given to women and children.

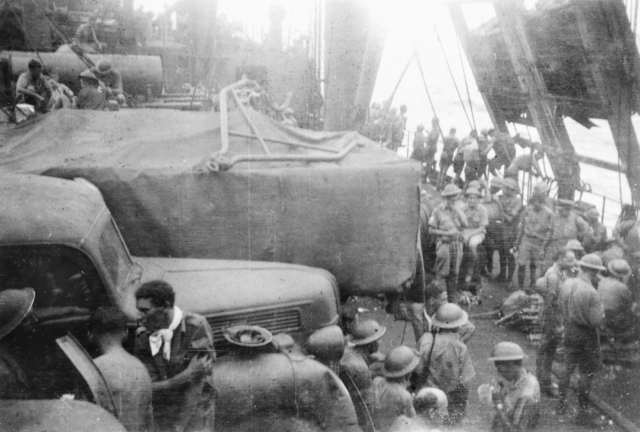
Troops and RAF equipment crowded aboard Empire Star in the evacuation of Singapore, 12 February 1942

The exact size of the so-called "Empire Star Convoy" is unknown and numbers range from six to over thirty, but included the Empire Star, Gorgon, Yoma and Delamore. The light cruiser HMS Durban, the destroyer Stronghold and two converted civilian vessels, the minesweeper HMS Scott Harley and anti-submarine vessel HMS Kedah, would escort the convoy. It is estimated that only two or three of the dozens of ships to leave Singapore during 11–13 February 1942 actually made it to safety.

Three ships that Captain Mulock personally oversaw the evacuation of were the Blue Star Line refrigerated cargo ship Empire Star (which left on 12 February), Vyner Brooke (left on the night of 12 February), and Malacca (left on the morning of 13 February). Empire Star was one of two from the first flotilla not to be sunk by the Japanese. Many of the officers and ratings from Mulock's department, Extended Defences, were evacuated in the convoy.

Rear-Admiral Spooner had decided on 12 February that, before his own evacuation the following day, any seaworthy ship left in Keppel Harbour should sail for Java that night. With an estimated capacity of 3,000 evacuees, this would probably be the last opportunity to evacuate the military and civilian population. The criterion for obtaining passage depended on status level if a civilian or if military level of technical specialisation essential to continuing the war effort.

Having witnessed first-hand the brutality displayed by the Japanese in Shanghai during the 1930s, Captain Mulock was determined to evacuate as many civilians and officials as was possible. He was frustrated to see ships leaving the port half full in the weeks leading up to the surrender and then grossly overloaded, as the situation became more volatile. Not only did he assume responsibility for evacuating civilians without documentation, but he also arranged the evacuation of key military, intelligence and diplomatic personnel from the colony, including the few remaining members of his own staff. He personally organised the evacuation of Rear-Admiral E J Spooner aboard the motor launch ML 310. Spooner and Air Vice Marshal C.W.H. Pulford (Air Officer Commanding, Singapore) were seen off by General Percival. Pulford said to Percival upon his departure "I suppose you and I will be held responsible for this but God knows we did our best with what little we had been given".

=== The Flight of the Mary Rose (14–17 February 1942) ===
Resigned to his fate as one of the very few remaining naval officers in Singapore, at 2200 hrs on the evening of 14 February, Captain Mulock was ordered to report to the office of Lieutenant-General Arthur Percival (G.O.C., Singapore) at Fort Canning, where he was informed that personnel, hand-picked selected by the governor-general and by Percival himself, were awaiting evacuation. The Captain was ordered to requisition the motor launches Osprey and Mary Rose, and convey key Australian diplomatic, Malayan Civil Service and Special Branch personnel to safety. The Osprey was designed to seat ten persons, but when the party arrived it numbered nearly forty. At the party's head Australian Official Representative Vivian Gordon Bowden CBE, and his staff. Bowden had refused all requests to leave, but on Percival's urging he finally decided to leave.

The group was confronted on the quayside by a mob of Australian deserters armed with Thompson submachine guns and hand grenades. The party, led by Captain Mulock, was able to make its way onto the Osprey, but the deserters opened fire and machine-gunned the launch. There were no casualties, and after a foiled attempt by the deserters to board the launch, some 38 people were ferried out to the Mary Rose at 2330 hrs on 14 February 1942. The Mary Rose, a 40 feet (12 m) motor launch, was one of the last vessels to leave the colony.

Captain Mulock took with him six Malay seamen from HMS Sultan. Amongst the launch's 38 passengers were Mr Vivian Gordon Bowden (Australian Official Representative in Singapore), Mr Alfred Wootton (Commercial Secretary) Mr John Quinn (Political Secretary), Lt. Colonel John Dalley of Dalforce and five of his officers, Lt Colonel H.L. Hill OBE (4/19th Hyderabad, Indian Army), Major K.S. Morgan (Head of Singapore Special Branch), Captain Charles Corry (Malayan Civil Service), Chief Superintendent M. L. Wynne (Assistant Chief of Police, Singapore) Head of Special Branch.

=== Prisoner of War (1942–45) ===
On the evening of 16 February 1942 Mary Rose, en route for Bangka, was illuminated by searchlights from two Japanese patrol vessels in the Muntok Strait beyond the Moesi River, who threatened to open fire on the launch. Captain Mulock refused to surrender, but a close warning shot across the bows forced him to reconsider. In the absence of a white flag, a pair of underpants was found amongst a passenger's luggage and hoisted. An English-speaking Japanese officer came aboard and Captain Mulock offered his sword to the officer, thus became the last Royal Navy captain to surrender his sword to the enemy.

The vessel was escorted to Muntok harbour on Bangka Island where the Mary Rose's occupants were taken ashore as prisoners of war. Captain Mulock and his Malay sailors remained aboard until the Imperial Japanese Navy came for them.

The prisoners were held in a cinema-hall at Muntok where Commissioner V G Bowden told his captors in their own language of his diplomatic status and remonstrated with guards who attempted to remove his personal possessions. Soldiers punched him and dragged him outside, and he was later executed.

There remains some confusion as to what happened over the course of the next few days but Captain Mulock was next seen under escort at Muntok, with the officer to whom he surrendered his sword being taken to a waiting craft. Behind him his luggage was being carried by Japanese ratings! There is evidence to suggest he returned to Singapore in the Japanese cruiser Sendai, known to be in the region at the time.

On 19 February 1942 the Imperial Japanese Navy returned Captain Mulock to Singapore as the most senior surviving staff officer and he was forced to witness the handover of the Singapore Naval Base to the IJN. Imprisoned in Changi Prison, he joined the Senior Officers party, which included General Percival, army officers above the rank of colonel and Naval officers above the rank of Commander, who were shipped to Taiwan.

As a POW, Captain Mulock was held at Karenko and Shirakawa where he shared a cell with Sir Mark Aitchison Young, the Governor of Hong Kong, before being relocated briefly to Japan aboard the infamous hell-ship, the Oryoku Maru. Later he and others were sent to Manchuria, to a camp near the town of Mukden, where they were liberated by Soviet troops in August 1945. He was so frail by this time that he was airlifted to Calcutta for medical treatment.

== Later life ==
Once he had recuperated from his time as a POW, Captain Mulock returned to Singapore on the staff of the newly created Flag Officer, Malaya. His primary duties were compiling information on the casualties, missing, killed and unknown deaths from Singapore and Malaya. These included discovering the fate of Admiral Spooner. These records were subsequently handed over to the Commonwealth War Graves Commission. Captain Mulock also gave evidence at the post-war War Crimes Trials in Hong Kong. He retired in late 1946 to South Africa where he bought land and took up bee-keeping. He later moved to Malaga in Spain, where he spent the rest of his life. He died in hospital in Gibraltar on 26 December 1963 aged 81.

== George Mulock in popular culture ==
In March 2012, at the premiere of the screenplay of Reynold's Cargo, a wartime drama, based on the civilian evacuations from Singapore, the character of a naval captain called Mulock was portrayed by Glenn Hazeldine. The drama written by Sydney-based writer Carolyn Anderson is a fictional account, though heavily influenced by historical fact. The protagonist, William Reynolds, a disgraced former naval officer, leads a boat full of civilians to safety while the Japanese pursue.

== Honours and awards ==
=== Military ===
- Distinguished Service Order
- 1914–15 Star
- British War Medal
- Victory Medal
- 1939–1945 Star
- Pacific Star
- Defence Medal
- War Medal 1939–1945
- King George V Coronation Medal, 1911
- King George V Silver Jubilee Medal, 1935
- King George VI Coronation Medal, 1937
- Queen Elizabeth II Coronation Medal, 1952

=== Scientific ===
- Polar Medal
- Fellow of the Royal Geographical Society
- The RGS Back Award

== Works ==
- The Charts of the Discovery Antarctic Expedition by Lieutenant G.F.A. Mulock RN, FRGS (Royal Geographical Society, 1908)

== See also ==
- Mulock inlet
- Mulock Glacier
- Sir William Mulock
- Redford Henry Mulock
- Alfred Austin

== Bibliography ==
- White Ribbon, White Flag: The Life & Times of Captain G.F.A. Mulock DSO, RN. The Review journal of the Naval Historical Collectors & Research Association by Robert Hughes-Mullock FRAS (Edition 19.2, 2006)
- The Story of Mulock: The Pedigree of the Mulock Family of Ireland by Sir Edmund Thomas Bewley (Ponsonby & Gibbs, 1905)
- By Virtue & Faith: A History of the Mulock & Mullock Families by Robert Hughes-Mullock FRAS (2012)
- Polar Record (Obituaries) : Vol. XII, No. 77 (Cambridge, 1964)
- Womack, Tom (2015). The Allied Defense of the Malay Barrier, 1941-1942. Jefferson NC: McFarland & Company. ISBN 978-1-47666-293-0.
