= Yamagata =

Yamagata may refer to:

== Places ==
=== Japan ===
- Yamagata Prefecture, a prefecture of Japan in the Tōhoku region on Honshu island
  - Yamagata, Yamagata, the capital city of Yamagata Prefecture
  - Yamagata Airport (IATA code GAJ), an airport located in Yamagata
  - Yamagata Shinkansen, one of Shinkansen lines running between Tokyo Station and Shinjo Station
  - Yamagata Station, the main train station of Yamagata City
- Yamagata, Gifu, a city in Gifu Prefecture
- Yamagata, Nagano, a village in Higashichikuma District, Nagano, Japan
- Yamagata, Iwate, a village in Iwate Prefecture
- Yamagata District, Hiroshima, a district in Hiroshima Prefecture
- Yamagata District, Gifu, a former district of Gifu Prefecture
- Yamagata, Ibaraki, a city in Ibaraki Prefecture
- Yamagata Domain, a Japanese feudal domain in Dewa Province

=== Antarctica ===
- Yamagata Ridge, a nunatak in Oates Land, Antarctica

== Other uses ==
- Yamagata (surname)
- 7039 Yamagata, a main-belt asteroid
- Montedio Yamagata, a J. League club based in Yamagata Prefecture
- Yamagata (Akira), a fictional character in the anime film Akira
- B/Yamagata, lineage of Betainfluenzavirus
