= Soyuz-17 Cliff =

Soyuz-17 Cliff (79°31′S 159°8′E) is a prominent rock cliff, 3.5 nautical miles (6 km) long, on the north side of Carlyon Glacier in the Cook Mountains. The cliff is 4 nautical miles (7 km) west-northwest of Cape Murray and rises to c. 500 metres (1,600 ft). Named after the Soviet spacecraft Soyuz 17 of January 17, 1975.
