= Yoshida Bluff =

Yoshida Bluff (79°20′S 158°12′E) is a flat-topped bluff which rises to 2000 m at the north side of the head of Carlyon Glacier in Cook Mountains. The bluff is midway between Mill Mountain and Kanak Peak and is ice-covered except for rock cliffs at the south and west sides. Named after Yoshio Yoshida of the National Institute of Polar Research, Japan, geochemist with Japanese Antarctic Research Expedition (JARE) in four field seasons in the McMurdo Dry Valleys, 1963–64 to 1973–74.
