= Nepal Peak =

Nepal Peak may refer to:

== Places ==
- Nepal Peak (Antarctica)
- Nepal Peak (Himalayas)
