= Lankester =

Lankester is an English surname. Notable people with the name include:

- Edwin Lankester (1814–1874), English surgeon and naturalist
- Ray Lankester (1847–1929), British zoologist
- Tim Lankester (born 1942), British civil servant and college president
- Lankester Merrin (1890s-1970s), a fictional character in The Exorcist (novel) (1971), and one of the two main protagonists in the 1973 film adaptation, and several sequel films

== See also ==
- Cape Lankester, in the Antarctic
- Lankester Botanical Garden, a public garden in Costa Rica
