= Bromwich (disambiguation) =

Bromwich may refer to:

Places

- West Bromwich, Metropolitan Borough of Sandwell, West Midlands, England
  - West Bromwich (constituency)
- Castle Bromwich, Metropolitan Borough of Solihull, West Midlands, England
- East Bromwich, a fictional place

People

- Andrew Bromwich (c.1640–1702), English Roman Catholic priest
- David Bromwich, American academic
- David H. Bromwich, American meteorologist
- Jesse Bromwich (born 1989), New Zealand rugby league player
- John Bromwich (1918–1999), Australian tennis player
- Kenny Bromwich (born 1991), New Zealand rugby league player
- Michael R. Bromwich (born 1953), United States Department of the Interior official
- Rachel Bromwich (1915–2010), British linguist
- Thomas John I'Anson Bromwich (1875–1929), English mathematician

Sports

- West Bromwich Albion F.C., English Football Club
