= Goorkha Craters =

Line of snow-free coastal hills In Antarctica

The Goorkha Craters (79°45′S 159°34′E) are a line of snow-free coastal hills 5 nautical miles (9 km) long, standing 2 nautical miles (4 km) east of Cooper Nunatak between Carlyon Glacier and Darwin Glacier in Antarctica. They were discovered and named by the British National Antarctic Expedition (1901–04).
