= Nepal Peak (Antarctica) =

Mountain in Antarctica

Nepal Peak (79°43′S 159°35′E) is a peak, in Antarctica. It is 1,203 m (3,947 ft) high, at the north end of Goorkha Craters, Cook Mountains. Named by Advisory Committee on Antarctic Names (US-ACAN) in association with Goorkha Craters (Gurkha), a name applied by R.F. Scott, 1901–04.
