= Murayama Crests =

Murayama Crests (79°12′S 158°34′E) is a group of about four peaks or nunataks, the highest rising to 2020 m, located 4 nautical miles (7 km) north-northeast of Kanak Peak in Cook Mountains. Named after Haruta Murayama, Yokohama National University, Japan, geochemist with Japanese Antarctic Research Expedition (JARE) in the McMurdo Dry Valleys during the 1981–82 field season.
