= Raytheon Polar Services Company =

Division of Raytheon

- Industry: Polar Region Logistics and Resources
- Defunct: March 30, 2012
- Fate: Dissolved
- Headquarters: United States
- Area served: Antarctica and Antarctic waters
- Parent: Raytheon

Raytheon Polar Services Company (RPSC) was a division of Raytheon that provided logistics, operations, and staffing for the National Science Foundation's operations in Antarctica and Antarctic waters. Its contract with the United States Antarctic Program expired on March 30, 2012.

== Operational role ==
The US Antarctic Program Participant Guide lists RPSC's role in Antarctica as the following:

- Supporting science and operating research labs
- Procuring, arranging for transport, warehousing, and issuing equipment and supplies
- Operating and maintaining stations, research vessels, and numerous field camps
- Arranging medical clearance and travel of parties
- Managing transportation of passengers and cargo
- Arranging annual resupply and fuel of McMurdo by Military Sealift Command contract ships
- Providing marine terminal operations
- Complying with safety, health, and environmental requirements

Raytheon Polar Services operates the Antarctic Fire Department.

== Criticism ==
Raytheon Polar Services Company has been criticized for failing to cooperate fully in New Zealand's investigation of Rodney Marks's death. Marks died in 2000 from methanol poisoning while working at the Amundsen–Scott South Pole Station. New Zealand police and the coroner, Richard McElrea, said Raytheon and the National Science Foundation failed to provide full and prompt information to the authorities. New Zealand police believe there was a private U.S. investigation into the death, which the U.S. organizations refused to disclose.

In 2007, two employees of Raytheon had to be evacuated from the South Pole Station after one broke the other's jaw in a "drunken Christmas punch-up".
