= Finger Ridges =

ins
- Location within Antarctica

Highest point
- Coordinates: 79°11′S 157°0′E

Geography
- Continent: Antarctica
- Range coordinates: 79°25′S 158°00′E
- Parent range: Cook Mountains

The Finger Ridges (79°11′S 157°0′E) are several mainly ice-free ridges and spurs extending over a distance of about 12 miles (20 km), east–west, in the northwestern part of the Cook Mountains in Antarctica.

== Location ==
The Finger Ridges are in the northwest of the Cook Mountains, to the east of Butcher Ridge, north of Harvey Peak and west of Henry Mesa. The highest points on the main ridge are about 2,050 metres (6,730 ft). The individual ridges are 1 to 2 miles (1.6 to 3.2 km) long and project northward from the higher main ridge. They were mapped by the United States Geological Survey from tellurometer surveys and Navy air photos, 1959–63, and named descriptively by the Advisory Committee on Antarctic Names.

== Features ==
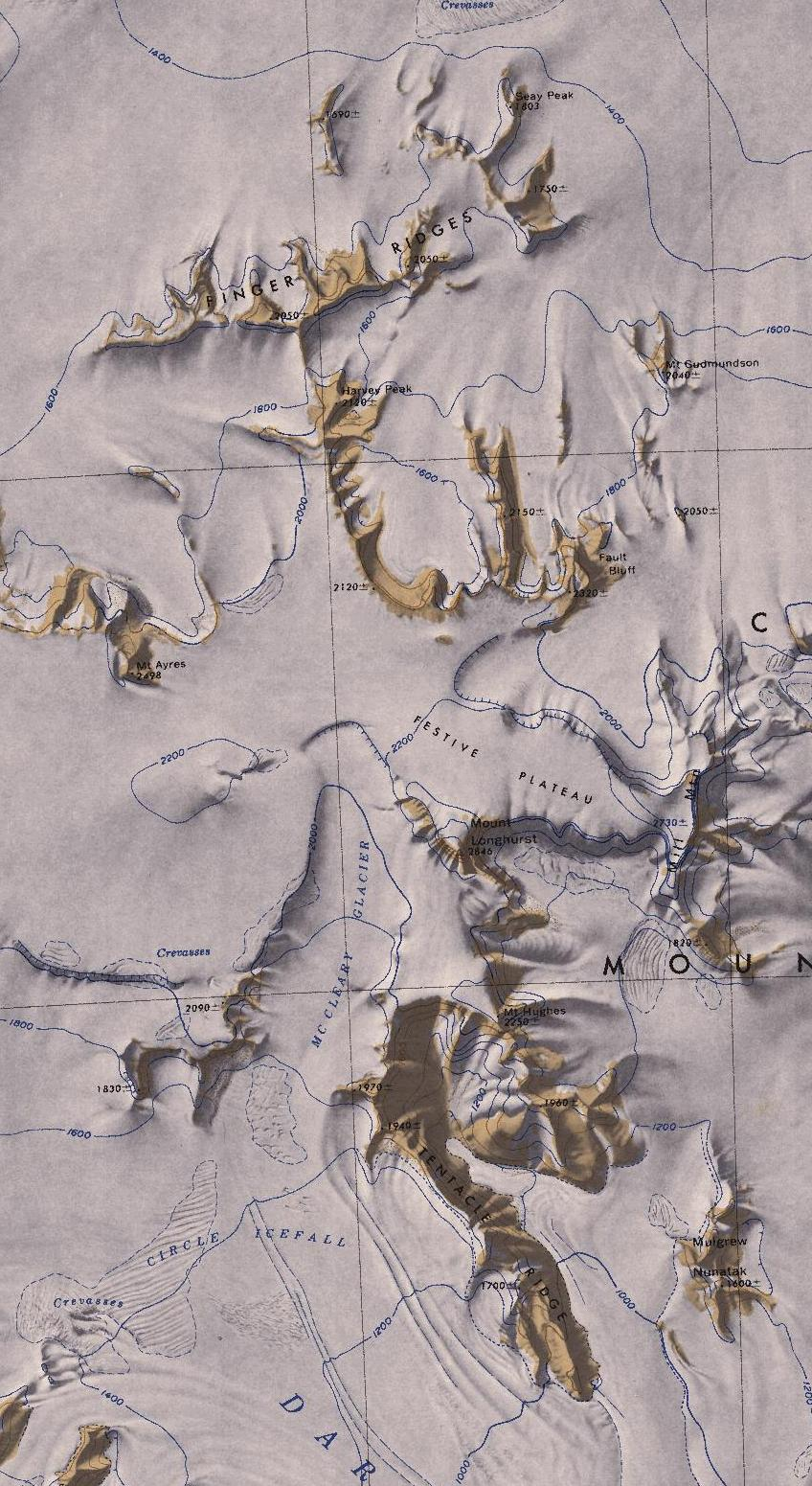
Western Cook Mountains. Finger Ridges to the north.

=== Harper Ridge ===
79°9′S 156°57′E. A nearly ice-free ridge in Antarctica, 2 nautical miles (4 km) long and rising to over 1,800 metres (5,900 ft). It extends north from the central part of the Finger Ridges, toward Yamagata Ridge. It was named after Doyal A. Harper of the University of Chicago Yerkes Observatory, Williams Bay, Wisconsin, director of the Center for Astrophysical Research in Antarctica at South Pole Station for several years from 1991.

=== Seay Peak ===
79°05′S 157°30′E. Pointed ice-free peak, 1,805 metres (5,922 ft) high, the northeasternmost summit in the Finger Ridges. Mapped by the USGS from tellurometer surveys and Navy air photos, 1959–63. Named by US-ACAN for Benny F. Seay, a member of the U.S. Army aviation support unit for Topo North and Topo South (1961–62) which conducted the tellurometer surveys.

== Sources ==
- Alberts, Fred G., ed. (1995), Geographic Names of the Antarctic (PDF) (2 ed.), United States Board on Geographic Names This article incorporates public domain material from websites or documents of the United States Board on Geographic Names.
- Carlyon Glacier, USGS United States Geologic Survey, 1960
- "Harper Ridge", Geographic Names Information System, United States Geological Survey, United States Department of the Interior
