= Antarctic Submillimeter Telescope and Remote Observatory =

Radio telescope

- Alternative names: AST/RO
- Part of: Amundsen–Scott South Pole Station
- Location: Antarctica
- Coordinates: 89°59′40″S 45°53′00″W
- Altitude: 2,847 m (9,341 ft)
- Wavelength: 0.2 mm (1.5 THz)–2.0 mm (150 GHz)
- First light: January 1995
- Decommissioned: December 2005
- Diameter: 1.7 m (5 ft 7 in)
- Location within Antarctica

Antarctic Submillimeter Telescope and Remote Observatory, or AST/RO, was a 1.7 meter diameter off-axis telescope for research in astronomy and aeronomy at wavelengths between 0.2 and 2 mm. The instrument operated between 1994 and 2005 at the South Pole with four heterodyne receivers and three acousto-optical spectrometers. It was replaced by the 10-m South Pole Telescope.

AST/RO operated as part of the Center for Astrophysical Research in Antarctica (CARA), an NSF Science and Technology Center. It was funded in 1989 by the NSF Office of Polar Programs after a successful proposal by A. A. Stark, J. Bally, and R. W. Wilson of AT&T Bell Laboratories, T. M. Bania and A. P. Lane of Boston University, and K.-Y. Lo of the University of Illinois.

AST/RO was the first radio telescope on the Antarctica plateau to operate throughout the year. As such, it has played a pioneering role in testing instrumentation, characterizing the site, and developing protocols that have paved the way for newer telescopes to exploit the South Pole: the best location on Earth for observations in the submillimeter band.

== Telescope and instruments ==
The AST/RO telescope was located on the roof of a single story support building 20m long and 4m wide. To reduce the buildup of snow drifts, the building was mounted on steel columns raising it to an elevation of 3m above the icecap. The AST/RO building was located in the so called Dark Sector of the Amundsen Scott South Pole Station. This is an area located about 1km from the living facilities to ensure it has low light and radio noise pollution, even by South Pole standards. The AST/RO building was divided into six rooms. All receivers the participated in AST/RO observations, were mounted on an optical table suspended from the telescope in a Coudé room. In general, virtually all equipment was located inside the support building and thus was protected from the harsh climate. The AST/RO building consumed an average of 24kW of power that was supplied by the powerplant at the station.

The telescope had an alt-azimuth mounting and a 1.7m primary reflector. It had an offset optical design providing a clean radio beam and allowing the mounting of large receivers in a warm Coudé room protected from the harsh external environment. At 492 GHz, it had a beamsize of 96 arc seconds, big enough for large-scale mapping programs but still able to observe nearby galaxies. The beam reflected off a Gregorian secondary to a flat tertiary mirror with a fourth flat mirror directing it to a Coudé focus below the telescope (in the AST/RO building) along the azimuth axis. AST/RO also had a Nasymth focus accessed by the removal of the fourth mirror.

Over its lifetime, AST/RO observed with five heterodyne receivers. These receivers operated at 230 GHz, 450-495 GHz (two), 800-820 GHz, and an array of four 800-820 GHz. AST/RO was able to process seven intermediate-frequency bandpasses using acousto-optical spectrometers. These included two low resolution spectrometers with a 1 GHz bandwidth, an array of four low-resolution spectrometer channels with a 1 GHz bandwidth, and a high-resolution spectrometer with a 60 MHz bandwidth.

== Science ==
AST/RO was designed to carry out the first survey of the southern Galactic Plane, high-latitude clouds, and the Magellanic Clouds in the emission lines of neutral atomic carbon (CI) at 492 and 809 GHz. In its early years, observations focused on site characterization at 492 and 230 GHz. Regular sky dips at 492 GHz demonstrated that the South Pole is the best submillimeter-wave observatory site on Earth.

Notable scientific achievements of AST/RO include:

- Mapping dense molecular gas in star-forming regions of the Magellanic clouds.
- Multifrequency study of the properties of interstellar star-forming clouds and their interactions with HII regions and supernovae.
- Determination of the thermodynamic state of dense gas within the central few kiloparsecs of the Milky Way.
- Physical state of high-latitude (out of the plane of the Milky Way) translucent molecular clouds.
- Terahertz detection of N II and its mapping in the Eta Carina region.

== See also ==
- List of astronomical observatories
- Lists of telescopes
- Rodney Marks (astrophysicist)
