= Carol Finn =

American geophysicist

Carol A. Finn is an American geophysicist. She served as president of the American Geophysical Union from 2013 to 2016. She is an elected fellow of the Geological Society of America and previously worked at the U.S. Geological Survey. She had the Finn Spur named after her.
