= Felder Peak =

Mountain in Antarctica

Felder Peak (79°33′S 157°0′E) is a rock peak rising to 1,970 metres (6,460 ft) between the terminus of McCleary Glacier and the west side of Starbuck Cirque in the Cook Mountains of Antarctica. It was named after Robert P. Felder of the Institute of Polar Studies and Department of Geology and Mineralogy, Ohio State University, who, with Gunter Faure, made geological investigations in the nearby Brown Hills, 1978–79.
