= Worcester Range =

Mountain Range in Antarctica

- Location within Antarctica

Highest point
- Peak: Mount Harmsworth
- Elevation: 2,765 m (9,072 ft)
- Prominence: 1,466 m (4,810 ft)
- Listing: Ribu

Geography
- Continent: Antarctica
- Region: Hillary Coast
- Range coordinates: 78°50′S 161°00′E
- Parent range: Transantarctic Mountains

The Worcester Range (78°50′S 161°00′E) is a high coastal range, about 30 nautical miles (56 km; 35 mi) long, in Antarctica. It stands between Skelton Glacier and Mulock Glacier on the western side of the Ross Ice Shelf. It is southwest of the Royal Society Range and north of the Conway Range of the Cook Mountains.

== Exploration and naming ==
The Worcester Range was probably named after the training ship in the Thames, in which many officers of early British Antarctic expeditions trained. It was discovered by the British National Antarctic Expedition (BrNAE), 1901–04. The name seems to have been first applied on the charts of the British Antarctic Expedition, 1907–09.

== Location ==
The range is part of the Prince Albert-McMurdo Range, which also includes the Prince Albert Mountains, in the Victoria Land region of New Zealand's Ross Dependency claim. These ranges are part of the larger Transantarctic Mountains, which span the continent.

The Worcester Range is bounded to the east by the Skelton Glacier, which flows south to the Ross Ice Shelf from the Skelton Névé to the northwest. There are scattered peaks and nunataks in the ice-covered land to the west. The Mulock Glacier flows in a southeast direction to the ice cap, defining the southern boundary of the range. Cape Timberlake is the southeast tip of the range, between Evteev Glacier and Skelton Glacier. Cape Teall is the southwest tip of the range, where Evteev Glacier meets Mulock Glacier.

== Glaciers ==
Glaciers flowing from the range into Skelton Glacier include, from north to south, Delta Glacier ending south of Delta Bluff, Dilemma Glacier, Ant Hill Glacier, ending south of Ant Hill and north of Bareface Bluff, Mason Glacier ending south of Bareface Bluff, and Evteev Glacier, flowing from south of The Podium past Cape Timberlake. The Kehle Glacier forms to the southwest of Mount Speyer and flows southwest to enter Mulock Glacier.

== Features ==
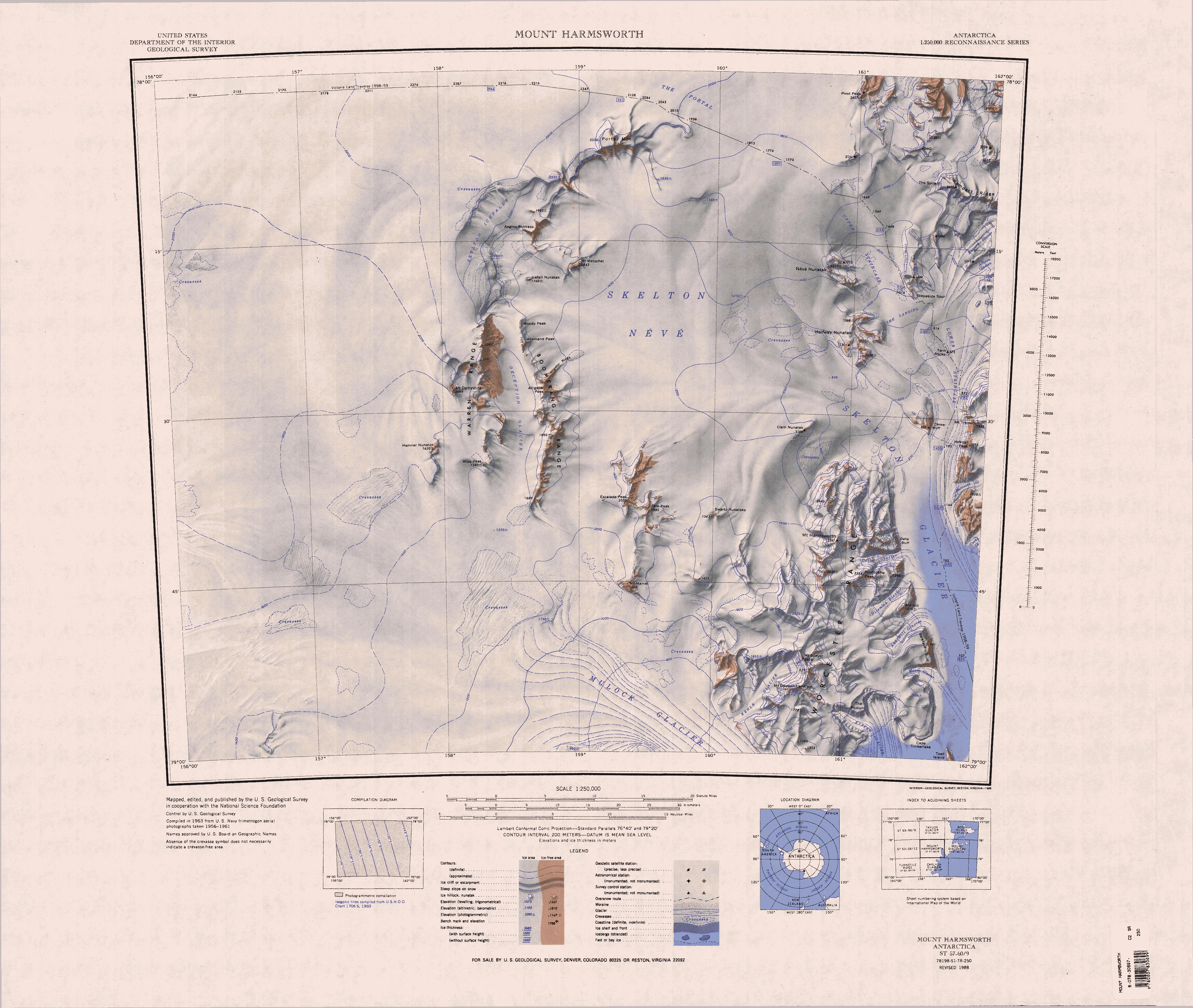
Worcester Range in southeast

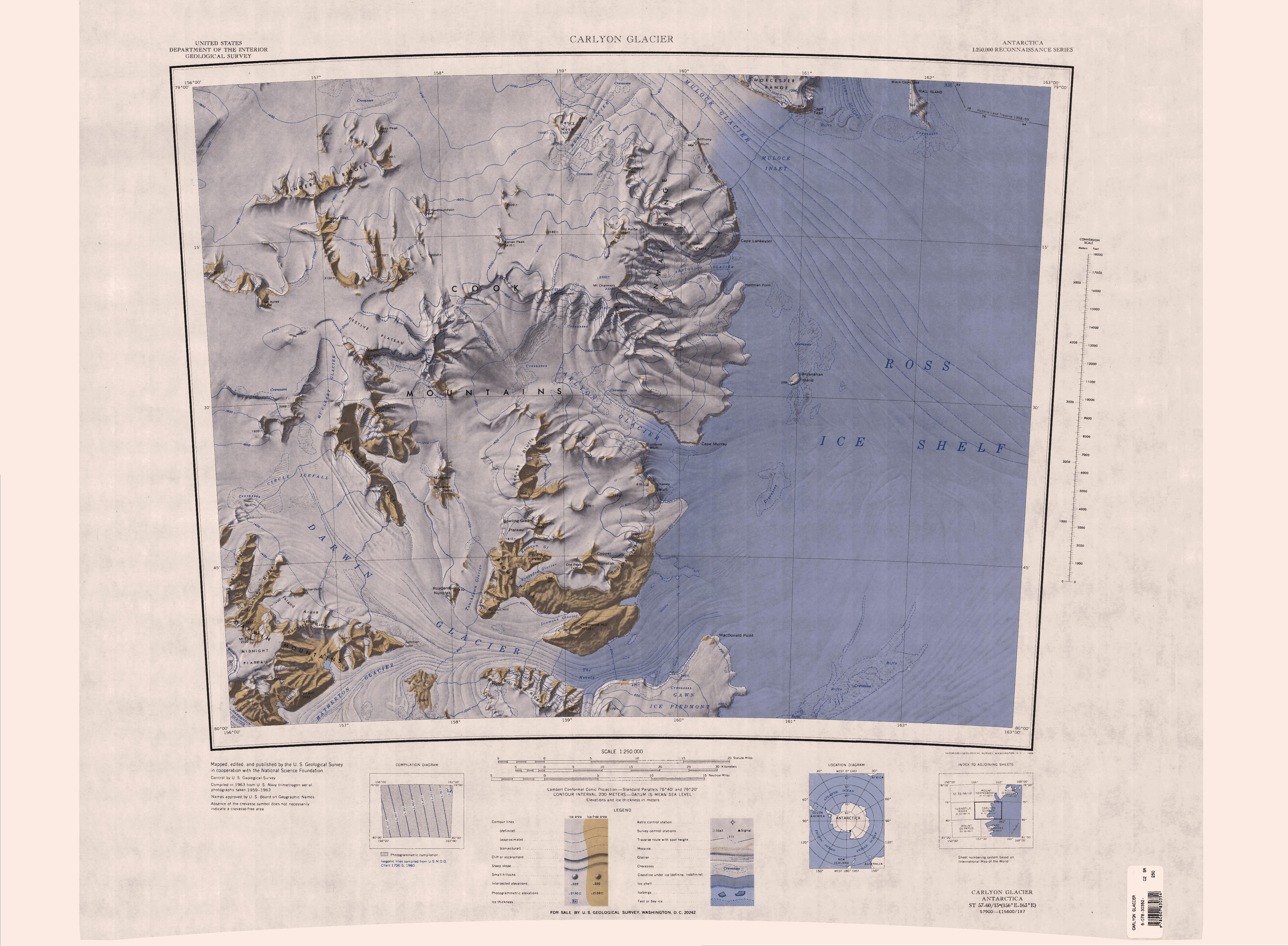
Southern tip of range in northeast

Features of the Worcester Range include, from north to south, Mount Harmsworth, Delta Bluff, Northcliffe Peak, Ant Hill, Bareface Bluff, Mount Speyer, Mount Dawson-Lambton and The Podium.

=== Mount Harmsworth ===
78°41′S 160°56′E. A prominent ice-covered peak, 2,765 metres (9,072 ft) high, at the northwest side of the head of Delta Glacier in the Worcester Range. Discovered by the British National Antarctic Expedition (BrNAE) (1901–04) and named for Sir Alfred Harmsworth, later Viscount Northcliffe, a generous contributor to the expedition.

=== Delta Bluff ===
78°41′S 161°22′E. A steep triangular rock bluff immediately north of the mouth of Delta Glacier, on the west side of Skelton Glacier. Surveyed and climbed in 1957 by the New Zealand party of the Commonwealth Trans-Antarctic Expedition (CTAE) (1956–58) and so named because of the shape of the bluff.

=== Northcliffe Peak ===
78°44′S 161°08′E. A prominent peak, 2,255 metres (7,398 ft) high, rising 4 nautical miles (7.4 km; 4.6 mi) southeast of Mount Harmsworth. Surveyed and named in 1957 by the N.Z. party of the CTAE (1956–58) because of its association with Mount Harmsworth. Sir Alfred Harmsworth, a generous contributor to the BrnAE (1901–04), was later created Viscount Northcliff.

=== Mount Marks ===
78°47′S 160°35′E A broad ice-covered mountain rising to 2,600 metres (8,500 ft) high, 5 nautical miles (9.3 km; 5.8 mi) north-northwest of Mount Speyer in Worcester Range. Named after Rodney Marks (1968–2000), an Australian citizen who died while conducting astrophysical research as a member of the 2000 winter party at the NSF South Pole Station. He was employed by the Smithsonian Astrophysical Observatory, working on the Antarctic Submillimeter Telescope and Remote Observatory, a research project of the University of Chicago's Center for Astrophysical Research in Antarctica (CARA). He previously had spent the 1998 winter at the Pole as part of CARA's South Pole Infrared Explorer project.

=== Ant Hill ===
78°47′S 161°27′E. A hill, 1,310 metres (4,300 ft) high, rising steeply on the west side of the Skelton Glacier between Ant Hill Glacier and Dilemma Glacier. Surveyed and named in 1957 by the New Zealand party of the CTAE, 1956–58. So named by geological members because of the prominent anticline in the bluff below the hill.

=== Bareface Bluff ===
78°50′S 161°40′E. A large, sheer snow-free bluff, 940 metres (3,080 ft) high, rising above Skelton Glacier, between Ant Hill Glacier and Mason Glacier. Surveyed and given this descriptive name in 1957 by the New Zealand party of the CTAE, 1956–58.

=== Mount Speyer ===
78°52′S 160°42′E. A mountain, 2,430 metres (7,970 ft) high, standing directly at the head of Kehle Glacier in the Worcester Range. Discovered by the BrnAE (1901–04) and named for Sir Edgar Speyer, a contributor to the expedition.

=== Mount Dawson-Lambton ===
78°54′S 160°37′E. A mountain, 2,295 metres (7,530 ft) high, standing 3 nautical miles (5.6 km; 3.5 mi) southwest of the summit of Mount Speyer in the Worcester Range. Discovered by the BrnAE (1901–04) and named after the Misses Dawson-Lambton, contributors to the expedition.

=== Jensen Rampart ===
78°52′S 160°8′E Steep rock cliffs that rise to 1,600 metres (5,200 ft) at the southwest edge of Worcester Range. The cliffs are 6 nautical miles (11 km; 6.9 mi) west of Mount Speyer and overlook the north side of Mulock Glacier. Named after Kate Jensen, NOAA field team leader at South Pole Station; also worked for ASA and Raytheon at South Pole.

=== The Podium ===
78°56′S 161°09′E. A high, flat ice-covered bluff, 1 nautical mile (1.9 km; 1.2 mi) in extent, which projects at the south end of the Worcester Range and surmounts the ice-filled embayment between Cape Teall and Cape Timberlake. So named by United States Advisory Committee on Antarctic Names (US-ACAN) in 1964 because of its position relative to nearby features and its resemblance to a podium.

== Nearby features ==
Isolated features to the north and west of the range include (from north east to south west) Clem Nunatak, Escalade Peak, Tate Peak, Swartz Nunataks and Mount Marvel.

=== Clem Nunatak ===
78°31′S 160°40′E. Isolated rock nunatak, 1,260 metres (4,130 ft) high, standing at the west side of Skelton Glacier, 7 nautical miles (13 km; 8.1 mi) southwest of Halfway Nunatak. Named by US-ACAN in 1964 for Willis R. Clem, a construction mechanic at McMurdo Station in 1959.

=== Escalade Peak ===
78°38′S 159°22′E. Prominent peak, 2,035 metres (6,677 ft) high, about 8 nautical miles (15 km; 9.2 mi) east of the south end of Boomerang Range. So named by the N.Z. party of the CTAE (1957–58) because its vertical pitches and platforms provide a ladder-like route to the summit.

=== Tate Peak ===
78°38′S 159°31′E. Sharp peak, 1,885 metres (6,184 ft) high, standing 2 nautical miles (3.7 km; 2.3 mi) east of Escalade Peak at the south side of Skelton Névé. Named by US-ACAN in 1964 for Lieutenant T.N. Tate, United States Navy, public works officer at McMurdo Station, 1963.

=== Swartz Nunataks ===
78°39′S 160°00′E. Two prominent nunataks, 1,565 metres (5,135 ft) high, protruding through the ice midway between the north part of the Worcester Range and Tate Peak. Named by US-ACAN in 1964 for Lt. Philip K. Swartz Jr., MC, United States Navy, officer in charge of the South Pole Station in 1961.

=== Mount Marvel ===
78°45′S 159°22′E. A mountain, 1,540 metres (5,050 ft) high, standing 7 nautical miles (13 km; 8.1 mi) south of Escalade Peak, near the head of Mulock Glacier. Named by US-ACAN in 1964 for Commander R. Marvel, United States Navy, officer in charge of Detachment Alpha at McMurdo Station in 1963.

== Sources ==
- Alberts, Fred G., ed. (1995), Geographic Names of the Antarctic (PDF) (2 ed.), United States Board on Geographic Names This article incorporates public domain material from websites or documents of the United States Board on Geographic Names.
- Carlyon Glacier, USGS: United States Geological Survey
- "Jensen Rampart", Geographic Names Information System, United States Geological Survey, United States Department of the Interior
- Mount Harmsworth, USGS: United States Geological Survey
- "Mount Marks", Geographic Names Information System, United States Geological Survey, United States Department of the Interior

This article incorporates public domain material from websites or documents of the United States Geological Survey.
