= Rodney Marks =

Australian astrophysicist (1968–2000)

- Born: Rodney David Marks; 13 March 1968; Geelong, Victoria, Australia
- Died: 12 May 2000 (aged 32); Amundsen–Scott South Pole Station, Antarctica
- Cause of death: Methanol poisoning
- Education: University of Melbourne; University of New South Wales
- Known for: Unsolved death
- Scientific career
- Fields: Astrophysics
- Workplaces: Smithsonian Astrophysical Observatory

Rodney David Marks (13 March 1968 – 12 May 2000) was an Australian astrophysicist who died from methanol poisoning while working in Antarctica.

== Early life ==
Marks was born in Geelong, Victoria, in Australia and received his education from the University of Melbourne, later obtaining a PhD from the University of New South Wales. Marks had Tourette syndrome.

== Career ==
Marks had wintered over at the South Pole station in 1997–1998, before being employed at the South Pole with the Smithsonian Astrophysical Observatory, working on the Antarctic Submillimeter Telescope and Remote Observatory, a research project for the University of Chicago at the Amundsen–Scott South Pole Station. He was engaged to Sonja Wolter, who was overwintering as a maintenance specialist at the base in order to be with him. Amundsen–Scott Pole Station is run by the National Science Foundation, a United States government agency, although much work at the time was subcontracted to Raytheon's Polar Services Company.

== Death ==
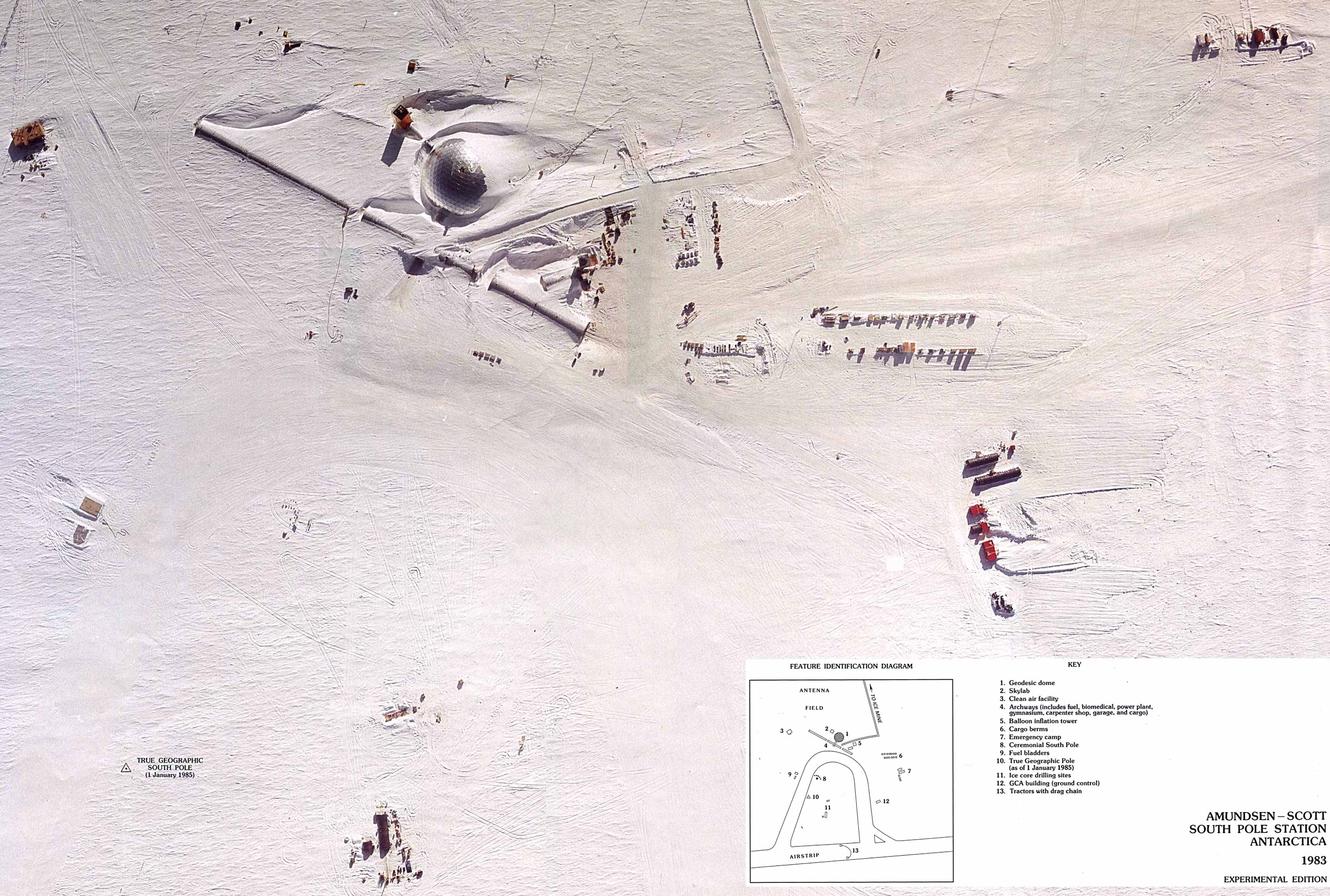
An aerial view of the South Pole and former base, showing the buildings Marks was walking between when he collapsed.

On 11 May 2000, Rodney Marks became unwell while walking between the remote observatory and the base. He became increasingly sick over a 36-hour period, three times returning increasingly distressed to the station's doctor. Advice was sought by satellite, but Marks died on 12 May 2000, aged 32, with his condition undiagnosed.

The National Science Foundation issued a statement saying that Rodney Marks had "apparently died of natural causes, but the specific cause of death ha[d] yet to be determined". The exact cause of Marks' death could not be determined until his body was removed from Amundsen–Scott Station and flown off the continent for autopsy. The case received media attention as the "first South Pole murder", as suicide was considered the least likely cause of his death. He was buried in Bellbrae Cemetery, Mount Duneed, Victoria, Australia.

== Investigations into death ==
Marks' body was held for nearly six months over winter before it could be flown to Christchurch, New Zealand, the base for American activities in Antarctica, for autopsy. Once in New Zealand, a post mortem established that Marks had died from methanol poisoning. Both the United States and Australia agreed to a coroner's inquest being held in New Zealand.

Jurisdiction issues in the Antarctic are complicated; most American operations within Antarctica—including the South Pole base—are within the Ross Dependency territory claimed by New Zealand, from where supplies are dispatched. The U.S. Government does not accept New Zealand's claim to territorial sovereignty or the application of New Zealand law to U.S. citizens operating in the Antarctic from Operation Deep Freeze's Christchurch base. New Zealand has not questioned the use of U.S. Marshals in relation to crimes involving only Americans in the Ross Dependency.

An investigation was undertaken by Detective Senior Sergeant (DSS) Grant Wormald, of the New Zealand Police, at the direction of Richard McElrea, the Christchurch coroner. A formal verdict has yet to be entered; a 2006 series of Coroners Court hearings and statements to the media raised questions from both the police and the Coroner's Court if Marks' poisoning was intentional. DSS Wormald said, "In my view it is most likely Marks ingested the methanol unknowingly."

DSS Wormald stated it was not credible to believe he had deliberately drunk the methanol, when he had ready access to a large supply of alcohol. Marks had recently entered a new relationship, had nearly completed important academic work and had no financial problems. He had promptly sought treatment for an illness that confused him, and there was no reason to suspect suicidal intent.

DSS Wormald indicated that Raytheon and the National Science Foundation had not been cooperative. DSS Wormald stated regarding the NSF conclusion that Marks' death was from natural causes: "We wanted the results of [the NSF] internal investigation and to get in contact with people who were there to ask them some questions," said Wormald. "They weren't prepared to tell us who was there "... "they have advised that no report exists. To be frank, I think there is more there; there must be", Wormald said. "I am not entirely satisfied that all relevant information and reports have been disclosed to the New Zealand police or the coroner".

Having obtained details of the 49 other people at the base at the time, DSS Wormald told a newspaper, "I suspect that there have been people who have thought twice about making contact with us on the basis of their future employment position". The U.S. Department of Justice also failed to obtain answers from the two organizations, which appeared to have denied jurisdiction.

In December 2006 the Christchurch Coroner reconvened the investigation, the results of which were widely reported; the coroner's hearing in Christchurch was then adjourned indefinitely. Marks' father thanked the New Zealand police, who he said faced an "arduous task of dealing with people that quite obviously don't want to deal with them".

In January 2007, seven years after the death, the case was again front-page news in New Zealand, when documents obtained under America's Freedom of Information Act suggested "diplomatic heat was brought to bear on the NZ inquiry".

In September 2008, the written report resulting from the December 2006 inquest was released. The coroner could not find evidence to support theories of a prank gone awry nor foul play nor suicide.

The cause of the fatal methanol poisoning has never been determined, and the Marks family has given up hope of learning what happened. Paul Marks, Rodney's father, is quoted as saying "...And I don't think we are going to try to find out any more in regards to how Rodney died. I'd see that as a fruitless exercise."

== Memorial ==
Mount Marks, a mountain in the Worcester Range with a height of 2,600 metres (8,530 ft) (78°47′S, 160°35′E), is named after Marks. A plaque was erected at the base, and the site of the South Pole in January 2001 is marked by a memorial to him.

== See also ==
- List of unsolved deaths
