= Yamagata Ridge =

Yamagata Ridge (79°5′S 157°2′E) is a narrow linear nunatak, 3 miles (4.8 km) long and rising to 1690 m, located 5 miles (8 km) west of Seay Peak in the N-central part of Finger Ridges, Cook Mountains. Named after Noboru Yamagata, Institute of Public Health, Japan, geochemist with the Japanese Antarctic Research Expedition (JARE) for four field seasons in the McMurdo Dry Valleys, 1963–64 to 1968–69.

== See also ==
- Harper Ridge
