= Alfred Austin =

English poet (1835–1913)

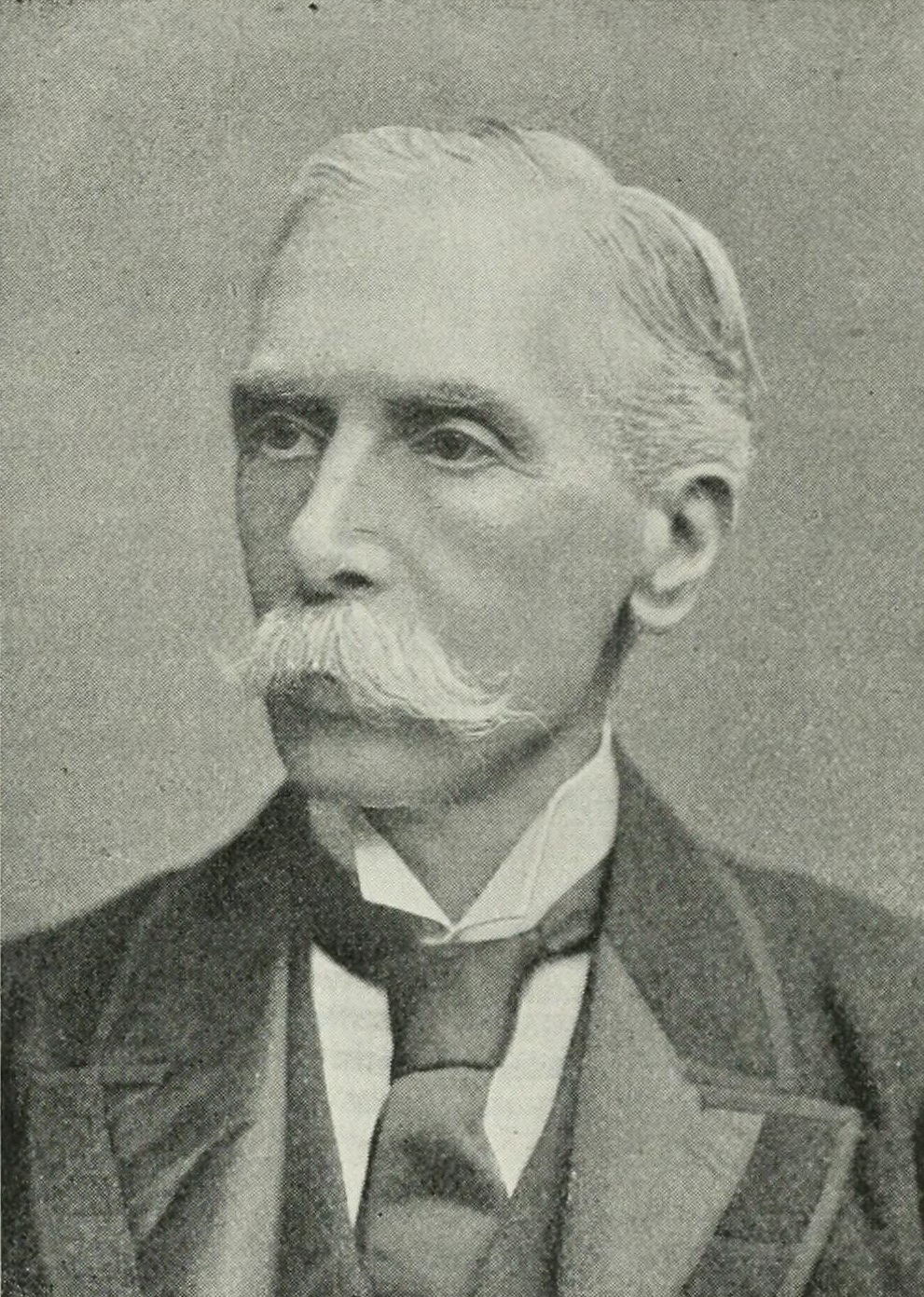
- Alfred Austin, by Langfier, 1900.

Poet Laureate of the United Kingdom
- In office 1 January 1896 – 2 June 1913
- Monarchs: Victoria; Edward VII; George V
- Preceded by: Alfred, Lord Tennyson
- Succeeded by: Robert Bridges

Personal details
- Born: 30 May 1835 Headingley, Yorkshire, England
- Died: 2 June 1913 (aged 78) Ashford, Kent, England
- Spouse: Hester Jane Homan-Mulock
- Occupation: Poet, novelist, dramatist

Alfred Austin DL (30 May 1835 – 2 June 1913) was an English poet who was appointed Poet Laureate in 1896, after an interval following the death of Tennyson, when the other candidates had either caused controversy or refused the honour. It was claimed that he was being rewarded for his support for the Conservative leader Lord Salisbury in the General Election of 1895. Austin's poems are little remembered today, his most popular work being prose idylls celebrating nature. Wilfred Scawen Blunt wrote of him, "He is an acute and ready reasoner, and is well read in theology and science. It is strange his poetry should be such poor stuff, and stranger still that he should imagine it immortal."

== Life ==
Alfred Austin was born in Headingley, near Leeds, on 30 May 1835, to a Roman Catholic family. His father, Joseph Austin, was a merchant in Leeds; his mother was a sister of Joseph Locke, the civil engineer and M.P. for Honiton. Austin was educated at Stonyhurst College (Clitheroe, Lancashire), St Mary's College, Oscott, and University of London, from which he graduated in 1853. He became a barrister in 1857 but after inheriting a fortune from his uncle gave up his legal career for literature.

He unsuccessfully stood as a Conservative Party candidate for Taunton in 1865, finishing in fourth place, and at Dewsbury in 1880.

Politically conservative, between 1866 and 1896 Austin edited National Review and wrote leading articles for The Standard. He was Foreign Affairs Correspondent with the Standard and served as a special correspondent to the Ecumenical Council of the Vatican in 1870; at the Headquarters of the King of Prussia during the Franco-Prussian War, 1870; at the Congress of Berlin, 1878 where he was granted an audience by German Chancellor Otto von Bismarck. An ardent imperialist and follower of Disraeli he became, in 1883, joint editor of the National Review with W. J. Courthope and was sole editor from 1887 until 1896.

On Tennyson's death in 1892 it was felt that none of the then living poets, except Algernon Charles Swinburne or William Morris, who were outside consideration on other grounds, was of sufficient distinction to succeed to the laurel crown, and for several years no new poet-laureate was nominated. In the interval the claims of one writer and another were assessed, but eventually, in 1896, Austin was appointed to the post after Morris had declined it. As a poet Austin never ranked highly in the opinions of his peers and was often derided as being a "Banjo Byron".

The critic Edmund Broadus wrote that the choice of Austin for poet-laureate had much to do with Austin's friendship with Lord Salisbury, his position as an editor and leader writer, and his willingness to use his poetry to support the government. For example, shortly before his appointment was announced, Austin published a sonnet entitled "A Vindication of England", written in response to a series of sonnets by William Watson, published in the Westminster Gazette, that had accused Salisbury's government of betraying Armenia and abandoning its people to Turkish massacres.

Sir Owen Seaman (1861–1936) gave added currency to the supposed connection with Lord Salisbury in his poem, "To Mr Alfred Austin", In Cap and Bells, London & New York, 1900, 9:

At length a callous Tory chief arose,
Master of caustic jest and cynic gibe,
Looked round the Carlton Club and lightly chose
Its leading scribe.

Austin served as Deputy-Lieutenant for Herefordshire. Austin died of unknown causes at Swinford Old Manor, Hothfield, near Ashford, Kent, England, where he had been ill for some time.

== Family ==
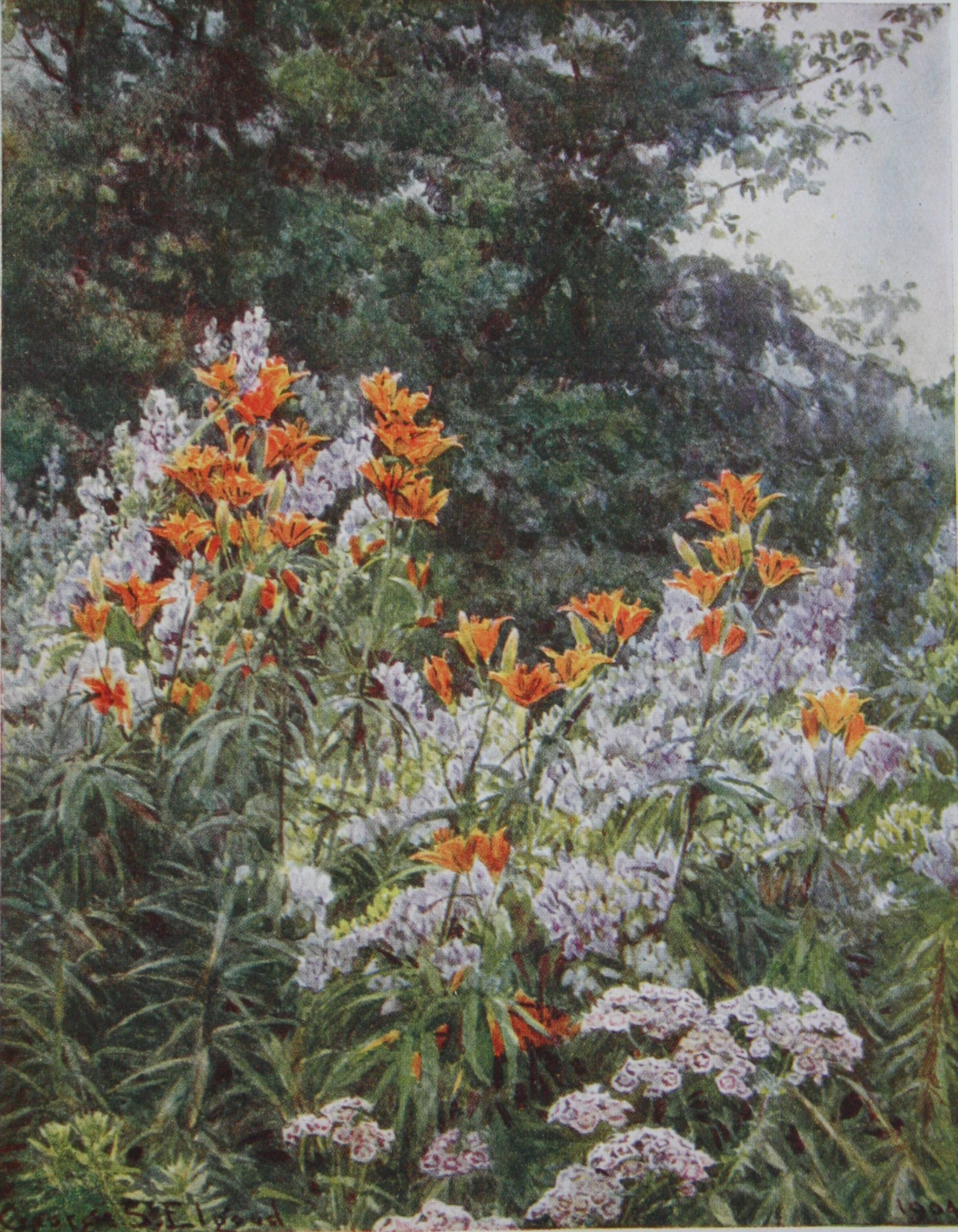
Plate from The Garden that I love

On 14 November 1865 Austin married Hester Jane Homan-Mulock, tenth child of Thomas Homan-Mulock and Frances Sophia Berry at St Marylebone Parish Church, London. In his Autobiography, Austin gives a curious account of how they met. Seeing the photograph of a young lady in an album belonging to his friend Isa Blagden in Florence, he had asked: "Who is that?" and received the reply, "The girl you ought to marry, if you can." Austin brought home a letter of introduction, the presentation of which led to his receiving at his cottage in Hertfordshire Hester (the young lady in the photograph), her sister and their chaperon, together with their friend Thomas Adolphus Trollope, brother of Anthony Trollope. At a second visit Hester became engaged to Alfred. Throughout his career as journalist and writer Austin derived constant help and support from his wife. She died suddenly on 23 September 1929 at her residence in Kensington. His nephews included the Polar Explorer Captain George Mulock and British diplomat Sir Howard William Kennard (1878–1955), British Ambassador to Poland at the outbreak of the Second World War.

== Poetry ==
In 1861, after two false starts in poetry and fiction, he made his first noteworthy appearance as a writer with The Season: a Satire, which contained incisive lines, and was marked by some promise both in wit and observation. In 1870 he published a volume of criticism, The Poetry of the Period, which was conceived in the spirit of satire, and attacked Tennyson, Browning, Matthew Arnold and Swinburne in an unrestrained fashion. The book aroused some discussion at the time, but its lack of balance meant that its judgments were extremely uncritical. Austin wrote of the "detestable gibberish" of Robert Browning, of Swinburne's "emasculated poetic voice," and of William Morris as "the idle singer of an empty day," and he prophesied that Tennyson's In Memoriam "will assuredly be handed over to the dust when a generation arises that has come to its senses." Austin himself, while he continued to "think that there was a strong element of truth in The Poetry of the Period," soon came to deem "the tone in which it was written unfortunate," and in 1873, three years after its publication, he withdrew it from circulation.

A contemporary critic, Walter Whyte, praised the "purity" of Austin's style: "He writes sound unaffected English; his meaning is always transparent. He has not sought to emulate Tennyson's exquisite elaboration of diction; his lines are seldom jewelled by 'curious felicities.' But they are always graceful, and sometimes admirably vigorous and hearty.[...] One of the charms of his poetry lies in the freshness and vividness of his descriptions of Nature. He has dealt powerfully with the grandeurs of Alpine scenery, but his happiest pictures are of English fields and woods."

The critic George Saintsbury, while endorsing the general view that "Alfred Austin hardly deserved to be made poet laureate," found him "a really vigorous and accomplished writer of prose, and a tolerable master of unambitious form in verse." Austin, he wrote, "could keep up poems of some length like Prince Lucifer and The Human Tragedy," and approach a modicum of "vigour and passion in lyric."

As poet-laureate, his topical verses did not escape negative criticism; a hasty poem written in praise of the Jameson Raid in 1896 being a notable instance. A drama by him, Flodden Field, was performed at His Majesty's theatre in 1903, with incidental music by Percy Pitt. A number of his poems were set to music by Frances Allitsen, and Alexander Mackenzie's contribution to Choral Songs in Honour of Her Majesty Queen Victoria (1899) was a setting of Austin's occasional poem "With wisdom, goodness, grace".

== Bibliography ==
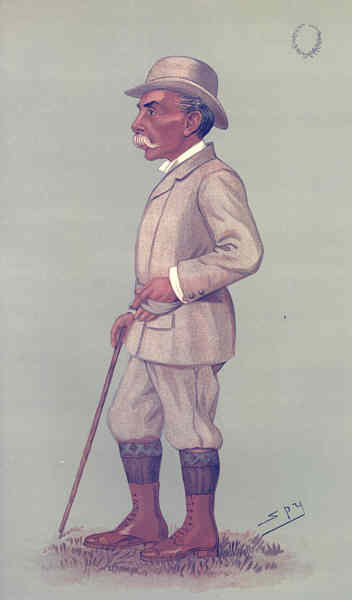
Austin caricatured by Spy for Vanity Fair, 1896

Novels

- (1858). Five Years of It. London: J. F. Hope (2 vols) Volume 1 · Volume 2
- (1864). An Artist's Proof, London: Tinsley (3 vols) Volume 1 · Volume 2 · Volume 3
- (1866). Won by a Head. London: Chapman & Hall (3 vols) Volume 1 · Volume 2 · Volume 3

Poetry

- (1855). Randolph: A Poem in Two Cantos. London: Saunders & Otley. Revised edition published as Leszko the Bastard: A Tale of Polish Grief (1877), London: Chapman & Hall
- (1856). Grandmother's Teaching Littell's Living Age cited
- (1861). The Season: A Satire, London: Hardwicke. Revised edition (1861), London: George Manwaring; new revised edition (1869), London: Hotten
- (1861). My Satire and its Censors. London: George Manwaring
- (1862). The Human Tragedy: A Poem, London: Hardwicke. Revised edition (1876), Edinburgh: Blackwood; new revised edition (1889), London: Macmillan
- (1871). The Golden Age: A Satire. London: Chapman & Hall.
- (1872). Interludes. Edinburgh and London: Blackwood
- (1873). Rome or Death!. Edinburgh and London: Blackwood
- (1882). Soliloquies in Song. London: Macmillan
- (1885). At the Gate of the Convent and Other Poems. London: Macmillan
- (1889). Love's Widowhood and Other Poems. London: Macmillan
- (1891). Lyrical Poems. London & New York: Macmillan
- (1891). Narrative Poems. London & New York: Macmillan. 2nd edition (1896)
- (1895). Madonna's Child . London: Macmillan
- (1897). The Conversion of Winckelmann and Other Poems. London: Macmillan
- (1900). Songs of England. London: Macmillan
- (1902). A Tale of True Love and Other Poems. London: Macmillan, New York: Harper
- (1906). The Door of Humility. London: Macmillan
- (1908). Sacred and Profane Love and Other Poems. London: Macmillan

Drama

- (1874). The Tower of Babel: A Poetical Drama. Edinburgh: Blackwood
- (1881). Savonarola: A Tragedy. London: Macmillan
- (1887). Prince Lucifer. London: Macmillan; 3rd edition (1891).
- (1892). Fortunatus the Pessimist: A Dramatic Poem London & New York: Macmillan
- (1896). England's Darling London & New York: Macmillan. Republished as Alfred the Great: England's Darling (1901). London: Macmillan .
- (1903). Flodden Field: A Tragedy. London: Macmillan
- (1904). A Lesson in Harmony. London and New York: Samuel French

Other

- (1869). A Vindication of Lord Byron. London: Chapman & Hall
- (1870). The Poetry of the Period. London: Richard Bentley
- (1885). Skeletons at the Feast. Or, The Radical Programme. London: W. H. Allen
- (1894). The Garden that I Love. London & New York: Macmillan
- (1895). In Veronica's Garden. London & New York: Macmillan
- (1898). Lamia's Winter-Quarters. London: Macmillan
- (1902). Haunts of Ancient Peace. London & New York: Macmillan; London: A. & C. Black
- (1904). The Poet's Diary. London: Macmillan
- (1904). An Eighteenth Century Anthology. London: Blackie
- (1907). The Garden That I Love: Second Series. London: Macmillan
- (1910). The Bridling of Pegasus: Prose Papers on Poetry. London: Macmillan
- (1911). The Autobiography of Alfred Austin, Poet Laureate, 1835–1910. London: Macmillan (2 vols) - Volume 1 · Volume 2

== In popular culture ==
Austin was the subject of a Vanity Fair cartoon by Spy published on 20 February 1896.

He was caricatured as "Sir Austed Alfrin" by L. Frank Baum in his 1906 novel John Dough and the Cherub.

Van Morrison's song "Haunts of Ancient Peace", the first track on his 1980 album Common One, took its title from Austin's 1902 book of the same name.

== A Poem – To England ==
To England

(Written in Mid-Channel.)

Now upon English soil I soon shall stand,
Homeward from climes that fancy deems more fair;
And well I know that there will greet me there
No soft foam fawning upon smiling strand,
No scent of orange-groves, no zephyrs bland;
But Amazonian March, with breast half bare
And sleety arrows whistling through the air,
Will be my welcome from that burly land.
Yet he who boasts his birth-place yonder lies
Owns in his heart a mood akin to scorn
For sensuous slopes that bask 'neath Southern skies,
Teeming with wine and prodigal of corn,
And, gazing through the mist with misty eyes,
Blesses the brave bleak land where he was born.

== Notes ==
Court offices
Preceded by Alfred, Lord Tennyson	British Poet Laureate; 1892–1913	Succeeded by Robert Bridges
