= Fault Bluff =

ins
- Location within Antarctica

Highest point
- Coordinates: 79°18′S 157°40′E

Geography
- Continent: Antarctica
- Parent range: Cook Mountains

Fault Bluff is a 2,320 metres (7,600 ft) high rock bluff located about 9 nautical miles (17 km) northeast of Mount Longhurst in the Cook Mountains of Antarctica. The rock bluff was visited in the 1957–58 season by the Darwin Glacier Party of the Commonwealth Trans-Antarctic Expedition, 1956–58. They originated the name which presumably refers to a geological fault at the bluff.

== Geology ==
Fault Bluff is a paleontologically important outcrop of the Aztec Siltstone that has yielded abundant fossils of Devonian vertebrates, including Bothriolepis and Groenlandaspis (armored placoderm fishes) and scales of an extinct lobe-finned fish. The fossils occur either as thin layers of well preserved, concentrated, bone beds or well-sorted, silt-size, bone mush. The bone beds have yielded complete fish spines and bony plates. Fault Bluff' is the type locality for the phyllolepid placoderms, Austrophyllolepis quiltyi and Placolepis tingeyi. This outcrop of the Aztec Siltstone continues along a low ridge associated with Fault Bluff that has the equally important and fossiliferous Fish Hotel vertebrate fossil site at its end. In addition to fossil fishes, fossil lycopod and psilophyte plant remains, including Haplostigma lineare, have been found at both Fault Bluff and Fish Hotel fossil site.

== See also ==
- Mount Gudmundson, standing 6 nautical miles (11 km) northeast of Fault Bluff
