= David H. Bromwich =

American earth scientist

David H. Bromwich is a member of the Byrd Polar Research Center and a professor at the Department of Geography, Ohio State University. His work has involved the evaluation and diagnosis of polar weather and climate variability.

He received his PhD in meteorology from the University of Wisconsin, Madison. In 1979 he joined Ohio State's Byrd Polar Research Center as a research scientist.

His research has focused on the variability of precipitation over Antarctica, Greenland, and the Arctic Ocean, thus contributing to the understanding of climate and potential sea level changes. He has made contributions to defining aspects of U.S. science policy.

Having helped identify the need to improve numerical weather prediction (NWP) for the Antarctic, Bromwich has been influential in the development and evaluation of the Antarctic Mesoscale Prediction System (AMPS).

In April 2001 AMPS was one of four weather models used to predict a window of opportunity for the emergency medical evacuation of Ronald Shemenski from the Amundsen–Scott South Pole Station. Flights to the base are normally halted from late February until November because of the extreme winter cold and darkness. But the airlift was successfully completed and pilot Sean Loutitt confirmed the reliance on the forecasts, stating "The weather was the biggest concern".

Bromwich Terrace, in the Cook Mountains is named after him.
