= Conway Range =

Mountain range in Antarctica

ins
- Location within Antarctica

Geography
- Continent: Antarctica
- Range coordinates: 79°16′S 159°30′E
- Parent range: Cook Mountains

Conway Range (79°16′S 159°30′E) is a mountain range in the Cook Mountains of Antarctica, on the west edge of the Ross Ice Shelf. It is south of the Worcester Range.

== Location ==
The Conway Range is in the northeast part of the Cook Mountains. It lies between Mulock Glacier to the north and Carlyon Glacier to the south, both of which empty into the Ross Ice Shelf. The Worcester Range forms the other side of the Mulock Glacier. The Heap Glacier enters the Mulock Glacier to the west of the north end of the range.

The range was discovered by the British National Antarctic Expedition, 1901–1904, but the name appears to be first used in the reports of the British Antarctic Expedition, 1907–1909.

== Glaciers ==
=== Bertoglio Glacier ===
79°18′S 160°20′E. Glacier 7 miles (11 km) long, flowing from the Conway Range eastward between Cape Lankester and Hoffman Point to the Ross Ice Shelf. Mapped by the USGS from tellurometer surveys and Navy air photos, 1959-63. Named by US-ACAN for Cdr. Lloyd W. Bertoglio, USN, commander of the McMurdo Station winter party, 1960.

== Coastal features ==
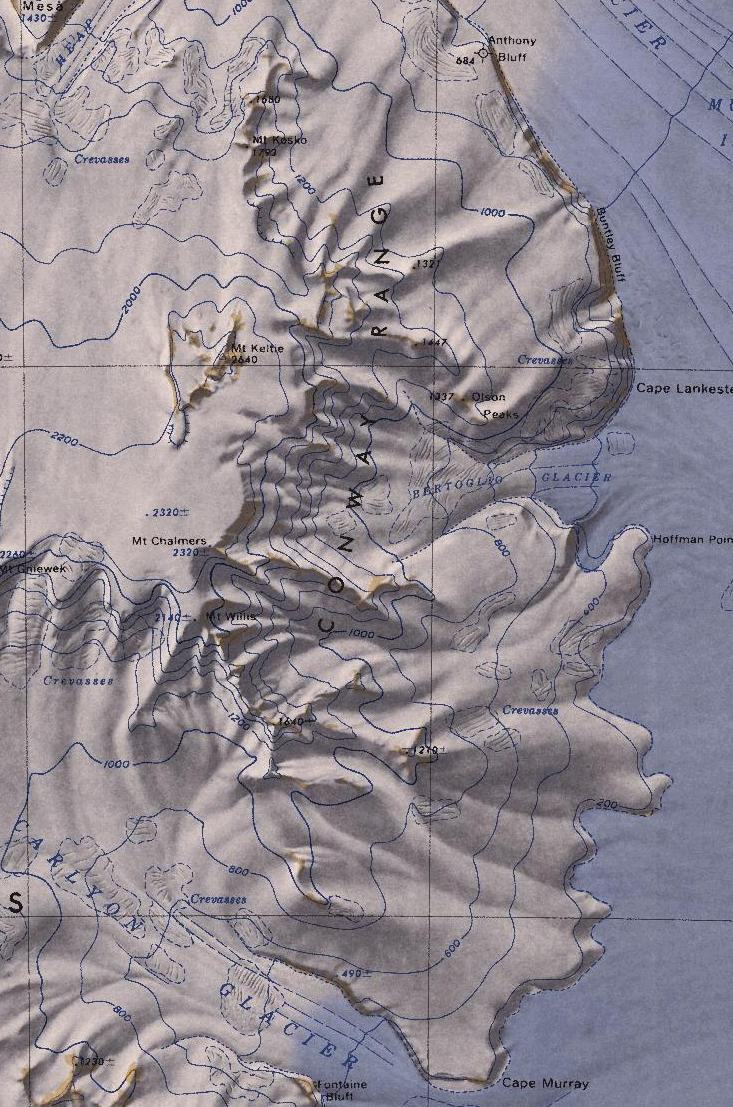
Conway Range

Coastal features, from north to south, include:

=== Anthony Bluff ===
79°06′S 160°07′E. A conspicuous rock bluff along the south wall of Mulock Glacier, about 9 miles (14 km) northwest of Cape Lankester. Mapped by the USGS from tellurometer surveys and Navy air photos, 1959-63. Named by US-ACAN for Capt. Alexander Anthony, USAF, in charge of science and publications on the staff of the U.S. Antarctic Projects Officer, 1963-65.

=== Cape Lankester ===
79°16′S 160°29′E. A high, rounded, snow-covered cape at the south side of the entrance to Mulock Inlet, along the west edge of the Ross Ice Shelf. Discovered and named by the BrNAE (1901-04). Probably named for Sir Edwin Ray Lankester, Director of the Natural History Department of the British Museum (1898-1907) and founder of the Marine Biological Association in 1884.

=== Hoffman Point ===
79°20′S 160°30′E. An ice-covered coastal point at the south side of the mouth of Bertoglio Glacier, where the latter flows into Ross Ice Shelf. Mapped by the USGS from tellurometer surveys and Navy air photos, 1959-63. Named by US-ACAN for Cdr. G.L. Hoffman, CEC, USN, commander of Mobile Construction Battalion Eight at McMurdo Station in USN OpDFrz 1964.

=== Cape Murray ===
79°35′S 160°11′E A mainly ice-covered coastal bluff at the north side of the mouth of Carlyon Glacier, on the west side of the Ross Ice Shelf. Discovered by the BrNAE (1901-04) and named for George R.M. Murray, temporary director of the scientific staff of the expedition, who had accompanied the Discovery as far as Cape Town.

== Mountains ==
Mountains, from north to south, include:

=== Mount Kosko ===
79°09′S 159°33′E. A peak, 1,795 metres (5,889 ft) high, standing 6 miles (9.7 km) north of Mount Keltic in the Conway Range. Mapped by the USGS from tellurometer surveys and Navy air photos, 1959-63. Named by US-ACAN for Arno Kosko, ionosphere scientist at Byrd Station, 1963.

=== Mount Keltie ===
79°15′S 159°29′E. Mountain, 2,640 metres (8,660 ft) high, midway between Mounts Kosko and Chalmers in the Conway Range. Discovered by the BrNAE (1901-04) and named for Sir John Scott Keltie, Secretary of the Royal Geographical Society, 1892-1915.

=== Olson Peaks ===
79°16′S 160°05′E. Two close-lying peaks, the higher 1,335 metres (4,380 ft), standing 4 miles (6.4 km) west of Cape Lankester on the north side of Bertoglio Glacier. Mapped by the USGS from tellurometer surveys and Navy air photos, 1959-63. Named by US-ACAN for Gary D. Olson, a member of the U.S. Army aviation support unit for Topo North and Topo South (1961-62) which conducted the tellurometer surveys.

=== Mount Gniewek ===
79°20′S 158°55′E. A conspicuous ice-covered flat-topped mountain, 2,060 metres (6,760 ft) high, standing at the north side of Carlyon Glacier, 6 miles (9.7 km) southwest of Mount Keltie Mapped by the USGS from tellurometer surveys and Navy air photos, 1959-63. Named by US-AC AN for John J. Gniewek, geomagnetician at Little America V, 1958.

=== Mount Chalmers ===
79°20′S 159°29′E. A mountain along the east escarpment of the Conway Range, about 5 miles (8.0 km) south of the summit of Mount Keltie. Discovered by the BrNAE (1901-04) and named for Robert Chalmers (later Baron of Northiam), Assistant Secretary of the Treasury, 1903-07.

=== Mount Willis ===
79°22′S 159°27′E. A mountain 2 miles (3.2 km) south of Mount Chalmers in the southern part of the Conway Range. Mapped by the USGS from tellurometer surveys and Navy air photos, 1959-63. Named by US-ACAN for Lt. Cdr. Charles H. Willis, USN, commander of USS Wilhoite on ocean station duty in support of aircraft flights between Christchurch and McMurdo Sound during USN OpDFrz 1961.

== Sources ==
- Alberts, Fred G., ed. (1995), Geographic Names of the Antarctic (PDF) (2 ed.), United States Board on Geographic Names This article incorporates public domain material from websites or documents of the United States Board on Geographic Names.
- Carlyon Glacier, USGS United States Geologic Survey, 1960
