= Carlyon Glacier =

Glacier in Antarctica

Carlyon Glacier (79°34′S 159°50′E) is a large glacier which flows east-southeast from the névé east of Mill Mountain to the Ross Ice Shelf at Cape Murray. It was mapped in 1958 by the Darwin Glacier party of the Commonwealth Trans-Antarctic Expedition (1956–58), and named by the New Zealand Antarctic Place-Names Committee for R.A. Carlyon, who with Harry Ayres made up the party.

== See also ==
- Soyuz-17 Cliff
- Yoshida Bluff
