= Redford Mulock =

Royal Canadian Air Force Air Commodore (1886-1961)

Redford Henry Mulock
- Born: 11 August 1886; Winnipeg, Manitoba, Canada
- Died: 23 January 1961 (aged 74)
- Military career
- Allegiance: Canada; United Kingdom
- Branch: Canadian Army (1911–15); Royal Naval Air Service (1915–18); Royal Air Force (1918–19); Royal Canadian Air Force (1924–35)
- Service years: 1911–1919; 1924–1935
- Rank: Air Commodore
- Nickname: "Red"
- Commands: No. 3 Squadron RNAS
- Conflicts: First World War
- Awards: Commander of the Order of the British Empire; Distinguished Service Order & Bar; Mentioned in Despatches (3); Knight of the Legion of Honour (France)

Air Commodore Redford Henry Mulock, CBE, DSO & Bar (11 August 1886 – 23 January 1961) was a Canadian aviator and flying ace. He was the first Canadian flying ace of the First World War and the first in the Royal Naval Air Service, achieving five aerial victories by May 1916.

== Military career ==
Mulock studied electrical engineering at McGill University before joining 13 Battery, Canadian Field Artillery in 1911. He enrolled in the Canadian Expeditionary Force in September 1914 and served as a corporal with the 1st Battery, 1st Brigade, and 12th Battery, 3rd Brigade, Canadian Field Artillery in Canada and England until December 1915. After transferring to the Royal Naval Air Service and undergoing pilot training, he was posted to 1 Naval Wing. Although he first saw combat in July 1915, he did not score his first win until 30 December. He then scored on 24 and 26 January 1916, and twice on 21 May 1916. Four of the victories were of the "out of control" variety; the other was "forced to land".

Mulock received a Distinguished Service Order (DSO) on 22 June 1916. In 1917, he was promoted to command of No. 3 Squadron RNAS; in September, he was awarded the French Legion of Honour. A Bar to his DSO followed in April 1918, along with a promotion to wing commander. He was Mentioned in Despatches three times.

After the war, Mulock served with the Royal Canadian Air Force Reserve, rising to the rank of air commodore by 1935. He then left the military and joined Canadian Airways.

In 2010, Mulock was posthumously inducted into the Canada's Aviation Hall of Fame.
