= Yamagata (surname) =

Yamagata (written: 山形, 山像, 山片 or 山縣) is a Japanese surname. Notable people with the surname include:

- Yamagata Aritomo (1838–1922), Japanese military leader and politician
- Yamagata Bantō (1748–1821), Japanese scholar and merchant
- Hiro Yamagata (artist) (born 1948), Japanese artist based in Los Angeles, California
- Hiro Yamagata (born 1964), Japanese author, critic, economist, and translator
- Isao Yamagata (1915–1996), Japanese film actor
- Kakuko Yamagata (born 1969), Japanese singer
- Kaori Yamagata (born 1963), Japanese voice actress
- Kyohei Yamagata (born 1981), Japanese football player
- Yamagata Masakage (1524–1575), Japanese samurai
- Rachael Yamagata (born 1977), American singer-songwriter
- Ryota Yamagata (born 1992), Japanese sprinter
- Tatsunori Yamagata (born 1983), Japanese football player
- Yukio Yamagata (born 1957), Japanese singer, actor, and voice actor
- Yusuke Yamagata (born 1986), Japanese footballer
