= HMS Jed =

Two ships have borne the name HMS Jed.

- HMS Jed (1904) was a River-class destroyer launched in 1904 and laid up in 1919.
- HMS Jed (K235) was a River-class frigate launched in 1942, placed in reserve in 1946 and broken up in 1957.
