= Mulock Glacier =

Glacier in Antarctica

- Location within Antarctica
- Location: Ross Dependency
- Coordinates: 79°00′S 160°00′E
- Terminus: Ross Ice Shelf

The Mulock Glacier (79°00′S 160°00′E) is a large, heavily crevassed glacier which flows into the Ross Ice Shelf 40 kilometers (25 miles) south of the Skelton Glacier in the Ross Dependency, Antarctica.

== Name ==
The Mulock Glacier was named by the New Zealand Antarctic Place-Names Committee (e NZAPC) in association with Mulock Inlet for Lieutenant George Mulock, Royal Navy, surveyor with the expedition.

== Glaciology ==
The main trunk of the Mulock Glacier is about 60 kilometres (37 mi) long and drops about 800 metres (2,600 ft) from the edge of the East Antarctic Ice Sheet to its grounding line at its mouth. It has the largest catchment area between David Glacier and Byrd Glacier, and drains about 5.23±0.59 gigatonnes of ice per year into the Ross Ice Shelf. Its discharge rate is roughly in balance with the accumulation rate in its catchment area. Velocities vary along its course, probably due to changes in the ground slope below the glacier. In 1960–61 ice velocities along the grounded center line were about 387 metres (1,270 ft) per year. In 2001–02 these had risen to about 457 metres (1,499 ft) per year, and in 2006–07 to about 493 metres (1,617 ft) per year. This increase in velocities, if real, should be resulting in thinning along the glacier's length.

Mulock Glacier is the second-largest contributor of ice from East Antarctica to the Ross Ice Shelf. The largest is Byrd Glacier, not far to the south past Darwin Glacier. Mulock Glacier enters the Ross Ice Shelf from the west, so its flow opposes West Antarctic ice streams flowing from the east into the Ross Ice Shelf. Its flow interacts with the much smaller Darwin Glacier and the larger Byrd Glacier, which also resists West Antarctic ice streams. Hughes et al. (2017) consider that the East Antarctic outlet glaciers act as "nails" holding the Ross Ice Shelf in place. If climate warming melts the sea ice along the Ross Ice Shelf calving front, the front will retreat and the glaciers will punch through it, starting with Mulock Glacier and Byrd Glacier. As the ice shelf weakens, ice streams from the West Antarctic will surge and eventually the marine part of the West Antarctic ice sheet Shelf will disintegrate.

== Course ==
The Mulock Glacier forms on the Antarctic ice sheet to the south of the Warren Range and Boomerang Range. Deception Glacier flow south from between these ranges into upper Mulock Glacier. It flows southeast past Mount Marvel to the north and the Henry Mesa to the south. Heap Glacier flows northeastward to Mulock Glacier to the east of Henry Mesa. The Kehle Glacier joins it from Mount Speyer to the northeast in the Worcester Range. It flows past Anthony Bluff, Buntley Bluff and Cape Lankester to the southwest, and Cape Teall to the northeast to enter the Mulock Inlet and the Ross Ice Shelf. The Evteev Glacier enters the Ross Ice Shelf just north of Cape Teall.

== Tributaries ==
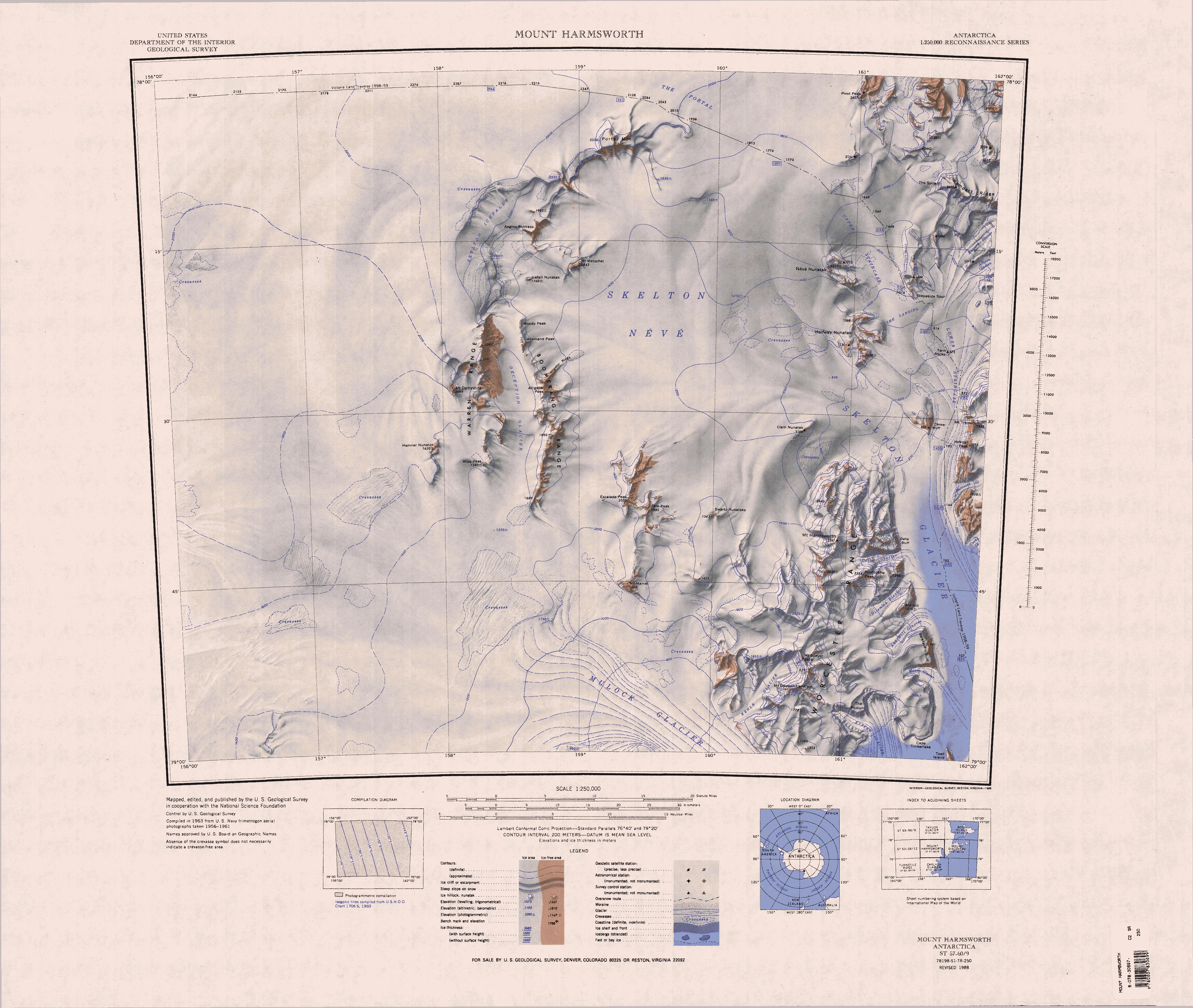
Upper Mulock Glacier (foot of map)

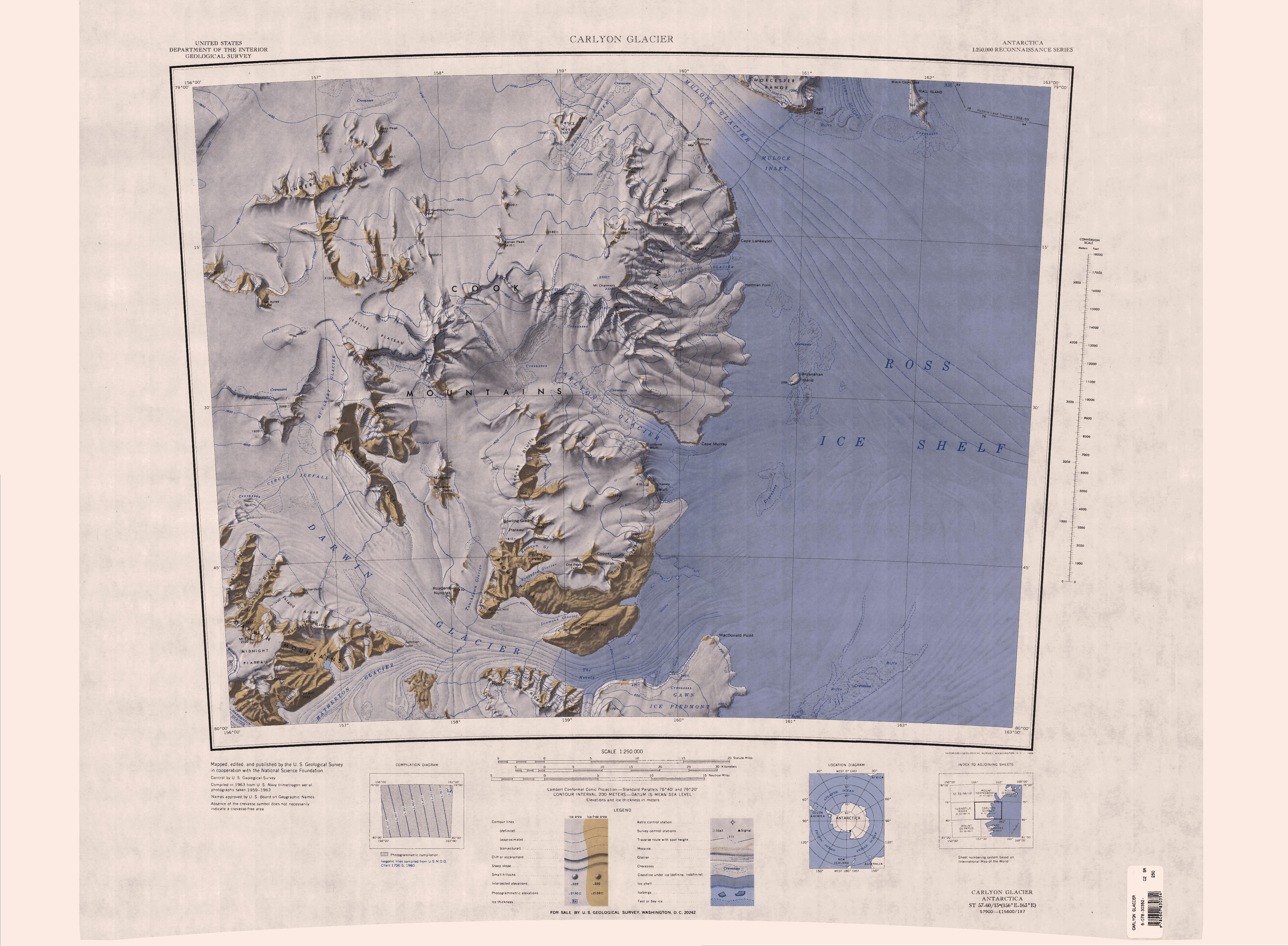
Mouth of Mulock Glacier (top of map)

=== Deception Glacier ===
78°33′S 158°33′E. Glacier between the Warren and Boomerang Ranges, flowing south into upper Mulock Glacier. So named by the New Zealand party of the Commonwealth Trans-Antarctic Expedition (CTAE) (1956–58) because it appears to lead directly into Skelton Névé but instead drains south ward.

=== Heap Glacier ===
78°03′S 159°20′E. Glacier 10 nautical miles (19 km; 12 mi) long flowing northeastward to Mulock Glacier, to the east of Henry Mesa. Mapped by the United States Geological Survey (USGS) from tellurometer surveys and Navy air photos, 1959–63. Named by Advisory Committee on Antarctic Names (US-ACAN f)or John A. Heap, a member of the University of Michigan-Ross Ice Shelf Studies party, 1962–63.

=== Kehle Glacier ===
78°56′S 160°18′E. Glacier draining the west slopes of Worcester Range in the vicinity of Mount Speyer and Mount Dawson-Lambton, and flowing southwest into Mulock Glacier. Named by US-ACAN in 1964 for Ralph Kehle, glaciologist at Little America V, 1959–60.

=== Evteev Glacier ===
78°57′S 161°12′E. Glacier flowing from the southeast slopes of the Worcester Range to the Ross Ice Shelf, west of Cape Timberlake. Named by US-ACAN in 1964 for Sveneld A. Evteev, glaciologist and Soviet exchange observer at McMurdo Station in 1960.

== Other features ==
=== Anthony Bluff ===
78°06′S 160°07′E. A conspicuous rock bluff along the south wall of Mulock Glacier, about 9 nautical miles (17 km; 10 mi) NW of Cape Lankester. Mapped by the USGS from tellurometer surveys and Navy air photos, 1959–63. Named by US-ACAN for Capt. Alexander Anthony, USAF, in charge of science and publications on the staff of the U.S. Antarctic Projects Officer, 1963–65.

=== Buntley Bluff ===
78°12′S 160°24′E. Prominent rock cliff 2 nautical miles (3.7 km; 2.3 mi) long, just northward of Cape Lankester at the mouth of Mulock Glacier. Mapped by the USGS from tellurometer surveys and Navy air photos, 1959–63. Named by US-ACAN for Ensign Ronald E. Buntley, CEC, USN, in charge of personnel at the air strip, Williams Field, McMurdo Sound in USN OpDFrz, 1964.

=== Cape Teall ===
78°03′S 161°04′E. A high, rocky cape forming the north side of the entrance to Mulock Inlet, along the west side of the Ross Ice Shelf. Discovered by the BrNAE (1901–04). Probably named for Sir Jethro Teall, Director of the Geological Survey and Museum of Practical Geology, of London, 1901–13. Not: Cape Teale.

=== Cape Lankester ===
78°16′S 160°29′E. A high, rounded, snow-covered cape at the south side of the entrance to Mulock Inlet, along the west edge of the Ross Ice Shelf. Discovered and named by the BrNAE (1901–04). Probably named for Sir Edwin Ray Lankester, Director of the Natural History Department of the British Museum (1898–1907) and founder of the Marine Biological Association in 1884.

=== Mulock Inlet ===
78°08′S 160°40′E. A re-entrant about 10 nautical miles (19 km; 12 mi) wide between Cape Teall and Cape Lankester. The feature is occupied by lower Mulock Glacier which drains through it to the Ross Ice Shelf. Discovered by the BrNAE (1901–04). Named for Lt. George F.A. Mulock, RN, surveyor with the expedition.

== Sources ==
- Alberts, Fred G., ed. (1995), Geographic Names of the Antarctic (PDF) (2 ed.), United States Board on Geographic Names This article incorporates public domain material from websites or documents of the United States Board on Geographic Names.
- Carlyon Glacier, USGS: United States Geological Survey
- Hughes, Terence; Zhao, Zihong; Hintz, Raymond; Fastook, James (2017), "Instability of the Antarctic Ross Sea Embayment as climate warms", Reviews of Geophysics, 55 (2): 277–585, doi:10.1002/2016RG000545
- Mount Harmsworth, USGS: United States Geological Survey
- Stearns, Leigh A. (2011), "Dynamics and mass balance of four large East Antarctic outlet glaciers", Annals of Glaciology, 52 (59), Cambridge University Press: 116–126, doi:10.3189/172756411799096187, hdl:1808/17210
- This article incorporates public domain material from websites or documents of the United States Geological Survey.
