= Butcher Ridge =

Ridge located in the Cook Mountains

ins
- Location within Antarctica

Highest point
- Coordinates: 79°12′S 155°48′E

Geography
- Continent: Antarctica
- Range coordinates: 79°25′S 158°00′E
- Parent range: Cook Mountains

Butcher Ridge (79°12′S 155°48′E) is a large, mainly ice-free ridge near the polar plateau in the west part of the Cook Mountains. The ridge is in the form of an arc, extending northwest from Mount Ayres. The Ridge peaks at 2,003 meters (6,572 feet). It was named by the Advisory Committee on Antarctic Names for Commander H.K. Butcher, U.S. Navy, air operations officer on the Staff of the U.S. Naval Support Force, Antarctica, during U.S. Navy Operation Deepfreeze 1963 and 1964.

== Geology ==
Butcher Ridge is a deeply eroded silicic igneous intrusion. It consists of a hypabyssal intrusion that contains rhythmically layered glassy rocks and plutonic rocks that vary in composition from basaltic andesite to rhyolite." U-Pb dating of baddeleyite from the Butcher Ridge yielded an age of about 182.4 Myr. This age confirms that this igneous complex was emplaced contemporaneously with the Ferrar large igneous province.

Faure and Mensing argue that the glassy and "pseudo-volcanic" rocks that compose the majority of the Butcher Ridge igneous complex are incompatible with it being a hypabyssal intrusion. Based on this and together with an associated strong magnetic anomaly and other features, they concluded that the Butcher Ridge igneous complex should be seriously investigated as a possible asteroid impact structure.

== Features ==
=== Gjelsvik Spur ===
79°18′S 156°19′E. A rock spur 2 nautical miles (4 km) northwest of Mount Ayres on the Butcher Ridge, in the Cook Mountains. It was named after Per Gjelsvik of the University of Wisconsin–Madison aeromagnetic project under John Behrendt, 1963–64. Working from U.S. Navy aircraft, Gjelsvik acquired aeromagnetic profiles over the Transantarctic Mountains bordering the Ross Sea and Ross Ice Shelf.

=== McCafferty Spur ===
79°17′S 156°4′E. A spur on the north face of Butcher Ridge, in the Cook Mountains of Antarctica, 5.5 nautical miles (10 km) northwest of Mount Ayres. It was named after Anne McCafferty, a geophysicist with the United States Geological Survey (USGS), who in 1991–92 worked on a USGS aeromagnetic survey over the Ross Ice Shelf and, in a cooperative USGS–German project, participated in the first aeromagnetic flight across the Butcher Ridge and Cook Mountains.

== Sources ==
- "Gjelsvik Spur", Geographic Names Information System, United States Geological Survey, United States Department of the Interior
- "McCafferty Spur", Geographic Names Information System, United States Geological Survey, United States Department of the Interior
