= Cook Mountains =

Group of mountains in Antarctica

ins
- Location within Antarctica

Geography
- Continent: Antarctica
- Range coordinates: 79°25′S 158°00′E
- Parent range: Transantarctic Mountains

The Cook Mountains (79°25′S 158°00′E) is a group of mountains bounded by the Mulock and Darwin glaciers in Antarctica. They are south of the Worcester Range and north of the Darwin Mountains and the Britannia Range.

== Early exploration and naming ==
Parts of the group were first viewed from the Ross Ice Shelf by the British National Antarctic Expedition (BrNAE) of 1901–04. Additional portions of these mountains were mapped by a New Zealand party of the Commonwealth Trans-Antarctic Expedition (CTAE) of 1956–58, and they were completely mapped by the United States Geological Survey (USGS) from tellurometer surveys and US Navy air photos, 1959–63. Named by the NZ-APC for Captain James Cook.

== Location ==
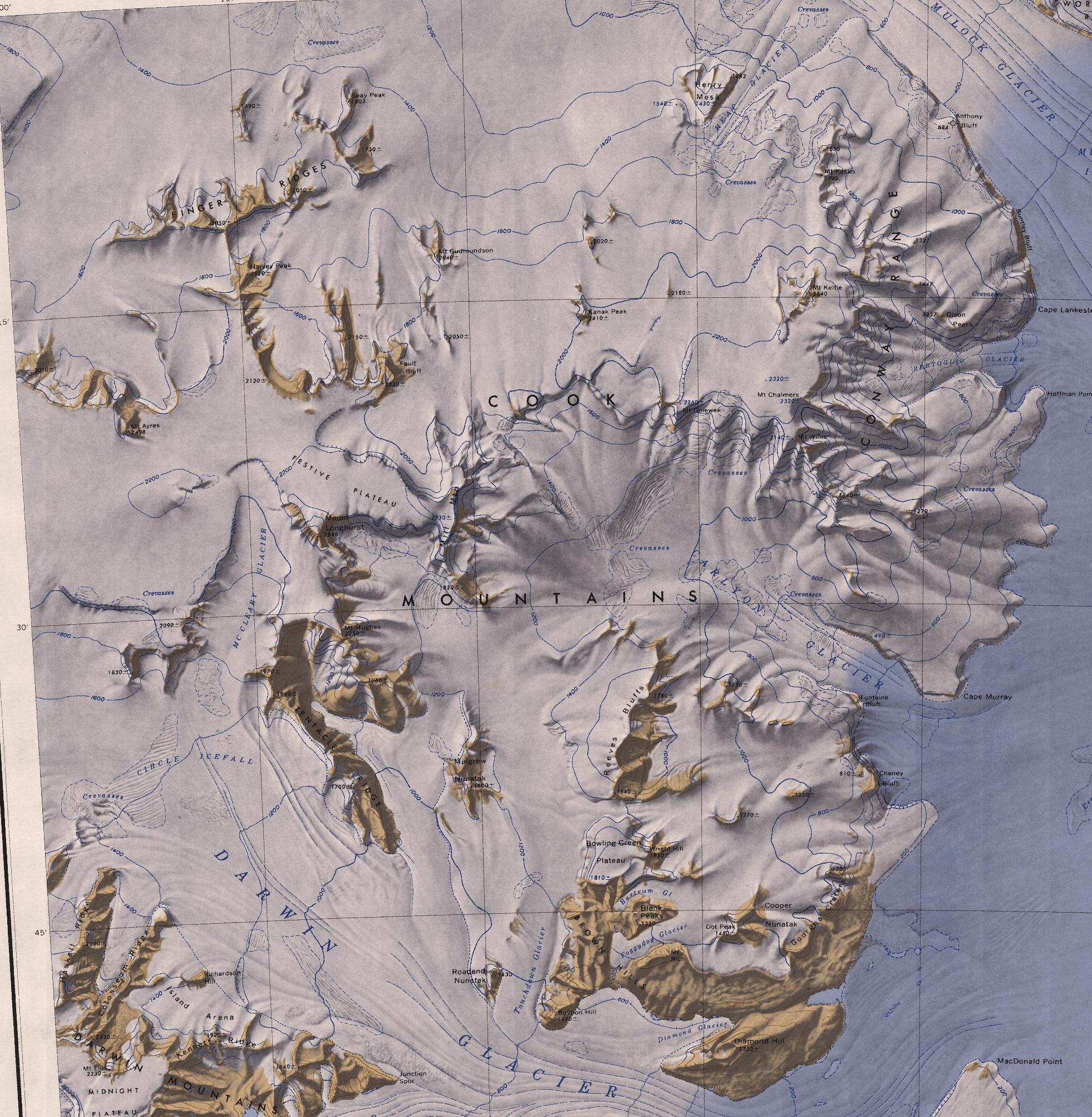
Cook Mountains

The Cook Mountains are bounded by the Darwin Glacier to the south, which separates the range from the Darwin Mountains. The Ross Ice Shelf lies to the east and the Mulock Glacier to the north, which separates it from the Worcester Range. To the west is the Darwin Névé and the Antarctic ice sheet.

== Glaciers ==
Glaciers leaving the mountains, clockwise from the north, are:

=== Heap Glacier ===
79°03′S 159°20′E. Glacier 10 miles (16 km) long flowing northeastward to Mulock Glacier, to the east of Henry Mesa. Mapped by the USGS from tellurometer surveys and Navy air photos, 1959-63. Named by US-AC AN for John A. Heap, a member of the University of Michigan-Ross Ice Shelf Studies party, 1962-63.

=== Bertoglio Glacier ===
79°18′S 160°20′E. Glacier 7 miles (11 km) long, flowing from the Conway Range eastward between Cape Lankester and Hoffman Point to the Ross Ice Shelf. Mapped by the USGS from tellurometer surveys and Navy air photos, 1959-63. Named by US-ACAN for Cdr. Lloyd W. Bertoglio, USN, commander of the McMurdo Station winter party, 1960.

=== Carlyon Glacier ===
79°34′S 159°50′E. A large glacier which flows east-south-east from the névé east of Mill Mountain to the Ross Ice Shelf at Cape Murray. Mapped in 1958 by the Darwin Glacier party of the CTAE (1956-58). Named by the NZ-APC for R.A. Carlyon, who with H.H. Ayres, made up the party.

=== Diamond Glacier ===
79°51′S 159°00′E. A small distributary glacier of the Darwin Glacier, flowing east-north-east into the narrow valley on the north side of Diamond Hill. Mapped by the VUWAE (1962-63) and named after Diamond Hill.

=== Touchdown Glacier ===
79°48′S 158°10′E. A tributary of Darwin Glacier, flowing south between Roadend Nunatak and the Brown Hills. Mapped by the VUWAE (1962-63) and so named because the glacier was used as a landing site for aircraft supporting the expedition.

=== McCleary Glacier ===
79°33′S 156°50′E. A broad glacier about 10 miles (16 km) long, draining southward into Darwin Glacier just west of Tentacle Ridge. Mapped by the USGS from tellurometer surveys and Navy air photos, 1959-63. Named by US-ACAN for George McCleary, public information officer on the staff of the U.S. Antarctic Projects Officer (1959-61), whose labors helped to start the Bulletin of the USAPO.

== Southeast massif features ==
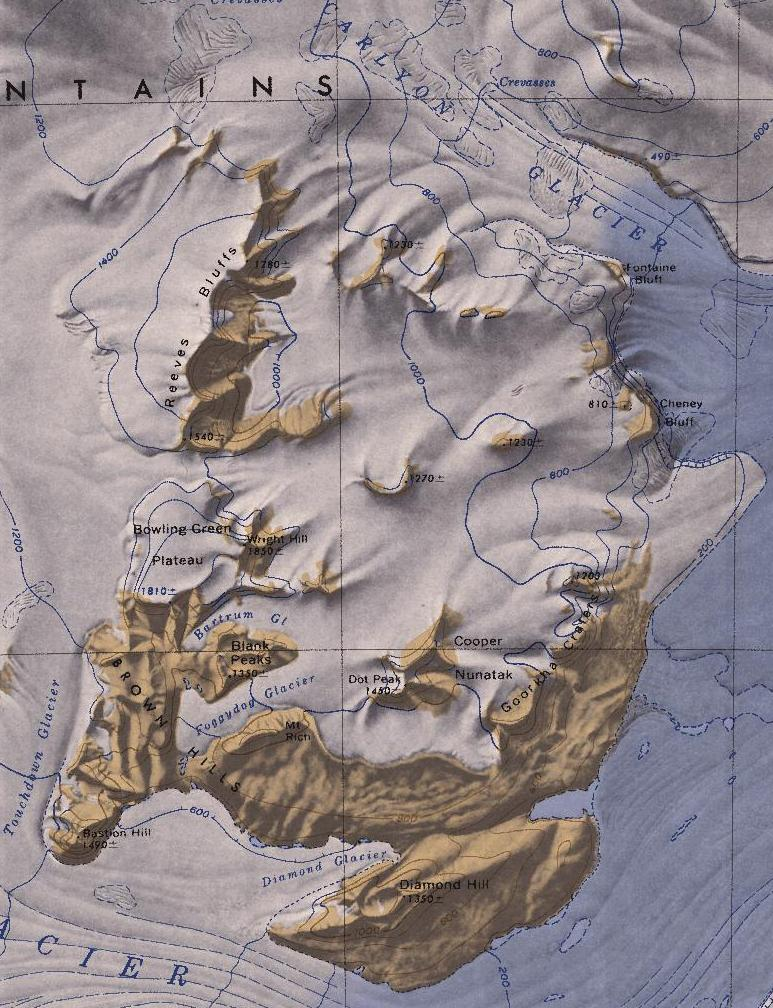
Southeast massif. Diamond Hill furthest south, below the long ridge of Brown Hills.

The southeast massif extends southwest from Carlyon Glacier to Darwin Glacier. The Ross Ice Shelf is to the East. Feature, from south to north, are:

=== Diamond Hill ===
79°52′S 159°09′E. A conspicuous snow-free hill which is diamond shape in plan, standing 10 miles (16 km) east of Bastion Hill at the north side of the lower Darwin Glacier. Named by the Darwin Glacier Party of the CTAE (1956-58) which surveyed this area.

=== Brown Hills ===
79°46′S 158°33′E. A group of mainly snow-free hills in the Cook Mountains, lying north of the lower reaches of Darwin Glacier. Named for their color by the Darwin Glacier Party of the Commonwealth Trans-Antarctic Expedition (CTAE) (1956-58).

=== Cooper Nunatak ===
79°45′S 159°11′E. A large rocky nunatak 5 miles (8.0 km) north of Diamond Hill, protruding through the ice east of the Brown Hills. Mapped by the VUWAE, 1962-63. Named for R.A. Cooper, geologist with the VUWAE, 1960-61.

=== Dot Peak ===
79°46′S 159°10′E. A small eminence, 1,450 metres (4,760 ft), marking the highest point of Cooper Nunatak, at the east side of the Brown Hills. Mapped by the VUWAE (1962-63) and so named because of its small size.

=== Schoonmaker Ridge ===
79°39′S 158°50′E. A jagged ridge, 4.5 nautical miles (8 km) long, that runs east from the south part of Reeves Plateau, Cook Mountains. Named by Advisory Committee on Antarctic Names (US-ACAN) after remote sensing scientist James W. (Bill) Schoonmaker, Jr., topographic engineer, United States Geological Survey (USGS). He spent three austral summers in Antarctica, 1972–76, with geodetic work at South Pole, Byrd Station, Antarctic Peninsula, Ellsworth Mountains and Ross Ice Shelf, where he determined the precise location of geophysical sites established during the Ross Ice Shelf Project, 1973-74 field season.

=== Soyuz-13 Rock ===
79°40′S 159°8′E. A nunatak, 1,270 metres (4,170 ft) high, located 2 nautical miles (3.7 km) southeast of Schoonmaker Ridge in the Cook Mountains. Named after the Soviet spacecraft Soyuz 13 of December 18, 1973.

=== Reeves Bluffs ===
79°36′S 158°40′E. A line of east-facing rock bluffs, 8 miles (13 km) long, situated 15 miles (24 km) west of Cape Murray in the Cook Mountains. Discovered by the BrNAE (1901-04) under Capt. Robert F. Scott, who gave the name "Mount Reeves," after Edward A. Reeves, Map Curator to the Royal Geographical Society, to a summit along this bluff. The bluff was mapped in detail by USGS from surveys and U.S. Navy aerial photography (1959-63). Since a prominent mountain does not rise from the bluffs, and because the name Mount Reeves is in use elsewhere in Antarctica, the US-ACAN (1965) recommended that the original name be amended and that the entire line of bluffs be designated as Reeves Bluffs. Not: Mount Reeves.

=== Cheney Bluff ===
79°39′S 159°48′E. A steep rock bluff at the south side of the mouth of Carlyon Glacier, 5 miles (8.0 km) southwest of Cape Murray. Mapped by the USGS from tellurometer surveys and Navy air photos, 1959-63. Named by US-AC AN for Lt. Cdr. D.J. Cheney, RNZN, commander of HMNZS Rotoiti on ocean station duty between Christchurch and McMurdo Sound, 1963-64.

=== Soyuz-18 Rock ===
79°39′S 159°25′E. A distinctive nunatak 3 nautical miles (6 km) west of Cheney Bluff in the Cook Mountains. The feature rises to 1,230 metres (4,040 ft) and is pyramid shaped, especially when viewed from the west. Named after the Soviet spacecraft Soyuz 18 of May 24, 1975.

=== Fontaine Bluff ===
79°35′S 159°42′E. Bluff 4 miles (6.4 km) west of Cape Murray on the south side of Carlyon Glacier. Mapped by the USGS from tellurometer surveys and Navy air photos, 1959-63. Named by US-ACAN for Lt. Cdr. R.K. Fontaine, USN, commander of USS Hissem on ocean station duty in support of aircraft flights between Christchurch and McMurdo Sound, 1963-64.

== Conway Range ==
79°16′S 159°30′E. A range in the Cook Mountains between Mulock and Carlyon Glaciers. The range was discovered by the BrNAE (1901-04), but the name appears to be first used in the reports of the BrAE (1907-09).

== Western Features ==
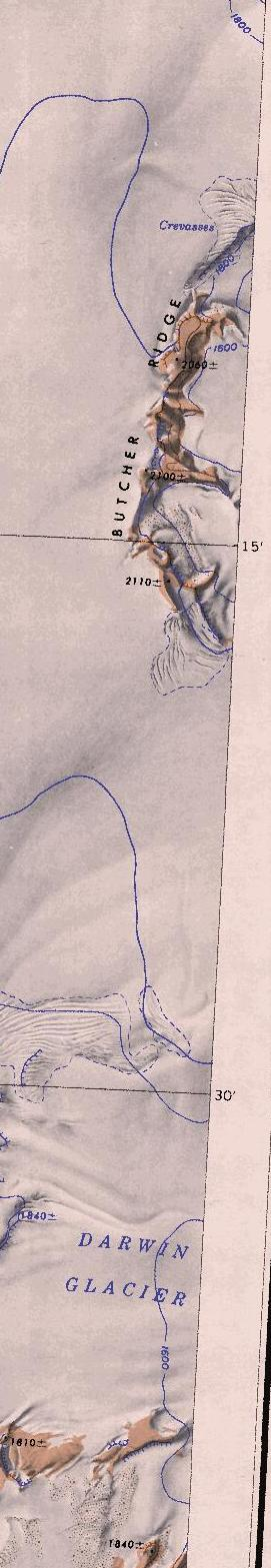
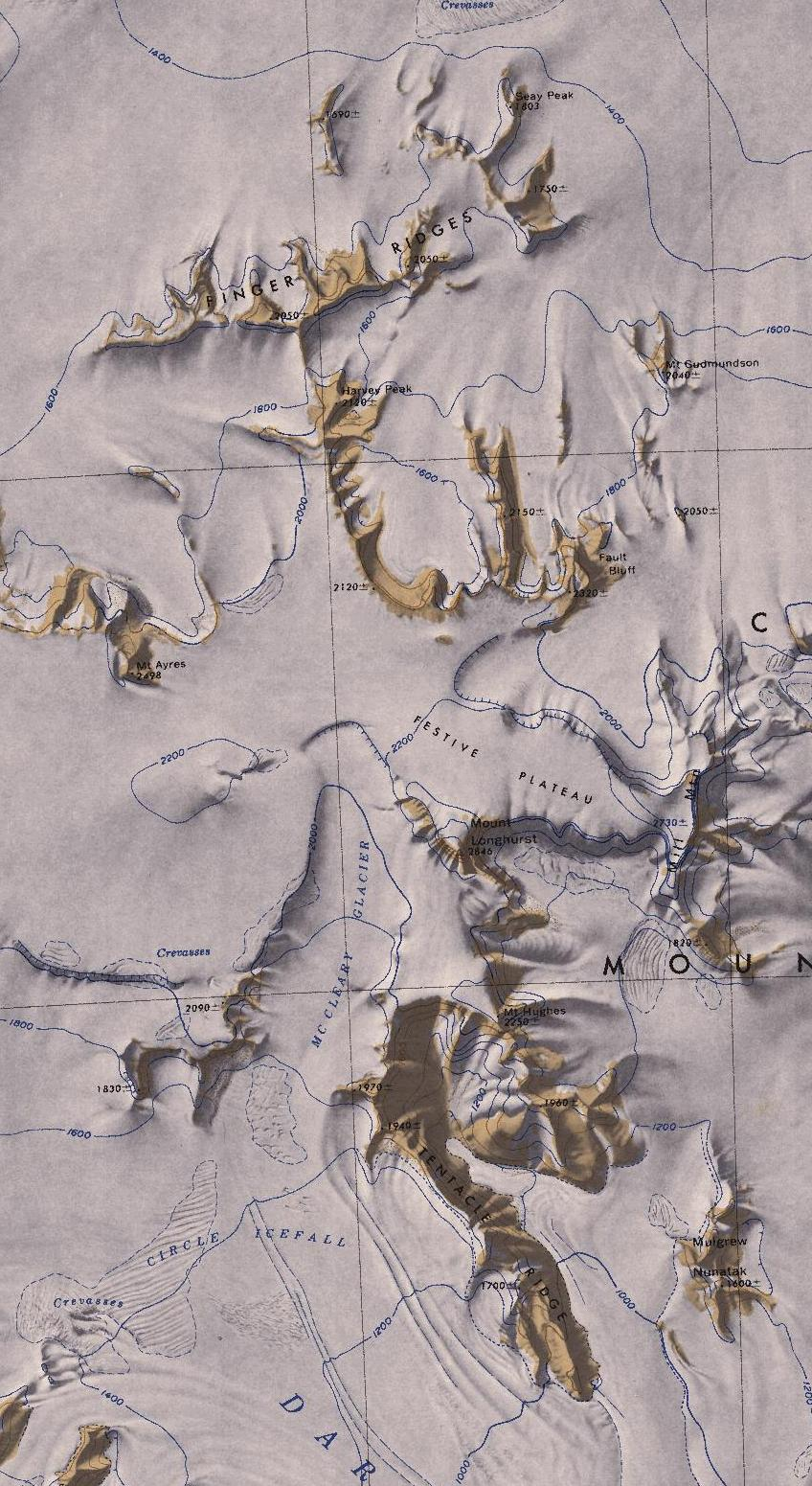
1:250,000 scale maps of western mountains

=== Festive Plateau ===
79°24′S 157°30′E. An ice-covered plateau over 2,200 metres (7,200 ft) high, about 10 by 3 miles (16.1 by 4.8 km), just north of Mount Longhurst in the Cook (Note: Alberts 1995 states the plateau is in the Churchill Mountains. This is clearly an error, which is repeated by the USGS in their GNIS database.) Mountains. Named by two members of the Darwin Glacier Party of the CTAE (1956-58) who spent Christmas Day 1957 on the plateau.

=== Mill Mountain ===
79°26′S 157°52′E. A large flat-topped mountain (2,730 m) forming the eastern end of Festive Plateau. This mountain was probably sighted by the BrNAE (1901-04) under Capt. Robert F. Scott, who gave the name "Mount Mill," after British Antarctic historian Hugh Robert Mill, to a summit in nearby Reeves Bluffs. This area was mapped by USGS from surveys and U.S. Navy photography (1959-63). A prominent mountain does not rise from the bluffs, and since the name Mount Mill is in use elsewhere in Antarctica, the US-ACAN (1965) altered the original name to Mill Mountain and applied it to the prominent mountain described.

=== Bromwich Terrace ===
79°28′S 157°13′E. A high relatively flat ice-capped area of about 7 square miles (18 km^{2}). It lies between Festive Plateau and Mount Longhurst on the north, and Starbuck Cirque and Mount Hughes on the south. At 2,000 metres (6,600 ft) elevation, the terrace is 200 metres (660 ft) below the adjoining Festive Plateau and 850 metres (2,800 ft) below towering Mount Longhurst. It was named after David H. Bromwich of the Polar Meteorology Group, Byrd Polar Research Center, Ohio State University, who carried out climatological investigations of Antarctica for over 20 years beginning about 1978.

=== Starbuck Cirque ===
79°33′S 157°14′E) A remarkable cirque, 4 miles (6.4 km) wide, between the base of Tentacle Ridge and Mount Hughes. Named by Advisory Committee on Antarctic Names (US-ACAN) after Michael J. Starbuck, United States Geological Survey (USGS) cartographer who, with Roger A. Barlow, operated the seismometer and Doppler satellite receiving stations at South Pole, winter 1992; member of US-NZ field team in a program to combine US and NZ geodetic networks in the McMurdo Dry Valleys area, summer 1996–97.

=== Felder Peak ===
(79°33′S 157°0′E) Felder Peak is a 1,970 metres (6,460 ft) peak between the terminus of McCleary Glacier and the west side of Starbuck Cirque.

=== Mount Ayres ===
79°20′S 156°28′E. A prominent mountain, 2,500 metres (8,200 ft) high, lying 10 miles (16 km) south of the west end of the Finger Ridges. Climbed in December 1957 by the Darwin Glacier Party of the CTAE (1956-58). Named for H.H. Ayres, one of the two men comprising the Darwin Glacier Party.

=== Finn Spur ===
79°17′S 156°37′E. A rock spur 3.5 nautical miles (6 km) northeast of Mount Ayres on the north side of Longhurst Plateau. It was named after Carol Finn, a geophysicist with the United States Geological Survey (USGS), who was USGS project chief on a cooperative USGS–German aeromagnetic survey over the Butcher Ridge – Cook Mountains – Darwin Névé area, 1997–98, and also performed additional aeromagnetic surveys from 1991, including seasons over the West Antarctic ice sheet from 1994 as a principal investigator and USGS project chief.

=== Butcher Ridge ===
79°12′S 155°48′E. A large, mainly ice-free ridge near the polar plateau in the west part of the Cook Mountains. The ridge is in the form of an arc, extending northwest from Mount Ayres. Named by US-ACAN for Cdr. H.K. Butcher, USN, air operations officer on the Staff of the U.S. Naval Support Force, Antarctica, during USN OpDFrz 1963 and 1964.

=== Fault Bluff ===
79°18′S 157°40′E. A notable rock bluff. 2,320 metres (7,610 ft) high, situated 9 miles (14 km) northeast of Mount Longhurst. The feature was visited in the 1957-58 season by members of the Darwin Glacier Party of the CTAE, 1956-58. They applied the name which presumably refers to a geological fault at the bluff.

=== Finger Ridges ===
79°11′S 157°00′E. Several mainly ice-free ridges and spurs extending over a distance of about 12 miles (19 km), east-west, in the northwest part of the Cook Mountains. The individual ridges are 1 to 2 miles (1.6 to 3.2 km) long and project northward from the higher main ridge. Mapped by the USGS from tellurometer surveys and Navy air photos, 1959-63. The descriptive name was given by the US-ACAN.

=== Mount Gudmundson ===
79°13′S 157°51′E. A mainly ice-free mountain, 2,040 m, standing 6 miles (9.7 km) northeast of Fault Bluff. Mapped by the USGS from tellurometer surveys and Navy air photos, 1959-63. Named by US-ACAN for Julian P. Gudmundson (BUG), USN, explosive expert who wintered at Little America V in 1957. He blasted the foundation for the nuclear power plant at McMurdo Station during USNOpDFrz, 1961.

=== Harvey Peak ===
79°13′S 157°01′E. An ice-free peak, 2,120 metres (6,960 ft) high, standing 2 miles (3.2 km) south of the Finger Ridges. Mapped by the USGS from tellurometer surveys and Navy air photos, 1959-63. Named by US-ACAN for Paul Harvey, a member of the U.S. Army aviation support unit for Topo North and Topo South (1961-62) which conducted the tellurometer surveys.

=== Mount Hughes ===
79°31′S 157°23′E. A mountain, 2,250 metres (7,380 ft) hugh, midway between Mount Longhurst and Tentacle Ridge. Discovered by the BrNAE (1901-04) and named for J.F. Hughes, an Honorary Secretary of the Royal Geographical Society, who helped in the preparation for the expedition.

=== Mount Longhurst ===
79°26′S 157°18′E. A prominent mountain, 2,845 metres (9,334 ft), standing west of Mill Mountain and forming the highest point of Festive Plateau. Discovered by the BrNAE (1901-04) and named for Cyril Longhurst, secretary of the expedition.

=== Longhurst Plateau ===
79°23′S 156°20′E. A narrow, snow-covered extension of the polar plateau located just west of Mount Longhurst. Rising to 2,200 metres (7,200 ft), it is about 20 miles (32 km) long and 10 miles (16 km) wide, and is bounded on the south by upper Darwin Glacier and on the east by McCleary Glacier. The plateau was traversed by the Darwin Glacier Party of the CTAE in 1957-58, who named it for nearby Mount Longhurst.

=== DeZafra Ridge ===
79°17′S 157°27′E. A narrow but prominent rock ridge, 5 nautical miles (9 km) long, which extends north from the northeast cliffs of Longhurst Plateau. The ridge is 2.5 nautical miles (5 km) west of Fault Bluff and rises 350 metres (1,150 ft) above then ice surface north of the plateau. It was named after Robert L. deZafra, Professor of Physics at the State University of New York, Stony Brook, whose research at the South Pole and McMurdo Sound provided breakthrough contributions to understanding the formation of the Antarctic ozone hole.

== Isolated features ==
Isolated features in or near the range include:

=== Henry Mesa ===
79°05′S 159°04′E. A distinctive wedge-shaped mesa 2 miles (3.2 km) in extent, standing 4 miles (6.4 km) south of Mulock Glacier on the west side of Heap Glacier. The ice-covered summit, 1,430 metres (4,690 ft) high, is flat except for a cirque which indents the north side. Mapped by the USGS from tellurometer surveys and Navy air photos, 1959-63. Named by US-ACAN for Capt. B.R. Henry, USCG, commander of the Eastwind USN OpDFrz, 1964, and commander of the U.S. ship group, OpDFrz, 1965.

=== Kanak Peak ===
79°16′S 158°30′E. Conspicuous ice-free peak, 2,410 metres (7,910 ft) high, standing 6 miles (9.7 km) northwest of Mount Gniewek and north of the head of Carlyon Glacier in the Cook Mountains. Mapped by USGS from tellurometer surveys and Navy air photos, 1959-63. Named by US-ACAN for Lt. Cdr. R.A. Kanak, USN, commander of USS Durant on ocean station duty in support of aircraft flights between Christchurch and McMurdo Sound in USN OpDFrz 1963.

=== Mulgrew Nunatak ===
79°38′S 157°56′E. A prominent nunatak, 1,600 metres (5,200 ft) high, standing 4 miles (6.4 km) east of Tentacle Ridge in the Cook Mountains. Mapped by the Darwin Glacier Party of the CTAE (1956-58) and named for P.O. Mulgrew, chief radio operator at Scott Base, who accompanied Sir Edmund Hillary to the South Pole.

=== Peter Crest ===
79.65°S 157.95°E The summit (1,600 metres (5,200 ft) high) of Mulgrew Nunatak in the Cook Mountains. Named after New Zealand Antarctic veteran Peter D. Mulgrew. He perished in the Air New Zealand DC10 scenic flight to Ross Island, Nov. 28, 1979, when the airplane crashed near Te Puna Roimata Peak (spring of tears peak) on the northeast slope of Mount Erebus, killing all 257 persons aboard.

== Sources ==
- Alberts, Fred G., ed. (1995), Geographic Names of the Antarctic (PDF) (2 ed.), United States Board on Geographic Names This article incorporates public domain material from websites or documents of the United States Board on Geographic Names.
- "Bromwich Terrace", Geographic Names Information System, United States Geological Survey, United States Department of the Interior
- Carlyon Glacier, USGS United States Geologic Survey, 1960
- "DeZafra Ridge", Geographic Names Information System, United States Geological Survey, United States Department of the Interior
- "Festive Plateau", Geographic Names Information System, United States Geological Survey, United States Department of the Interior
- "Finn Spur", Geographic Names Information System, United States Geological Survey, United States Department of the Interior
- "Peter Crest", Geographic Names Information System, United States Geological Survey, United States Department of the Interior
- "Schoonmaker Ridge", Geographic Names Information System, United States Geological Survey, United States Department of the Interior
- "Soyuz-13 Rock", Geographic Names Information System, United States Geological Survey, United States Department of the Interior
- "Soyuz-18 Rock", Geographic Names Information System, United States Geological Survey, United States Department of the Interior
- "Starbuck Cirque", Geographic Names Information System, United States Geological Survey, United States Department of the Interior
- Turnstyle Ridge, USGS
