= Ravens Mountains =

Mountains in Antarctica

- Location within Antarctica

Geography
- Location: Antarctica
- Parent range: Britannia Range

Ravens Mountains (80°20′S 155°25′E) is a symmetrical group of mountains on the west side of Hughes Basin in Britannia Range, Antarctica. The mountains are 12 nautical miles (22 km; 14 mi) long and rise to 2,130 metres (6,990 ft) in Doll Peak.

== Name ==
The Ravens Mountains were named after the 109th Airlift Wing of the New York Air National Guard which has provided logistical support to the United States Antarctic Program (USAP) for several years beginning in 1988. Ravens is a nickname associated with the Airlift Wing.

== Location ==
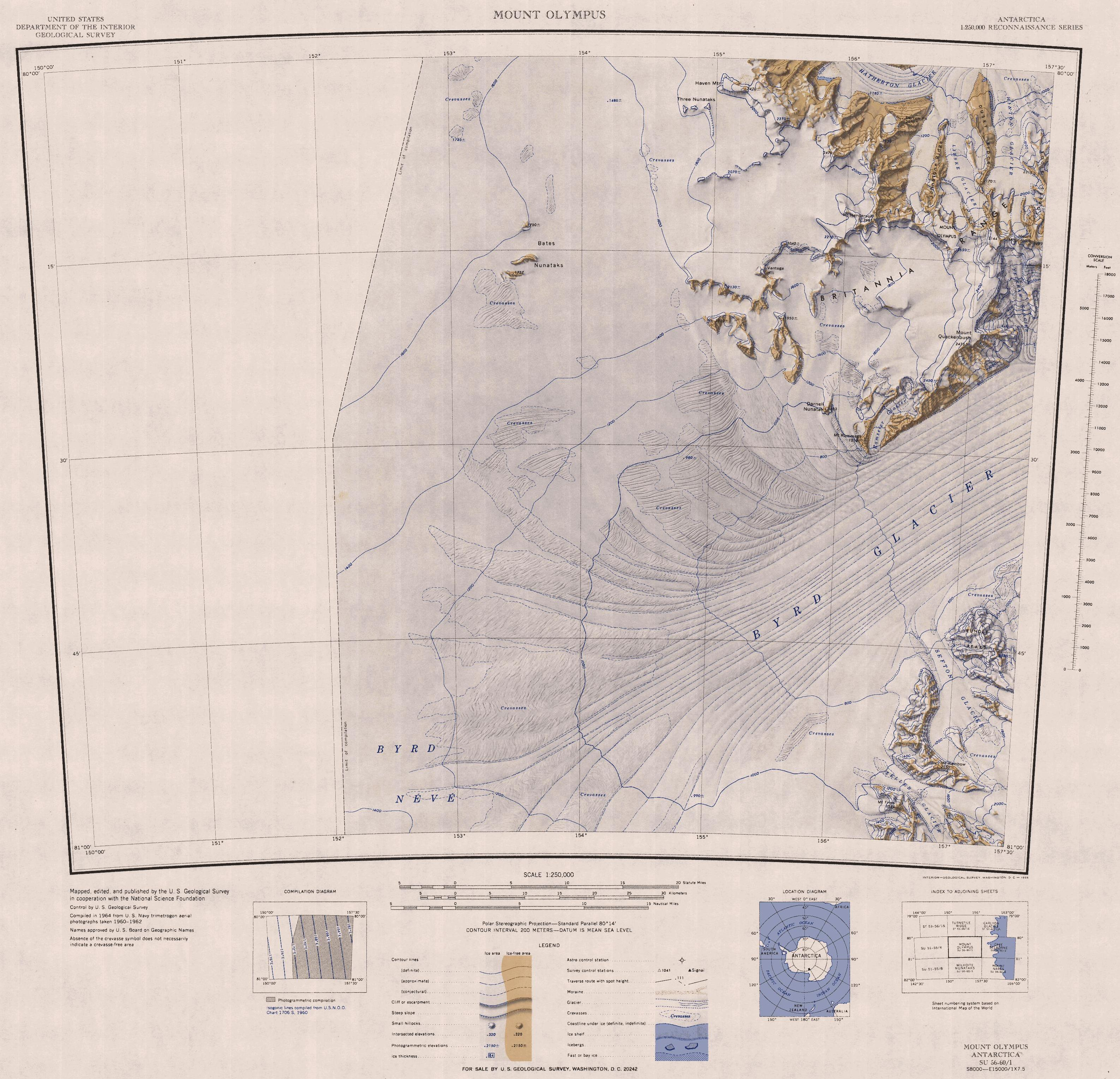
Mount Olympus towards northeast

The Ravens Mountains are to the east of Hughes Basin, a large basinlike névé which is bounded except to the south by Ravens Mountains, Mount Henderson, Mount Olympus and Mount Quackenbush. Mount Henderson is to the northeast and Darnell Nunatak is to the southeast. Bates Nunataks are to the west.

== Features ==
=== Aldi Peak ===
80.2833333°S 154.8333333°E. A peak rising to 1,800 metres (5,900 ft) high at the west end of the Ravens Mountains. Named after Chief Master Sergeant Louis M. Aldi who served as the 109 Airlift Wing Command Chief Master Sergeant during the transition of LC-130 operations from the United States Navy to the Air National Guard.

=== Saburro Peak ===
80.3333333°S 155.0166667°E. A peak to the south of Doll Peak, rising to 1,930 metres (6,330 ft) high in the south part of Ravens Mountains. Named after Colonel Richard M. Saburro, Commanding Officer of the 109 Airlift Wing, New York Air National Guard, who was the first Guard commander for Operation Deep Freeze.

=== Doll Peak ===
80.3°S 155.1°E. A peak rising to 2,130 metres (6,990 ft) high in the northwest part of the Ravens Mountains. Named after Brigadier General Karl H. Doll, who served as Director of Operations of the 109 Tactical Airlift Group and was instrumental in early transition planning of the LC-130 operations from the United States Navy to the Air National Guard.

=== Stahl Peak ===
80.3333333°S 155.2166667°E. A peak 2 nautical miles (3.7 km; 2.3 mi) east of Saburro Peak in the Ravens Mountains. It rises to over 1,800 metres (5,900 ft). Named after Chief Master Sergeant Alfred E. Stahl who served with the 109 Airlift Wing as a Flight Engineer Superintendent during the transition of LC-130 operations from the United States Navy to the Air National Guard.

=== Pritchard Peak ===
80.3666667°S 155.3°E. A peak rising to over 1,800 metres (5,900 ft) high 3 nautical miles (5.6 km; 3.5 mi) southeast of Saburro Peak in the Doll Mountains. Named after Colonel Marion Graham Pritchard, Jr., who served as Vice Commander and then Commander of the 109 Airlift Wing during the transition of LC-130 operations from the United States Navy to the Air National Guard.

=== Casatelli Peak ===
80.3666667°S 155.5166667°E. A peak 2 nautical miles (3.7 km; 2.3 mi) east of Pritchard Peak. It rises to about 1,600 metres (5,200 ft) high at the end of the west ridge that descends from Adams Crest. Named after Chief Master Sergeant Michael F. Casatelli who served with the 109 Airlift Wing as Medical Administration Supervisor during the transition of LC-130 operations from the United States Navy to the Air National Guard.

=== Adams Crest ===
80.3333333°S 155.55°E. The summit, 1,950 metres (6,400 ft) high, of an irregular V-shaped mountain 5 nautical miles (9.3 km; 5.8 mi) east of Saburro Peak Named after Colonel Jonathan E. Adams who served as Commander of the 109 Airlift Wing during the transition of LC-130 operations from the United States Navy to the Air National Guard.

=== Lucia Peak ===
80.3°S 155.3833333°E. A peak 2 nautical miles (3.7 km; 2.3 mi) northwest of Adams Crest. Named after CMSgt Charles R. Lucia who served with the 109 Airlift Wing as Chief of Maintenance Control during the transition of LC-130 operations from the United States Navy to the Air National Guard.

=== Beale Peak ===
80.3°S 155.5°E. A peak 2 nautical miles (3.7 km; 2.3 mi) southeast of Vantage Hill. Named after Master Sergeant Garry(sp?) A. Beale who served as the 109 Airlift Wing Logistics Planner during the transition of LC-130 operations from the United States Navy to the Air National Guard.

== Nearby features ==
=== Brier Icefalls ===
80.25°S 155.6°E Icefalls about 150 metres (490 ft) high and 5 nautical miles (9.3 km; 5.8 mi) wide at the east side of Vantage Hill. Named after Frank Brier of the Office of Polar Programs, NSF, Facilities, Engineering and Construction Program Manager for renovation of facilities at McMurdo and for South Pole Station Modernization, 1995-2001.

=== Sullivan Knoll ===
80.2169444°S 155.0169444°E A lone nunatak midway between Marty Nunataks and Raven Mountains. Named by US-ACAN (2009) after Paul J. Sullivan, Electronics Technician in support of the United States Antarctic Program at McMurdo Station, 1994–95 and 1995-96 austral field seasons; Cryogenics Technician, Amundsen-Scott South Pole Station, 1996-2009 austral field seasons, including one winter; Manager of South Pole Science Support, 2009.

=== Marty Nunataks ===
80.1438889°S 155.2263889°E A group comprising about six nunataks in the west part of Britannia Range. The group lies midway between Haven Mountain and Vantage Hill and extends east–west for 7.5 nautical miles (13.9 km; 8.6 mi). The nunataks rise to over 2,000 metres (6,600 ft); local relief is on the order of 200 metres (660 ft). Named after Jerry W. Marty, involved in Antarctica from 1969, first as a construction manager for the South Pole Station characterized by the iconic geodesic dome; from 1994-1998 engaged in on-site contract support to the Office of Polar Programs, NSF, associated with planning for modernization of South Pole Station; from 1998-2009 as Facilities Construction and Maintenance Manager at the NSF for South Pole Station Modernization and as NSF Representative South Pole.

=== Vantage Hill ===
80°16′S 155°22′E. A flat-topped hill, over 2,000 metres (6,600 ft) high above sea level and 300 metres (980 ft) high above the surrounding plateau, standing 10 nautical miles (19 km; 12 mi) southwest of Mount Henderson. This is the most southerly point reached by the Darwin Glacier Party of the Commonwealth Trans-Antarctic Expedition (CTAE) (1957–58), who gave it this name because of the splendid view it afforded.

== Sources ==
- "Adams Crest", Geographic Names Information System, United States Geological Survey, United States Department of the Interior
- Alberts, Fred G., ed. (1995), Geographic Names of the Antarctic (PDF) (2 ed.), United States Board on Geographic Names This article incorporates public domain material from websites or documents of the United States Board on Geographic Names.
- "Aldi Peak", Geographic Names Information System, United States Geological Survey, United States Department of the Interior
- "Beale Peak", Geographic Names Information System, United States Geological Survey, United States Department of the Interior
- "Brier Icefalls", Geographic Names Information System, United States Geological Survey, United States Department of the Interior
- "Casatelli Peak", Geographic Names Information System, United States Geological Survey, United States Department of the Interior
- "Doll Peak", Geographic Names Information System, United States Geological Survey, United States Department of the Interior
- "Hughes Basin", Geographic Names Information System, United States Geological Survey, United States Department of the Interior
- "Lucia Peak", Geographic Names Information System, United States Geological Survey, United States Department of the Interior
- "Marty Nunataks", Geographic Names Information System, United States Geological Survey, United States Department of the Interior
- Mount Olympus, USGS United States Geologic Survey, 1960
- "Pritchard Peak", Geographic Names Information System, United States Geological Survey, United States Department of the Interior
- "Ravens Mountains", Geographic Names Information System, United States Geological Survey, United States Department of the Interior
- "Saburro Peak", Geographic Names Information System, United States Geological Survey, United States Department of the Interior
- "Stahl Peak", Geographic Names Information System, United States Geological Survey, United States Department of the Interior
- "Sullivan Knoll", Geographic Names Information System, United States Geological Survey, United States Department of the Interior

This article incorporates public domain material from websites or documents of the United States Geological Survey.
