= Michael Selby =

New Zealand geologist (1936–2018)

Michael Selby ONZM
- Born: Michael John Selby; 13 January 1936; Luton, Bedfordshire, England
- Died: 21 January 2018 (aged 82)
- Education: Keble College, Oxford; University of Waikato
- Scientific career
- Fields: Geomorphology
- Workplaces: University of Waikato
- Thesis: Runoff, infiltration and soil erodibility studies in the Otutira catchment (1971)

Michael John Selby ONZM (13 January 1936 – 21 January 2018) was a New Zealand geomorphologist, academic, and university administrator. Mount Selby in Antarctica's Britannia Range is named for him.

== Biography ==
Born in Luton, Bedfordshire, England, on 13 January 1936, Selby studied at Keble College, Oxford, gaining a BA(Hons), MA, and DipEd.

Selby came to New Zealand on the RMS Rangitata in 1960, and was appointed as a junior lecturer at the Waikato branch of the University of Auckland. On the establishment of the University of Waikato in 1964, he joined the new Department of Geography, and then the Department of Earth Sciences when it was formed in 1970. The following year, he completed a DPhil: the title of his doctoral thesis was Runoff, infiltration and soil erodibility studies in the Otutira catchment. He was later awarded a Doctor of Science degree from the University of Oxford on the basis of his research linking concepts in geomorphology with quantitative measurements in engineering geology.

Selby took part in either three or four field expeditions to Antarctica, including in 1968–69, 1971–72, and 1978–79. On the first of these, he became the first geomorphologist to travel to Antarctica. The 1978–79 trip to the Britannia Range–Darwin Glacier region was led by Selby, and mapped exposures in the McCraw Glacier area, and discovered iron meteorites on Derrick Peak. Selby also made expeditions to the Sahara, Namib, and Atacama Deserts, as well as to the Himalayas and Colorado. He also visited the Eastern Mediterranean after developing a research interest in archaeology and human evolution and dispersion. In 1980, Selby was appointed as a professor of earth sciences at Waikato. During his academic career, he wrote six books and more than 80 refereed scientific papers.

In the later part of his career, Selby was part of the senior administrative team at Waikato, and served as deputy vice-chancellor (research). He took part in the Treaty of Waitangi negotiations with Waikato Tainui relating to the ownership of the university campus. On his retirement from Waikato in 2002, Selby was granted the title of emeritus professor. He continued to serve the university as chair of the University of Waikato Foundation and as a director of companies commercialising research at the university.

Selby became a naturalised New Zealander in 1980. He died on 21 January 2018.

== Honours and honorific eponym ==
In the 2005 New Year Honours, Selby was appointed an Officer of the New Zealand Order of Merit, for services to education.

A peak in the Britannia Range in Antarctica was named Mount Selby, in honour of Selby, by the New Zealand Antarctic Placenames Committee.

== Selected works ==
- Selby, Michael (1967). The surface of the Earth (2 volumes). London: Cassell.
- Selby, Michael (1982). Hillslope materials and processes. Oxford University Press. ISBN 019874126X.
- Selby, Michael (1985). Earth's changing surface: an introduction to geomorphology. Oxford: Clarendon. ISBN 0198232527.
