= Gaussiran Glacier =

Glacier in Antarctica

- Location within Antarctica
- Location: Oates Land
- Coordinates: 80°00′S 159°10′E
- Thickness: unknown
- Terminus: Darwin Glacier
- Status: unknown

Gaussiran Glacier is a glacier in the eastern part of the Britannia Range, Antarctica. It drains north from the saddle with Merrick Glacier to a juncture with Darwin Glacier between the Cranfield Icefalls and the Nebraska Peaks. It is separated from Alley Glacier by a series of large rock buttresses, including Robertson Buttress.

It was named by the Advisory Committee on Antarctic Names after Lieutenant C.D. Gaussiran, U.S. Navy, a pilot with the VXE-6 detachment at Darwin Glacier Field Camp, 1978–79.

== See also ==
- List of glaciers in the Antarctic
- Glaciology
