= Gaylord Ridge =

Gaylord Ridge (80°2′S 159°16′E) is a solitary north–south ridge, 2 nautical miles (4 km) long, located 3 nautical miles (6 km) northwest of Eilers Peak in the western part of the Nebraska Peaks. It was named by the Advisory Committee on Antarctic Names after D.R. Gaylord of the University of Nebraska, a member of the United States Antarctic Research Program glaciological team during the Ross Ice Shelf Project, 1973–74 field season.

== See also ==
- Kirchner Peak
