= Hughes Basin =

- Location within Antarctica
- Coordinates: 80.3166667°S 156.3°E
- Terminus: Byrd Glacier

Hughes Basin (80.3166667°S 156.3°E) is a large basinlike névé which is bounded except to the south by the Ravens Mountains, Mount Henderson, Mount Olympus and Mount Quackenbush. The feature is 15 nautical miles (28 km; 17 mi) long and the ice surface descends north–south from 2,000 metres (6,600 ft) near Mount Olympus to 1,000 metres (3,300 ft) near Darnell Nunatak, where there is discharge to Byrd Glacier.

== Name ==
Hughes Basin was named after Terence J. Hughes of the Department of Geological Sciences and Institute of Quaternary Studies, University of Maine, Orono, who made an intensive study of the Byrd Glacier, 1978–79, entailing photogrammetric determination of the elevation of the ice surface and its velocity, radio-echo sounding from LC-130 aircraft, and ground survey from fixed stations close to Byrd Glacier and moving stations on the glacier itself.

== Location ==
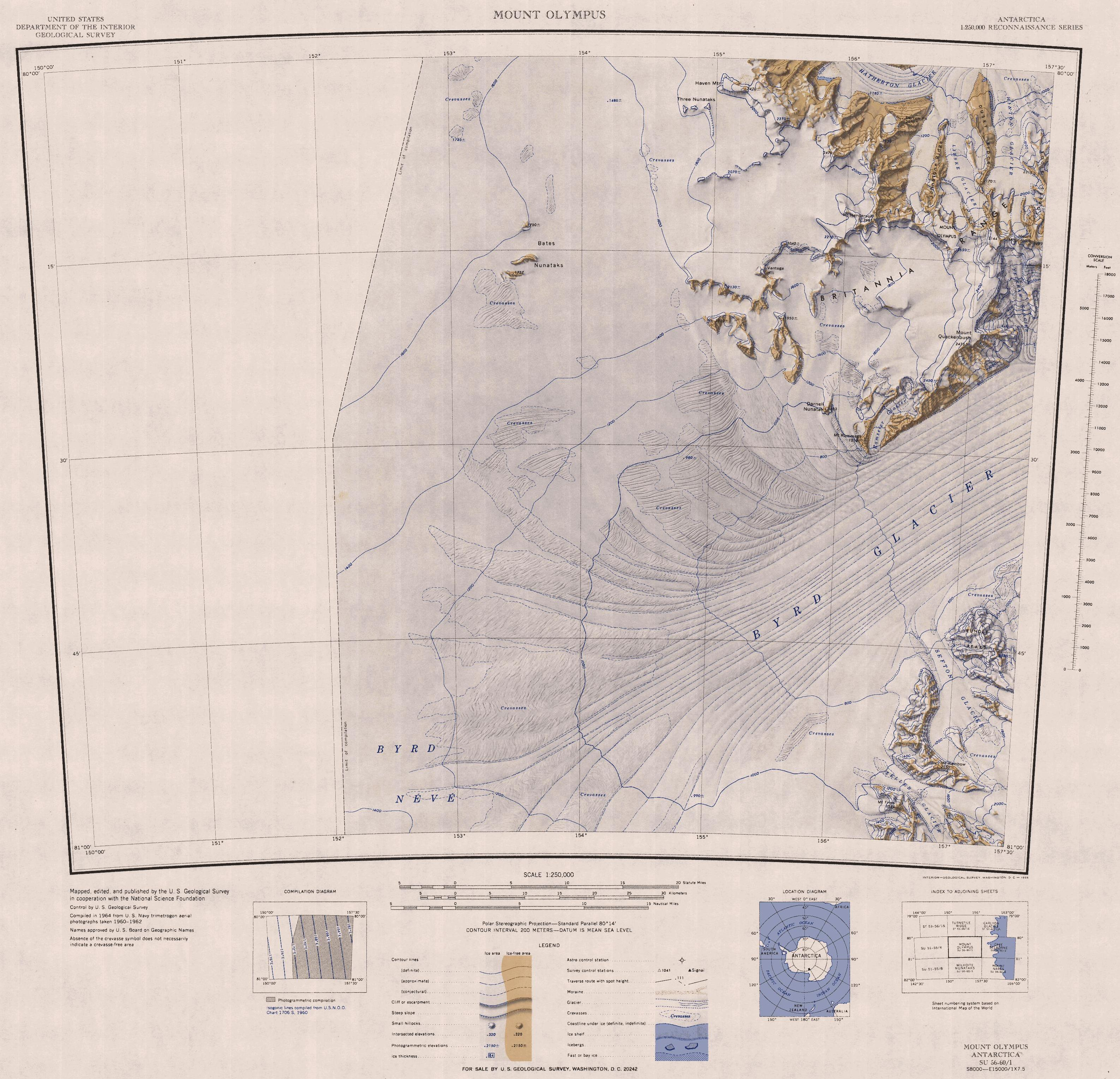
Hughes Basin towards the northeast

Hughes Basin is a large circular feature in the southwest of the Britannia Range to the south of Mount Henderson. Features in or surrounding the névé include Mount Henderson, Mount Olympus, Mount Quackenbush, Mount Rummage, Darnell Nunatak and the Ravens Mountains.

== Features ==
=== Menster Ledge ===
80.3°S 156.3833333°E A relatively level benchlike feature which rises to 1,800 metres (5,900 ft) high, 6 nautical miles (11 km; 6.9 mi) southwest of Mount Olympus in Hughes Basin. The feature is 2.5 nautical miles (4.6 km; 2.9 mi) wide and is smoothly ice covered in the central and north portions; an abrupt ice and rock cliff forms the south end of the ledge. Named after Chaplain William J. Menster (Commander, U.S. Navy) of the flagship Mount Olympus in Operation Deep Freeze, 1946–47. The location of the ledge is in proximity to Byrd Glacier, Mount Olympus, and other features that memorialize leaders and ships of Operation High Jump.

=== Mount Quackenbush ===
80°21′S 156°58′E. A flat-topped mountain, 2,435 metres (7,989 ft) high, which forms a projecting angle along the steep cliffs bordering the north side of Byrd Glacier, just west of Peckham Glacier. Named by the United States Advisory Committee on Antarctic Names (US-ACAN) for Captain Robert S. Quackenbush Jr., chief of staff to Admiral Cruzen (Central Group of Task Force 68) in United States Navy OpHjp, 1946–47, led by Admiral Byrd.

=== Mount Rummage ===
80°29′S 156°12′E. A conical, bare rock mountain, 1,510 metres (4,950 ft) high, at the west side of Ramseier Glacier. It is the westernmost mountain along the north wall of Byrd Glacier. Named by US-ACAN for Chief Laurence A. Rummage, QMCM, United States Navy, who took part in Christchurch transport and schedule operations for United States Navy OpDFrz, 1965.

=== Darnell Nunatak ===
80°27′S 155°54′E. A prominent nunatak, 1,405 metres (4,610 ft) high, standing 4 nautical miles (7.4 km; 4.6 mi) northwest of Mount Rummage. Named by US-ACAN for Chief Aviation Machinist's Mate Shepard L. Darnell, a member of United States Navy Squadron VX-6. During the period December 27, 1962 – January 4, 1963, Chief Darnell and six mechanics replaced in the field the engine of a helicopter downed on Emmanuel Glacier.

== Sources ==
- Alberts, Fred G., ed. (1995), Geographic Names of the Antarctic (PDF) (2 ed.), United States Board on Geographic Names This article incorporates public domain material from websites or documents of the United States Board on Geographic Names.
- "Hughes Basin", Geographic Names Information System, United States Geological Survey, United States Department of the Interior
- "Menster Ledge", Geographic Names Information System, United States Geological Survey, United States Department of the Interior
- Mount Olympus, USGS United States Geologic Survey, 1960

This article incorporates public domain material from websites or documents of the United States Geological Survey.
