= Lemanis =

Lemanis may refer to:

- Andrej Lemanis (born 1969), a Latvian Australian basketball player and coach
- Lemanis Valley, a mountain valley in Antarctica
- Portus Lemanis, a Roman Saxon shore fort in Kent, England
