= Kirchner Peak =

Mountain peak in Oates Land, Antarctica

Kirchner Peak (79°59′S 159°22′E) is a somewhat isolated peak, 1,170 metres (3,840 ft) high, located 2 nautical miles (4 km) north-northeast of Gaylord Ridge in the Nebraska Peaks, Antarctica. It was named by the Advisory Committee on Antarctic Names after J.F. Kirchner, a member of the United States Antarctic Research Program geophysical field party during the Ross Ice Shelf Project, 1974–75 and 1976–77 seasons.
