= Brandwein =

Brandwein is a surname. Notable people with the surname include:

- Avraham Brandwein (died 2013), Israeli Kabbalah scholar
- Naftule Brandwein (1884–1963), Jewish clarinetist and influential klezmer musician
- Oded Brandwein (born 1988), Israeli-Polish professional basketball player in the Israeli Premier League

== See also ==
- Brandwein Nunataks
