= Cornwell Corner =

Cornwell Corner (80°13′S 158°59′E) is an angular rock bluff, about 800 metres (2,600 ft) high, at the west end of Horney Bluff and the terminus of Merrick Glacier, where the glacial flow is forced east at an acute angle upon entering Byrd Glacier. It was named by the Advisory Committee on Antarctic Names, in association with Byrd Glacier, after Captain Delbert S. Cornwell, U.S. Navy, who was captain of the aircraft carrier USS Philippine Sea in U.S. Navy Operation Highjump, 1946–47, led by Admiral Byrd. The Philippine Sea carried six twin-engine Douglas R4D aircraft, which took off from the carrier deck and flew about 700 miles (1,100 km) to Little America base, Ross Ice Shelf, from where exploratory and photographic flights were made.
