= MacAyeal Peak =

Mountain peak in Oates Land, Antarctica

MacAyeal Peak (80°1′S 159°43′E) is a peak about 1,100 metres (3,600 ft) high located 2 nautical miles (4 km) west-northwest of the Brandwein Nunataks in the north-central part of the Nebraska Peaks of Antarctica. It was named by the Advisory Committee on Antarctic Names after Douglas R. MacAyeal of the Institute of Quaternary Studies, University of Maine, Orono, a member of the United States Antarctic Research Program glaciological party during the Ross Ice Shelf Project in the 1976–77 austral summer; he was later affiliated with the University of Chicago.
