= Horney Bluff =

Horney Bluff (80°9′S 159°40′E) is a conspicuous ice-free bluff about 15 nautical miles (30 km) long, extending eastward along the north side of Byrd Glacier from Merrick Glacier toward Cape Kerr, Antarctica. It was named by the Advisory Committee on Antarctic Names for Captain Harry R. Horney, Admiral Byrd's chief of staff on U.S. Navy Operation Highjump, 1946–47.

Cornwell Corner is located at the west end of Horney Bluff and the terminus of Merrick Glacier.
