= Turnstile Ridge =

Ridge in Antarctica

- Location within Antarctica

Highest point
- Coordinates: 79°50′S 154°36′E

Geography
- Continent: Antarctica
- Parent range: Britannia Range

Turnstile Ridge (79°50′S 154°36′E) is a ridge about 9 nautical miles (17 km; 10 mi) long, lying 3 nautical miles (5.6 km; 3.5 mi) north of Westhaven Nunatak at the northwest extremity of the Britannia Range.

== Name ==
Turnstile Ridge was so named by the Darwin Glacier Party (1957) of the Commonwealth Trans-Antarctic Expedition (CTAE) because snow passages resembling turnstiles occur throughout its length.

== Location ==
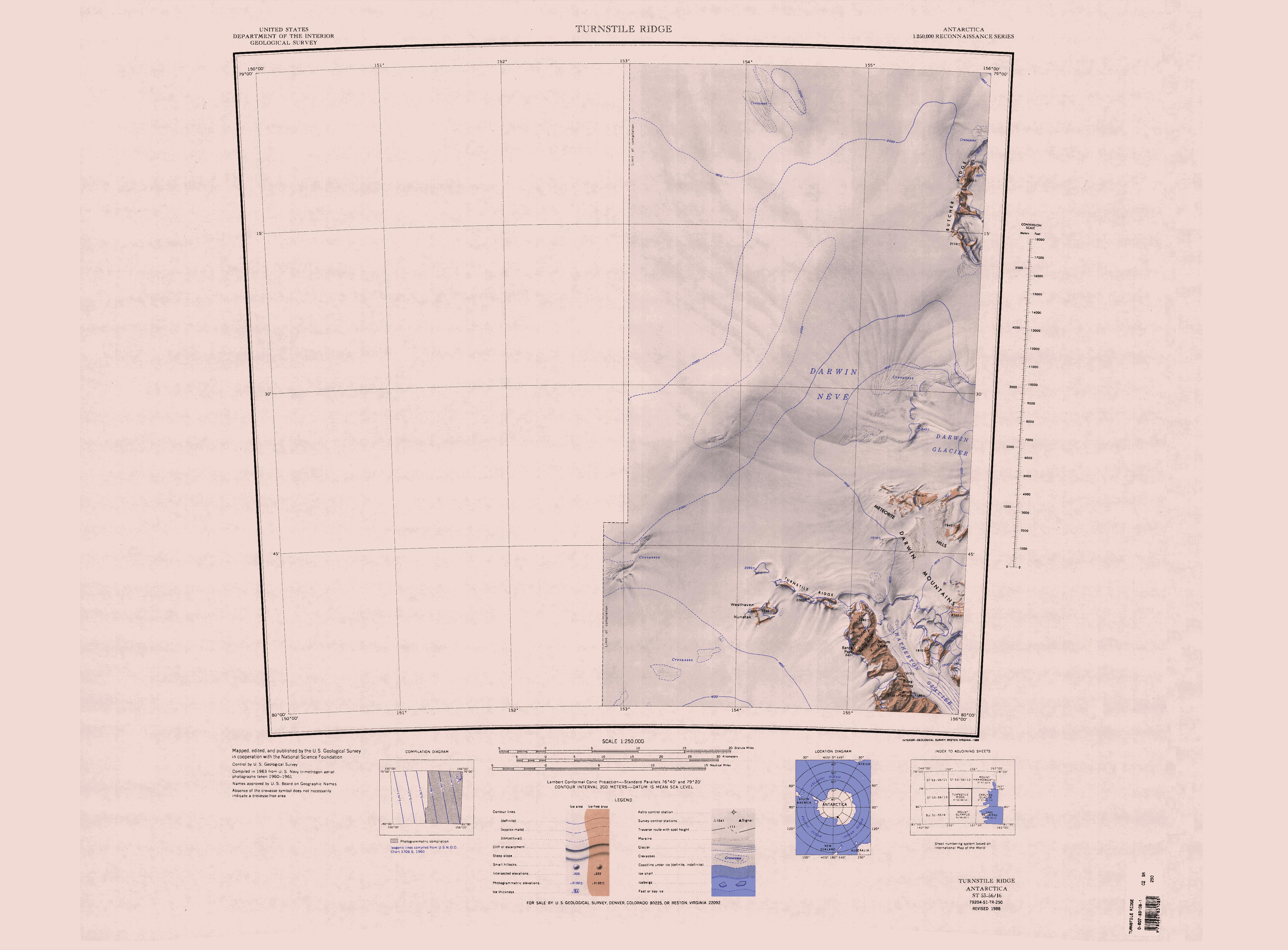
Turnstile Ridge in south center of mapped area

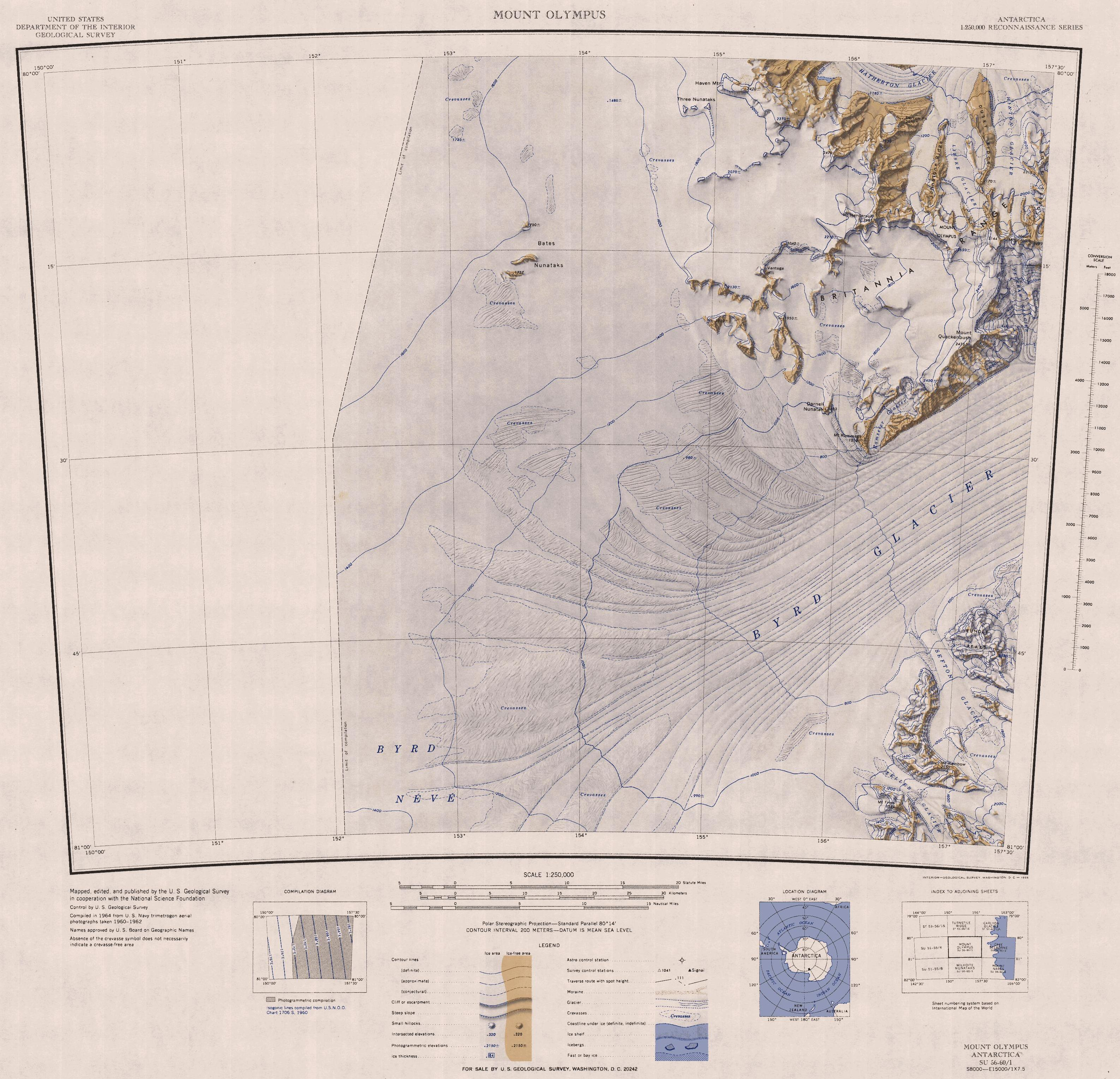
Nearby peaks in north center of mapped area

Turnstile Ridge is south of the Darwin Névé and southwest of the Meteorite Hills of the Darwin Mountains. It is west of the head of the Hatherton Glacier, which forms the boundary between the Darwin Mountains and the Britannia Range, The Westhaven Nunatak is southwest of Turnstile Ridge. Haven Mountain and the Three Nunataks lie further to the south. A largely ice-free line of ridges and valleys extends to the southeast of Turnstile Ridge along the south side of the Hatherton Glacier. This includes Abus Valley, Banna Peak, Banna Ridge, Bellum Valley, Bibra Valley and Danum Platform. Many of the nearby features were named in association with Britannia by a University of Waikato (New Zealand) geological party, 1978–79, led by M.J. Selby.

== Features ==
Features to the south and southeast include:

=== Westhaven Nunatak ===
79°51′S 154°14′E. A prominent nunatak, 2,240 metres (7,350 ft) high, standing 3 nautical miles (5.6 km; 3.5 mi) south of Turnstile Ridge in the northwest part of Britannia Range. It is the westernmost rock outcrop in this part of the range. The Darwin Glacier Party of the CTAE set up a survey station on its summit in December 1957. The name was suggested by Squadron-Leader J.R. Claydon, RNZAF, who first saw the feature from the air.

=== Haven Mountain ===
80°02′S 155°12′E. A prominent mountain, 2,470 metres (8,100 ft) high, with a level razor-back snow ridge at its highest (eastern) part, standing 2 nautical miles (3.7 km; 2.3 mi) northeast of Three Nunataks. So named by the Darwin Glacier Party of the CTAE (1956–58), who sheltered for five days in the largely snow-free area below the north side of the summit ridge.

=== Three Nunataks ===
80°04′S 154°50′E. Three nunataks, largely ice-covered, lying 2 nautical miles (3.7 km; 2.3 mi) southwest of Haven Mountain at the northwest edge of the Britannia Range. Named by the Darwin Glacier Party of the CTAE, 1956–58.

=== Abus Valley ===
79°53′S 155°05′E. An ice-free valley 3 nautical miles (5.6 km; 3.5 mi) southeast of Turnstile Ridge. Abus is a historical place name formerly used in Roman Britain.

=== Banna Peak ===
79°55′S 155°03′E. A peak 2,420 metres (7,940 ft) high that surmounts the south end of Banna Ridge. Banna is a historical placename formerly used in Roman Britain.

=== Banna Ridge ===
79°54′S 155°06′E. A rock ridge that rises over 2,000 metres (6,600 ft) high and extends from Banna Peak northeast toward the head of Hatherton Glacier. The ridge forms the southeast wall of Abus Valley. Named in association with Banna Peak by a University of Waikato geological party, 1978–79.

=== Bellum Valley ===
79°54′S 155°15′E. A small valley east of Banna Ridge. The valley entrance is adjacent to the head of Hatherton Glacier. Bellum is a historical placename formerly used in Roman Britain.

=== Bibra Valley ===
79°57′S 155°30′E. Ice-free valley bounded eastward by Danum Platform, lying 6 nautical miles (11 km; 6.9 mi) northeast of Haven Mountain. Bibra is a historical place name formerly used in Roman Britain.

=== Danum Platform ===
79°59′S 155°27′E. A mesa-like rock eminence 4 nautical miles (7.4 km; 4.6 mi) northeast of Haven Mountain, forming the divide between Bibra Valley and Dubris Valley. Danum is a historical name used in Roman Britain for present-day Doncaster.

=== Dubris Valley ===
80°00′S 155°28′E. A narrow ice-free valley just east of Danum Platform. Dubris is a historical name used in Roman Britain for a stream at Dover.

=== Isca Valley ===
80°01′S 155°32′E. Narrow ice-free valley lying next west of Ituna Valley and 2 nautical miles (3.7 km; 2.3 mi) east-northeast of Haven Mountain. Isca is a historical name used in Roman Britain for the River Exe.

=== Ituna Valley ===
80°00′S 155°45′E. Narrow ice-free valley between Isca Valley and Lemanis Valley. The valley opens northward to Hatherton Glacier, 8 nautical miles (15 km; 9.2 mi) west-northwest of Derrick Peak. Ituna is a historical name used in Roman Britain for the River Eden.

=== Venta Plateau ===
80°03′S 155°40′E. A small plateau rising to 1,800–2,000 metres (5,900–6,600 ft) high between the heads of Isca Valley and Lemanis Valley, located 4 nautical miles (7.4 km; 4.6 mi) east of Haven Mountain. Venta is a historical name used in Roman Britain for present-day Winchester.

=== Lemanis Valley ===
80°01′S 155°50′E. A partly ice-free valley intruded at the entrance by a lobe of ice from Hatherton Glacier, lying between Ituna Valley and Lindum Valley and 7 nautical miles (13 km; 8.1 mi) west-northwest of Derrick Peak. Lemanis is an old Roman place name for Lymn in England.

== Sources ==
- Alberts, Fred G., ed. (1995), Geographic Names of the Antarctic (PDF) (2 ed.), United States Board on Geographic Names This article incorporates public domain material from websites or documents of the United States Board on Geographic Names.
- Mount Olympus, USGS United States Geologic Survey, 1960
- Turnstyle Ridge, USGS United States Geologic Survey, 1963

This article incorporates public domain material from websites or documents of the United States Geological Survey.
