= Nicholson Peninsula =

Peninsula of Antarctica

- Peninsula
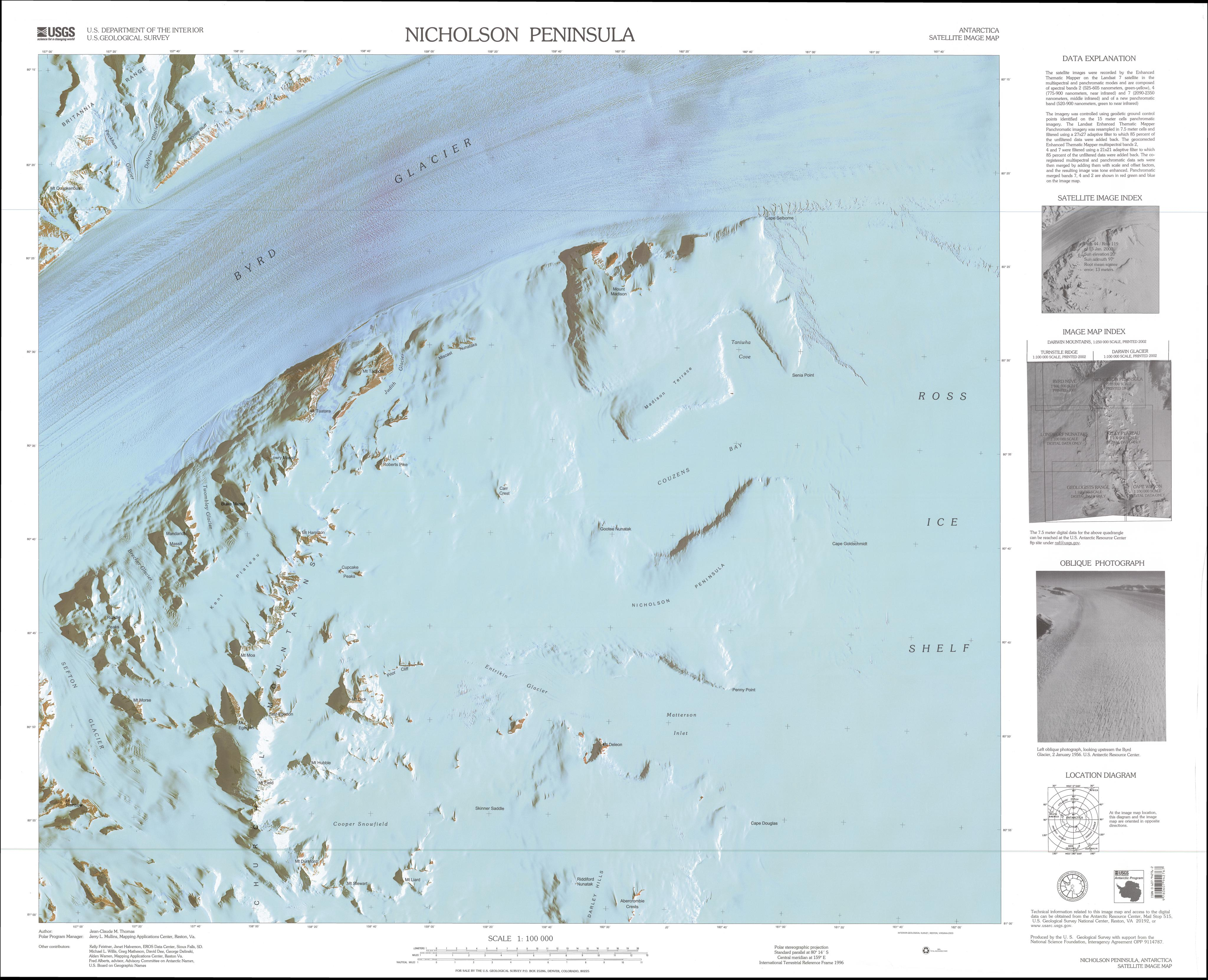
- Satellite Image Map of Nicholson Peninsula and surroundings. Byrd Glacier to the northeast. Nicholson Peninsula center east.

- Location within Antarctica
- Coordinates: 80°43′S 160°30′E
- Location: Antarctica
- Range: Churchill Mountains
- Water bodies: Ross Ice Shelf

Nicholson Peninsula (80°43′S 160°30′E) is a broad ice-covered peninsula about 15 nautical miles (28 km) long, between Couzens Bay and Matterson Inlet on the Shackleton Coast on the west side of the Ross Ice Shelf, Antarctica.

== Location ==
Nicholson Peninsula faces the Ross Ice Shelf to the east. To the north, across Couzens Bay, the peninsula tipped by Cape Selbourne is at the mouth of Byrd Glacier, which flows from the west into the Ross Ice Shelf. To the west is the northern part of the Churchill Mountains. To the south, across Matterson Inlet, are the Darley Hills.

The peninsula was named by Advisory Committee on Antarctic Names (US-ACAN) for Captain M.W. Nicholson, United States Navy, chief of staff to the United States Antarctic Program Officer during Operation Deep Freeze (OpDFrz) 1964.

== Features on the peninsula ==
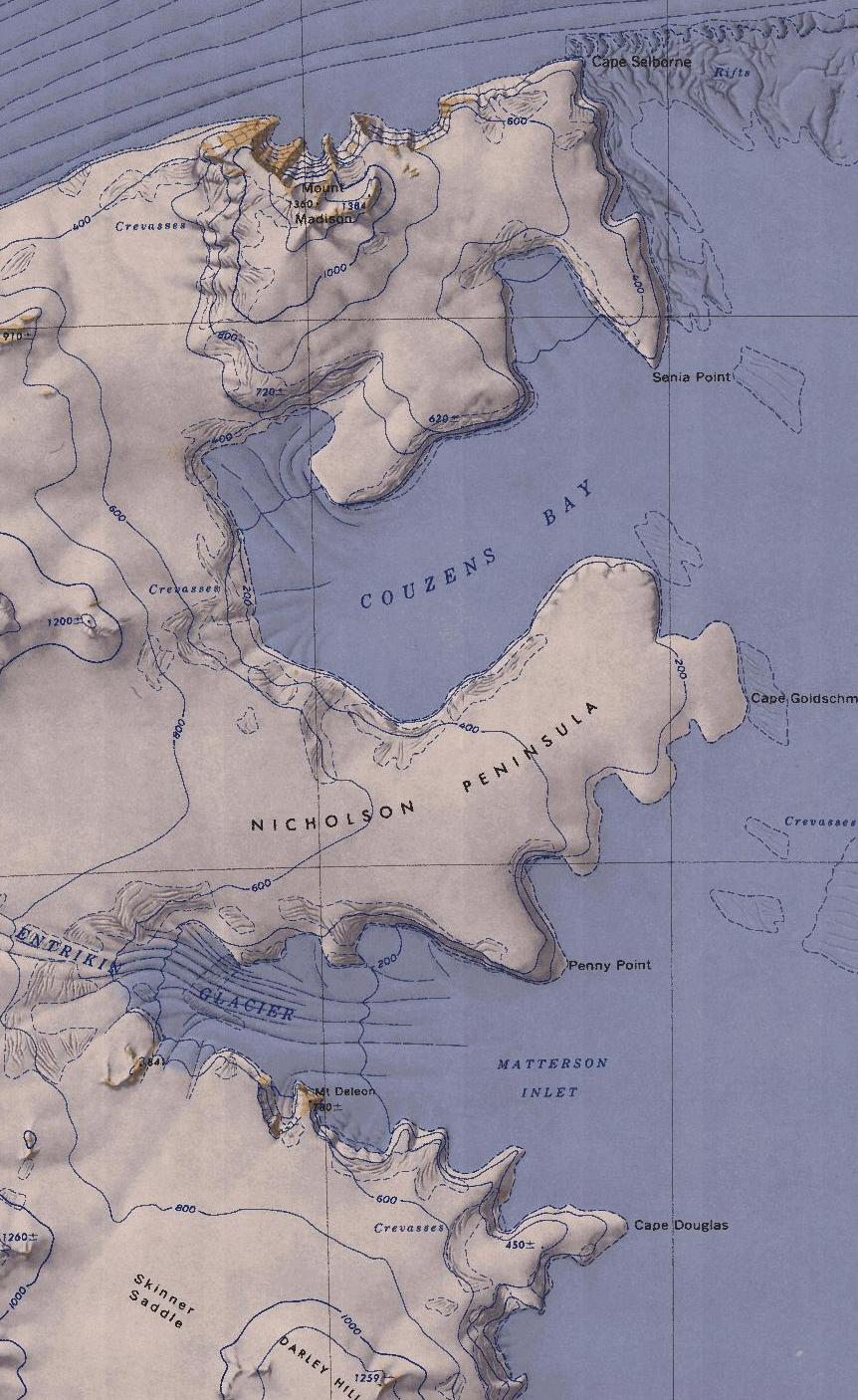
Nicholson Peninsula and surroundings

=== Gootee Nunatak ===
80°39′S 159°57′E. A small but distinctive nunatak, about 250 metres (820 ft) high, which is the only rock outcrop at the west end of Couzens Bay. The nunatak was geologically mapped by a United States Antarctic Program field party led by Edmund Stump, 2000–01, and named after geologist Brian Gootee, a member of the party.

=== Cape Goldschmidt ===
80°41′S 161°12′E. A low ice-covered cape forming the eastern tip of Nicholson Peninsula, at the west side of the Ross Ice Shelf. Named by the New Zealand Geological Survey Antarctic Expedition (NZGSAE) (1960–61) for Donald R. Goldschmidt, a member of the NZGSAE parties of 1959–60 and 1960–61 which mapped this area.

=== Penny Point ===
80°48′S 160°41′E. An ice-covered point on the south side of Nicholson Peninsula, marking the north side of the entrance to Matterson Inlet along the Ross Ice Shelf. Named by the Advisory Committee on Antarctic Names (US-ACAN) for Lieutenant Commander H.C. Penny, USN, commanding officer of USS Vance, ocean station ship in support of aircraft flights between New Zealand and Antarctica in Operation Deep Freeze 1962.

== Features to the north ==
=== Couzens Bay ===
80°35′S 160°30′E. An ice-filled bay about 10 miles (16 km) long, entered between Senia Point and Cape Goldschmidt on the west side of the Ross Ice Shelf. Named by the NZGSAE (1960-61) for Lieutenant Thomas Couzens, Royal New Zealand Air Force, who lost his life in a crevasse accident near Cape Selborne on 19 November 1959.

=== Madison Terrace ===
80.5333333°S 160.3°E. A rectangular terrace, 6 miles (9.7 km) long and 3 miles (4.8 km) wide, abutting the south part of Mount Madison on Shackleton Coast. Ice draining from Mount Madison covers the terrace, which terminates in a line of icefalls within Couzens Bay. Named by the US-ACAN in association with Mount Madison.

=== Taniwha Cove ===
80.5°S 160.6666667°E. A U-shaped cove within Couzens Bay. Its entrance is bounded at the east by Senia Point and Mount Tadpole rises above its western shores. Taniwha is the Maori word for a creature/monster of the deep, often used mythologically.

=== Senia Point ===
80°31′S 160°58′E. An ice-covered point 9 miles (14 km) south of Cape Selborne, marking the north side of the entrance to Couzens Bay. Named by US-ACAN for B. Senia, master of the cargo vessels USNS Mizar during Operation Deep Freeze 1962 and USNS Mirfak during Operation Deep Freeze 1963.

=== Cape Selborne ===
80°23′S 160°45′E. A high snow-covered cape at the south side of Barne Inlet, the terminus of Byrd Glacier. Discovered by the British Nimrod Antarctic Expedition (BrNAE) of 1901–04. Named for William Palmer, 2nd Earl of Selborne, who entered the Cabinet as First Lord of the Admiralty in 1900.

=== Mount Madison ===
80°26′S 160°10′E. A prominent, largely ice-covered mountain, 1,385 metres (4,544 ft) high, rising 7 miles (11 km) west of Cape Selborne, on the south side of Byrd Glacier. Named by US-ACAN for Lieutenant Commander Douglas W. Madison, aide to the Commander, United States Naval Support Force Antarctica, 1961–62, and Public Information Officer, 1963–64.

=== Contortion Spur ===
80°25′S 160°9′E. The largest and easternmost of three spurs which descend northwards from Mount Madison near the mouth of Byrd Glacier. The spur exposes a spectacular syncline of white marble and black schist. It was geologically mapped on December 10, 2000, by Edmund Stump of the United States Antarctic Program. He suggested the name because of the skewed form of the spur.

== Features to the south ==
=== Entrikin Glacier ===
80°49′S 160°00′E. A broad sweeping glacier flowing eastward from the Churchill Mountains into Matterson Inlet. Named by US-ACAN for Lieutenant Commander Joseph W. Entrikin, United States Navy, pilot with Squadron VX-6 during Operation Deep Freeze I, 1955–56.

=== Mount Deleon ===
80°51′S 159°57′E. A mainly ice-free mountain, 780 metres (2,560 ft) high, located along the south side of Entrikin Glacier, 9 miles (14 km) west-north-west of Cape Douglas. Named by US-ACAN for Emilio A. Deleon, hauling equipment operator, United States Navy, a member of the Byrd Station party in 1963.

=== Matterson Inlet ===
80°50′S 160°30′E. An ice-filled inlet between Penny Point and Cape Douglas, on the west side of Ross Ice Shelf. Named by the NZGSAE (1960-61) for Garth John Matterson, leader of the party that surveyed the area.

=== Cape Douglas ===
80°55′S 160°52′E. An ice-covered cape marking the south side of the entrance to Matterson Inlet, on the west side of Ross Ice Shelf. Discovered by the BrNAE of 1901–04 and named for Admiral Sir Archibald Lucius Douglas, Lord of the Admiralty, who persuaded the Admiralty to assign naval seamen to the expedition.

== Sources ==
- Alberts, Fred G., ed. (1995), Geographic Names of the Antarctic (PDF) (2 ed.), United States Board on Geographic Names This article incorporates public domain material from websites or documents of the United States Board on Geographic Names.
- Cape Selborne, USGS, 1963
- "Contortion Spur", Geographic Names Information System, United States Geological Survey, United States Department of the Interior
- "Gootee Nunatak", Geographic Names Information System, United States Geological Survey, United States Department of the Interior
- "Madison Terrace", Geographic Names Information System, United States Geological Survey, United States Department of the Interior
- "Taniwha Cove", Geographic Names Information System, United States Geological Survey, United States Department of the Interior
- This article incorporates public domain material from websites or documents of the United States Geological Survey.
