= Robertson Buttress =

Robertson Buttress (79°51′S 158°17′E) is the westernmost (1040 m) in a series of large rock buttresses on the south side of Darwin Glacier between Alley Glacier and Gaussiran Glacier. It was named by the Advisory Committee on Antarctic Names (US-ACAN) after William Gray Robertson, Jr. of ASA, a specialist in the design and installation of communication systems for United States Antarctic Program (USAP) in the McMurdo Sound and McMurdo Dry Valleys areas from 1990 to 2000.
