= Eilers Peak =

Mountain peak in Oates Land, Antarctica

Eilers Peak (80°4′S 159°28′E) is a prominent peak, about 1,500 metres (5,000 ft) high, located 2.5 nautical miles (5 km) north-northwest of Rand Peak in the central Nebraska Peaks. It was named by the Advisory Committee on Antarctic Names after D.H. Eilers of the Ross Ice Shelf Management Office, University of Nebraska–Lincoln, and a member of the United States Antarctic Research Program glaciological party during the Ross Ice Shelf Project, 1974–75 field season.
