= Britannia Range (Antarctica) =

Mountain range in Antarctica

- Location within Antarctica

Geography
- Continent: Antarctica
- Range coordinates: 80°05′S 158°00′E

The Britannia Range (80°05′S 158°00′E) is a range of mountains bounded by the Hatherton Glacier and Darwin Glacier on the north and the Byrd Glacier on the south, westward of the Ross Ice Shelf in Antarctica.

== Exploration and naming ==
The Britannia Range was discovered by the British National Antarctic Expedition (1901–04) under Robert Falcon Scott. It was named after HMS Britannia, a vessel utilized as the Britannia Royal Naval College in England, which had been attended by several officers of Scott's expedition.

== Location ==
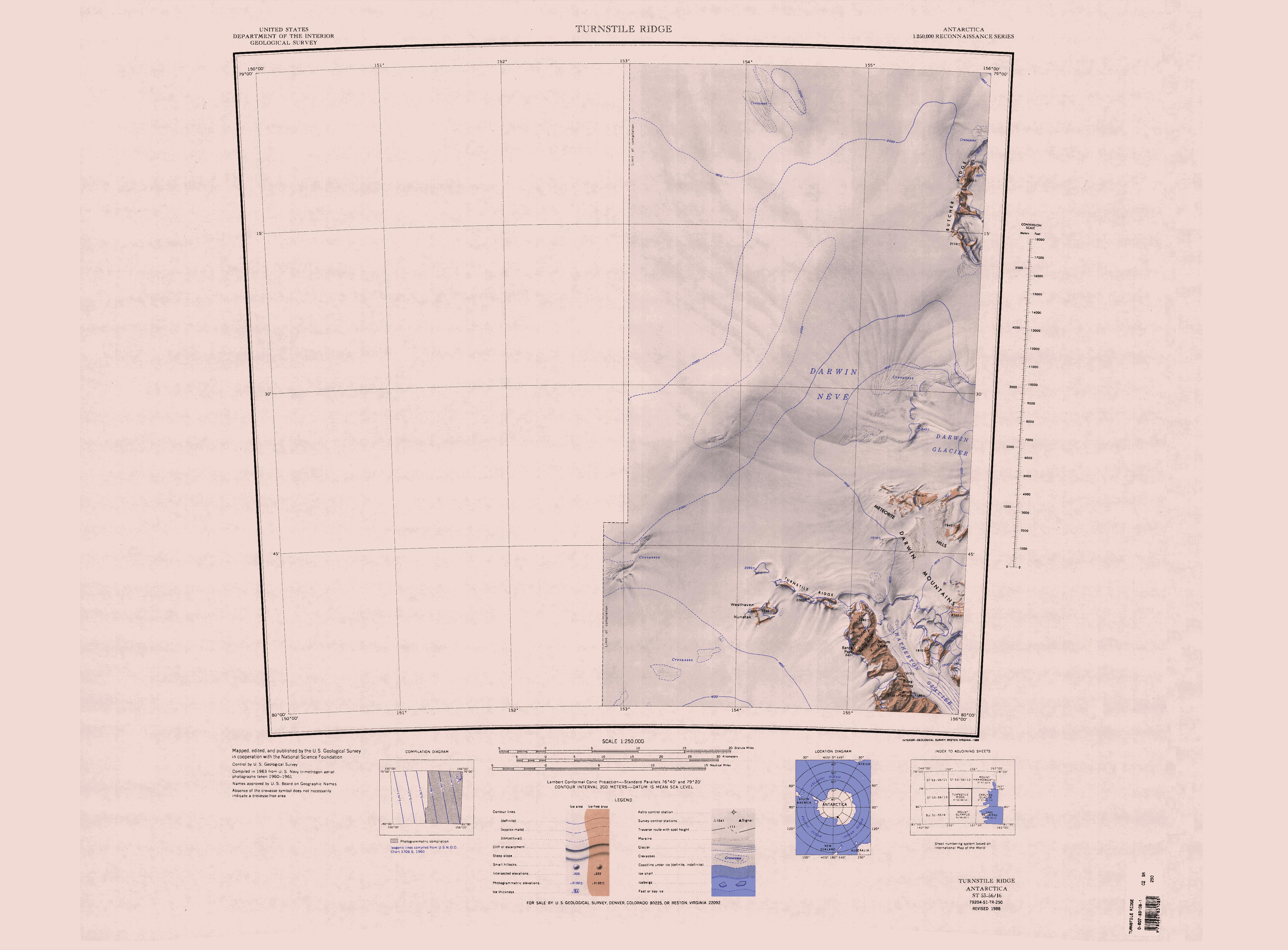
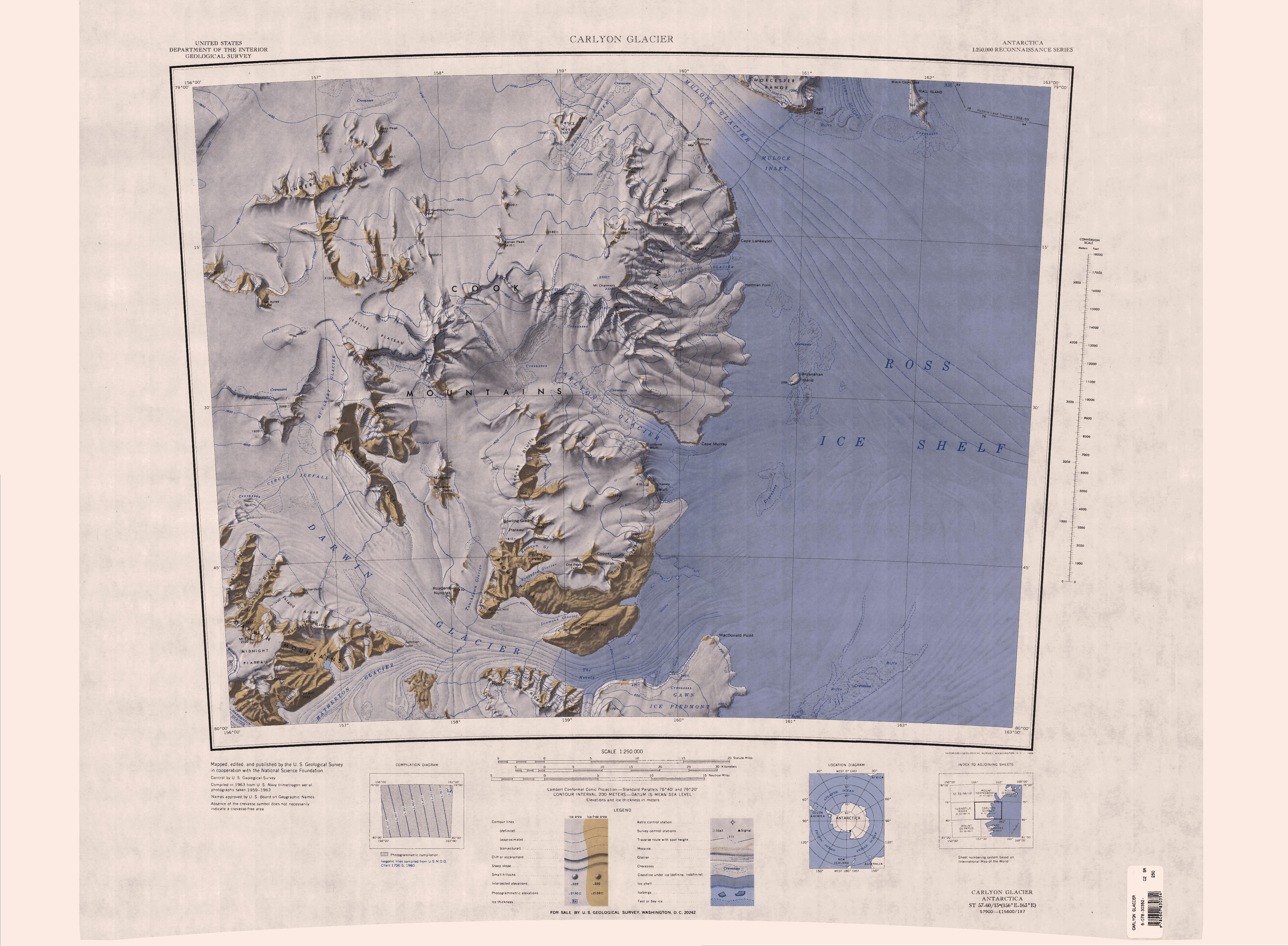
Northern part of range, extreme south of maps
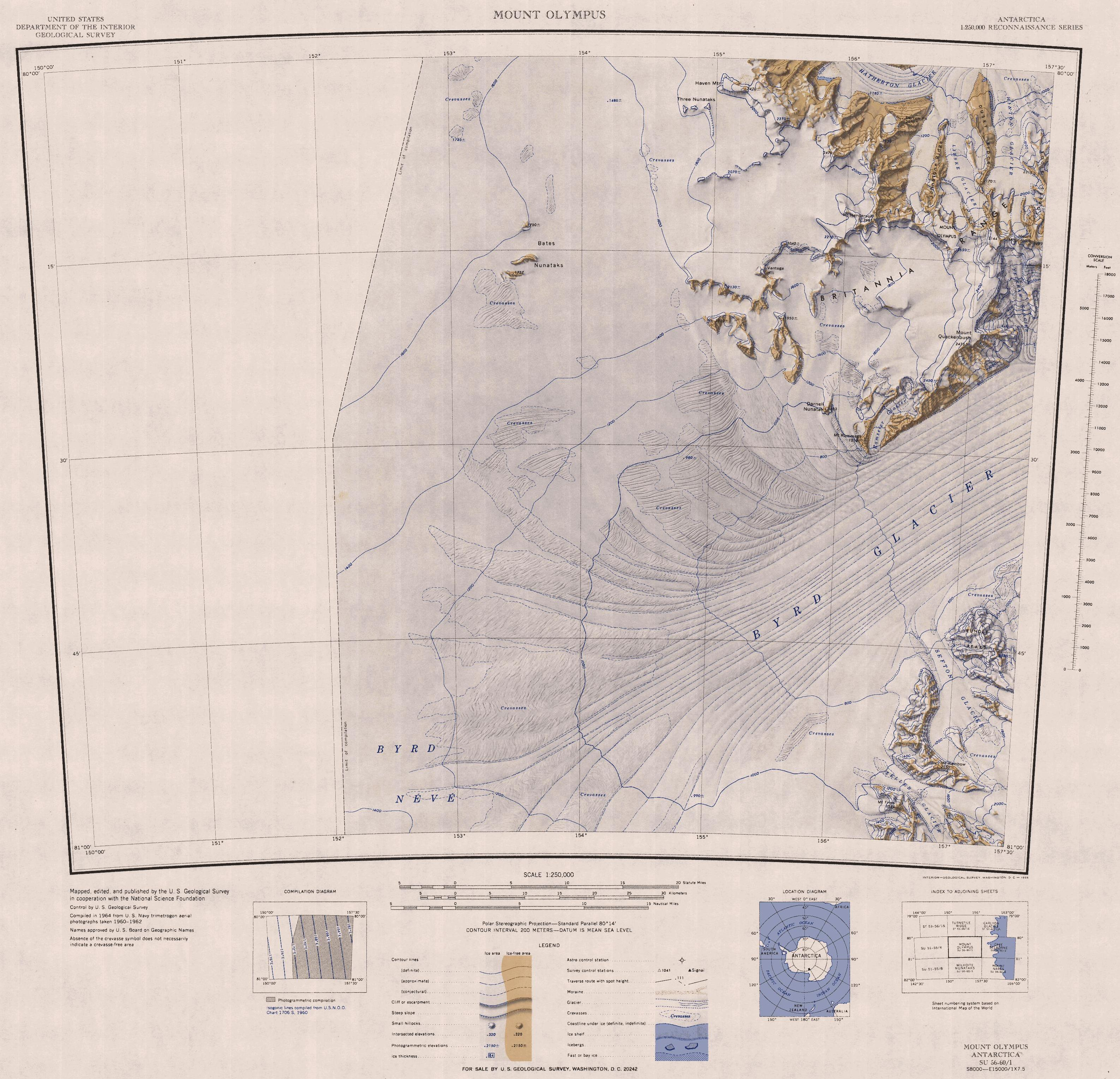
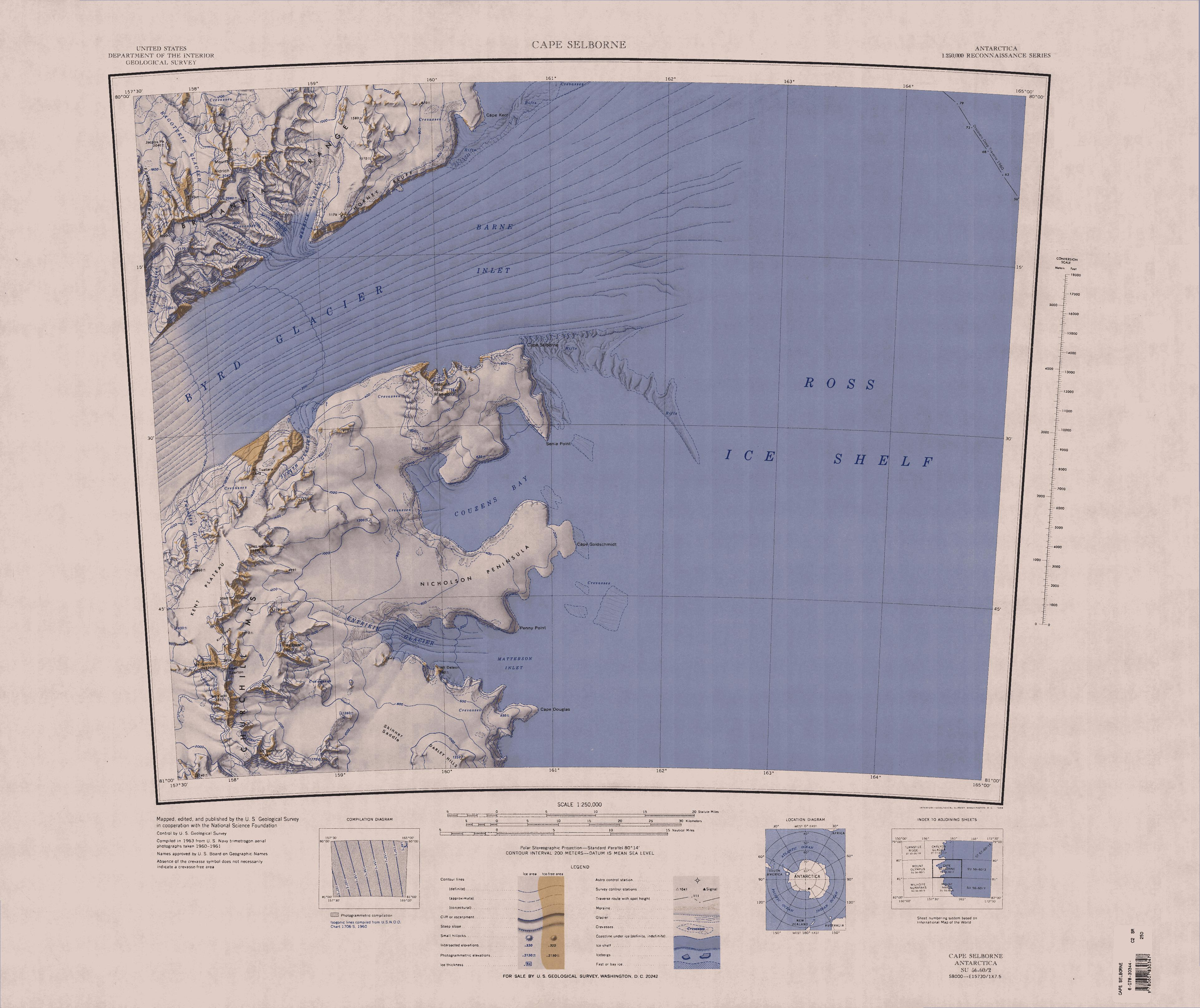
Main part of range north of Byrd Glacier

The Britannia Range is east of the Antarctic Plateau. It is south of the Darwin Mountains and the Cook Mountains, which are north of the Hatherton Glacier and the Darwin Glacier. At the mouth of the Darwin Glacier the range adjoins the Gawn Ice Piedmont, which extends into the Ross Ice Shelf to the east. The Byrd Glacier flows northeast past the south side of the Gawn Ice Piedmont. It divides the Britannia Range from the Churchill Mountains to the south.

== Major glaciers ==
- Hatherton Glacier (79°55′S 157°35′E), a large glacier flowing from the polar plateau generally eastward along the south side of the Darwin Mountains and entering Darwin Glacier at Junction Spur.
- Darwin Glacier (79°53′S 159°00′E), a large glacier in Antarctica. It flows from the polar plateau eastward between the Darwin Mountains and the Cook Mountains to the Ross Ice Shelf. The Darwin and its major tributary the Hatherton are often treated as one system, the Darwin–Hatherton.
- Byrd Glacier (80°20′S 159°00′E), a major glacier in Antarctica, about 136 km (85 mi) long and 24 km (15 mi) wide. It drains an extensive area of the Antarctic plateau, and flows eastward to discharge into the Ross Ice Shelf.

== Features ==
- Turnstile Ridge (79°50′S 154°36′E), a ridge about 9 nautical miles (17 km; 10 mi) long, lying 3 nautical miles (5.6 km; 3.5 mi) north of Westhaven Nunatak at the northwest extremity of the Britannia Range.
- Derrick Peak (80°4′S 156°23′E), a prominent ice-free peak, 2,070 metres (6,790 ft) high, overlooking the south side of Hatherton Glacier, 3 nautical miles (5.6 km; 3.5 mi) west of the north end of Johnstone Ridge.
- Mount Henderson (80°12′S 156°13′E), a prominent mountain, 2,660 metres (8,730 ft) high, standing 5 nautical miles (9.3 km; 5.8 mi) west of Mount Olympus.
- Ravens Mountains (80°20′S 155°25′E), a symmetrical group of mountains on the west side of Hughes Basin. The mountains are 12 nautical miles (22 km; 14 mi) long and rise to 2,130 metres (6,990 ft) in Doll Peak.
- Hughes Basin (80.3166667°S 156.3°E), a large basinlike névé which is bounded except to the south by Ravens Mountains, Mount Henderson, Mount Olympus and Mount Quackenbush. The feature is 15 nautical miles (28 km; 17 mi) long and the ice surface descends north–south from 2,000 metres (6,600 ft) near Mount Olympus to 1,000 metres (3,300 ft) near Darnell Nunatak, where there is discharge to Byrd Glacier.
- Mount McClintock (80°13′S 157°26′E), the highest mountain (3,490 m (11,450 ft)) in the Britannia Range, surmounting the south end of Forbes Ridge, 6 nautical miles (11 km; 6.9 mi) east of Mount Olympus.
- Mount Aldrich (80°7′S 158°13′E), a massive, somewhat flat-topped mountain standing at the east side of Ragotzkie Glacier.

== Sources ==
- Alberts, Fred G., ed. (1995), Geographic Names of the Antarctic (PDF) (2 ed.), United States Board on Geographic Names This article incorporates public domain material from websites or documents of the United States Board on Geographic Names.
- Cape Selborne, USGS United States Geologic Survey, 1960
- Carlyon Glacier, USGS United States Geologic Survey, 1960
- "Hughes Basin", Geographic Names Information System, United States Geological Survey, United States Department of the Interior
- Mount Olympus, USGS United States Geologic Survey, 1960
- "Ravens Mountains", Geographic Names Information System, United States Geological Survey, United States Department of the Interior
- Turnstyle Ridge, USGS United States Geologic Survey, 1963

This article incorporates public domain material from websites or documents of the United States Geological Survey.
