= Derrick Peak =

Prominent ice-free peak in Antarctica

- Location within Antarctica

Highest point
- Coordinates: 80°4′S 156°23′E

Geography
- Continent: Antarctica
- Parent range: Britannia Range

Derrick Peak (80°4′S 156°23′E) is a prominent ice-free peak, 2,070 metres (6,790 ft) high, overlooking the south side of Hatherton Glacier, 3 nautical miles (5.6 km; 3.5 mi) west of the north end of Johnstone Ridge.

== Name ==
Derrick Peak was named by the Advisory Committee on Antarctic Names for Robert O. Derrick of the United States Weather Bureau, who served as assistant to the United States Antarctic Research Program Representative at Christchurch from 1960 until his death in 1966.

== Location ==
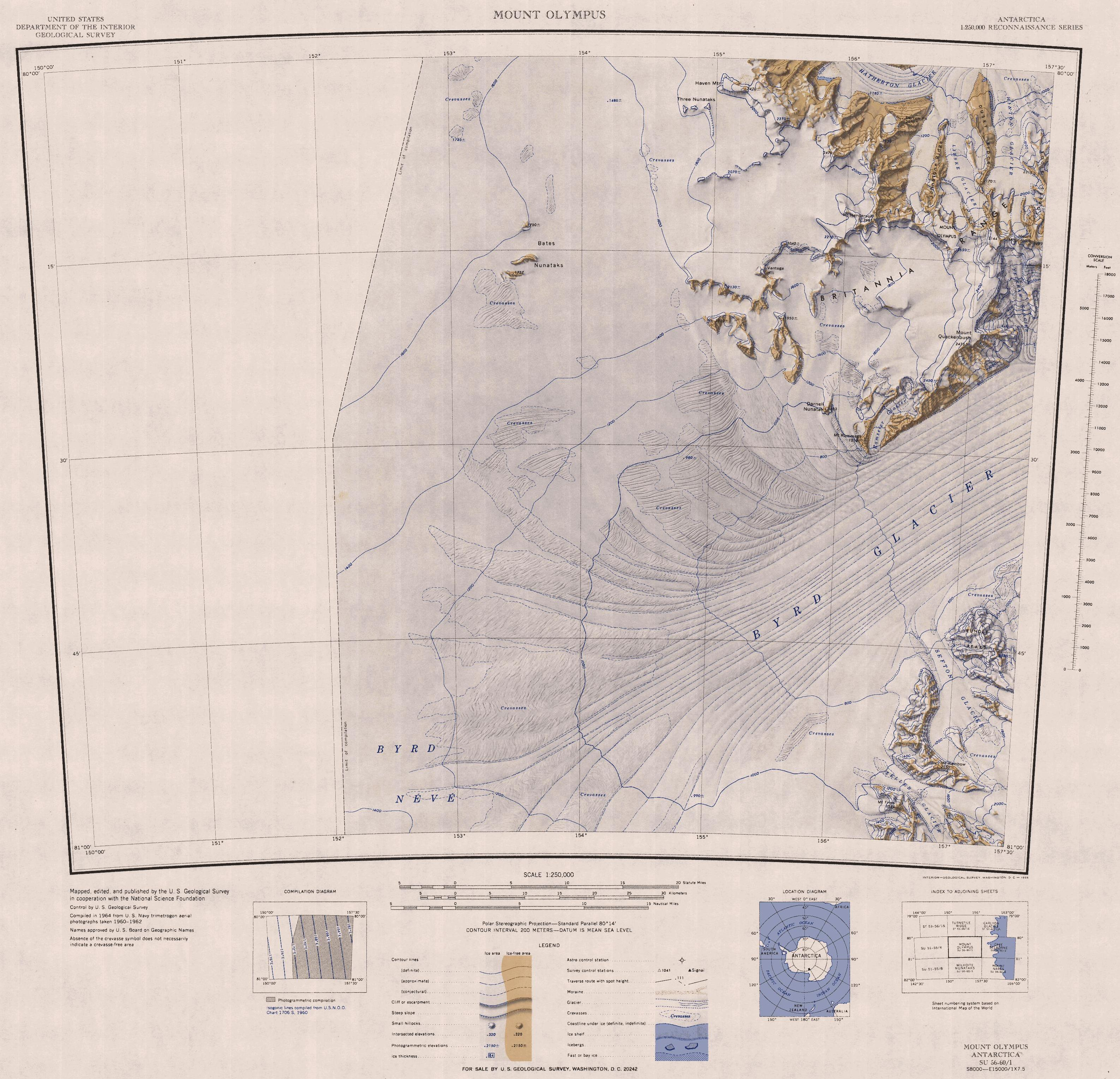
Derrick Peak in north center

Derrick Peak is in the north of the Britannia Range, overlooking the Hatherton Glacier to the north, which forms the boundary with the Darwin Mountains. It is east of a line of relatively ice-free valleys and ridges along the south side of Hatherton Glacier, north of Mount Henderson and west of Johnstone Ridge and Dusky Ridge. Most of the nearby features were named in association with Britannia by a University of Waikato (New Zealand) geological party, 1978-79, led by M.J. Selby.

== Western features ==
Nearby features to the west include:

=== Lindum Valley ===
80°03′S 155°58′E. Ice-filled valley that opens northward to Hatherton Glacier, lying 5 nautical miles (9.3 km; 5.8 mi) west-northwest of Derrick Peak. Lindum is an old Roman place name for present-day Lincoln.

=== Magnis Valley ===
80°05′S 156°05′E. Broad ice-free valley, 5 nautical miles (9.3 km; 5.8 mi) long, lying 3 nautical miles (5.6 km; 3.5 mi) west of Derrick Peak. Magnis is a historical place name formerly used in Roman Britain.

=== Magnis Ridge ===
80°05′S 156°12′E. A rock ridge 1.5 nautical miles (2.8 km; 1.7 mi) west of Derrick Peak, forming the divide between Magnis Valley and Metaris Valley. Named in association with Magnis Valley.

=== DeGalan Peak ===
80.1166667°S 155.9166667°E. A peak that rises to 2,470 metres (8,100 ft) at the head of Magnis Valley. Named after Lee DeGalan, contractor employee in charge of U.S. Antarctic Project (USAP) cargo shipments out of Port Hueneme, CA, for more than 20 years.

=== Metaris Valley ===
80°05′S 156°17′E. A small, rounded cirque valley with steep sides and residual névé, lying west of Derrick Peak. Named in association with Britannia by a University of Waikato (N.Z.) geological party, 1978-79, led by M.J. Selby. Metaris is the historical name of a bay in Roman Britain, known today as The Wash.

== Southern features ==
Nearby features to the south include:

=== Onnum Valley ===
80.1°S 156.35°E An ice-free valley between Derrick Peak and Onnum Ridge. Named in association with Onnum Ridge.

=== Operose Peak ===
80.1°S 156.2333333°E A peak above Onnum Valley to the southwest of Derrick Peak. The steep lower slopes of the peak are of Beacon sandstone; the top, 2,130 metres (6,990 ft) high, is made up of a thick dolerite sill. The Latin name means laborious or requiring great pain reflecting the steepness of the slopes.

=== Onnum Ridge ===
80°07′S 156°25′E. A mountain spur that descends northeast to McCraw Glacier, 3 nautical miles (5.6 km; 3.5 mi) south of Derrick Peak. Onnum is a historical placename formerly used in Roman Britain.

=== Pontes Ridge ===
80°08′S 156°24′E. A mountain spur that descends eastward to McCraw Glacier, 4 nautical miles (7.4 km; 4.6 mi) south of Derrick Peak. Pontes is a historical place name formerly used in Roman Britain.

=== Sabrina Valley ===
80°09′S 156°22′E. An ice-free valley between Pontes Ridge and Sabrina Ridge. Named in association with Sabrina Ridge.

=== Sabrina Ridge ===
80°09′S 156°20′E. A bare rock ridge between Sabrina Valley and Tamarus Valley, 5 nautical miles (9.3 km; 5.8 mi) south of Derrick Peak. Sabrina is a historical name formerly used in Roman Britain for the River Severn.

== Sources ==
- Alberts, Fred G., ed. (1995), Geographic Names of the Antarctic (PDF) (2 ed.), United States Board on Geographic Names This article incorporates public domain material from websites or documents of the United States Board on Geographic Names.
- "DeGalan Peak", Geographic Names Information System, United States Geological Survey, United States Department of the Interior
- Mount Olympus, USGS United States Geologic Survey, 1960
- "Onnum Valley", Geographic Names Information System, United States Geological Survey, United States Department of the Interior
- "Operose Peak", Geographic Names Information System, United States Geological Survey, United States Department of the Interior

This article incorporates public domain material from websites or documents of the United States Geological Survey.
