= Barne Inlet =

Reentrant (an inlet formed by two spurs of land) on the coast of Antarctica

Barne Inlet (80°15′S 160°15′E) is a reentrant (an inlet formed by two spurs of land) on the west side of the Ross Ice Shelf, on the coast of Antarctica. It lies between Cape Kerr and Cape Selborne. It is about 17 nautical miles (30 km) wide, and is occupied by the lower part of Byrd Glacier.

It was discovered by the British National Antarctic Expedition (1901–1904) and named for Lieutenant Michael Barne, Royal Navy, a member of the expedition, who with Sub-Lieutenant George Mulock mapped the coastline this far south in 1903.
