= Brandwein Nunataks =

Brandwein Nunataks (80°2′S 159°55′E) are a pair of nunataks, 870 metres (2,850 ft) high, which lie close together and mark the northeast extent of the Nebraska Peaks. They were named by the Advisory Committee on Antarctic Names after S. (Sid) Brandwein, a member of the United States Antarctic Research Program geophysical field party, Ross Ice Shelf Project, 1973–74 field season.

== See also ==
- MacAyeal Peak
