= Byrd Glacier =

Glacier in Antarctica

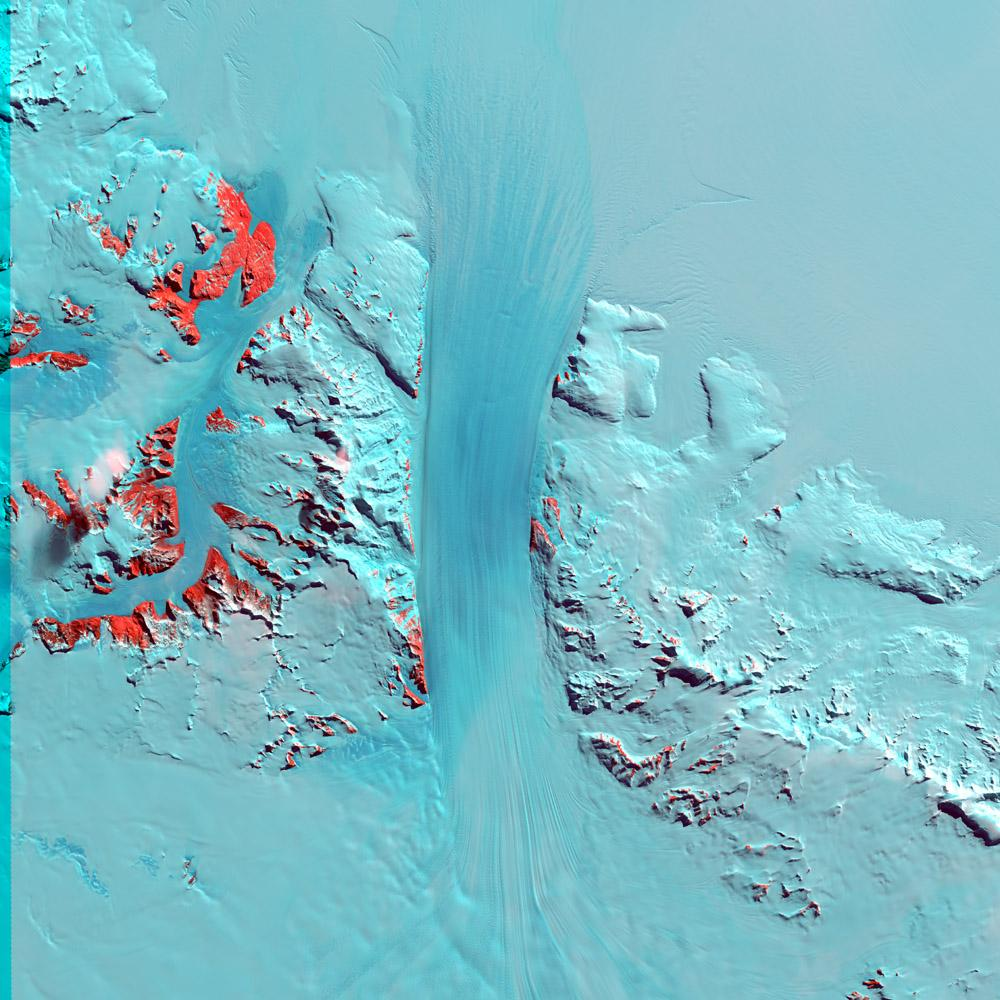
- Byrd Glacier from Landsat

- Location within Antarctica
- Location: Ross Dependency
- Coordinates: 80°20′S 159°00′E
- Length: 136 km (85 mi)
- Width: 24 km (15 mi)
- Thickness: unknown
- Terminus: Ross Ice Shelf
- Status: unknown

The Byrd Glacier (80°20′S 159°00′E) is a major glacier in Antarctica, about 161 km (100 mi) long and 24 km (15 mi) wide. It drains an extensive area of the Antarctic plateau, and flows eastward to discharge into the Ross Ice Shelf.

== Location ==
The Byrd Glacier flows eastward between the Britannia Range to the north and the Churchill Mountains to the south. It discharges into the Ross Ice Shelf at Barne Inlet. Its mouth lies between Cape Kerr to the north and Cape Selborne to the south. The valley below the glacier used to be recognised as one of the lowest points not to be covered by liquid water on Earth, reaching 2,780 metres (9,120 feet) below sea level.

The glacier was named by the NZ-APC after Rear Admiral Richard E. Byrd, United States Navy, American Antarctic explorer.

== Mouth ==
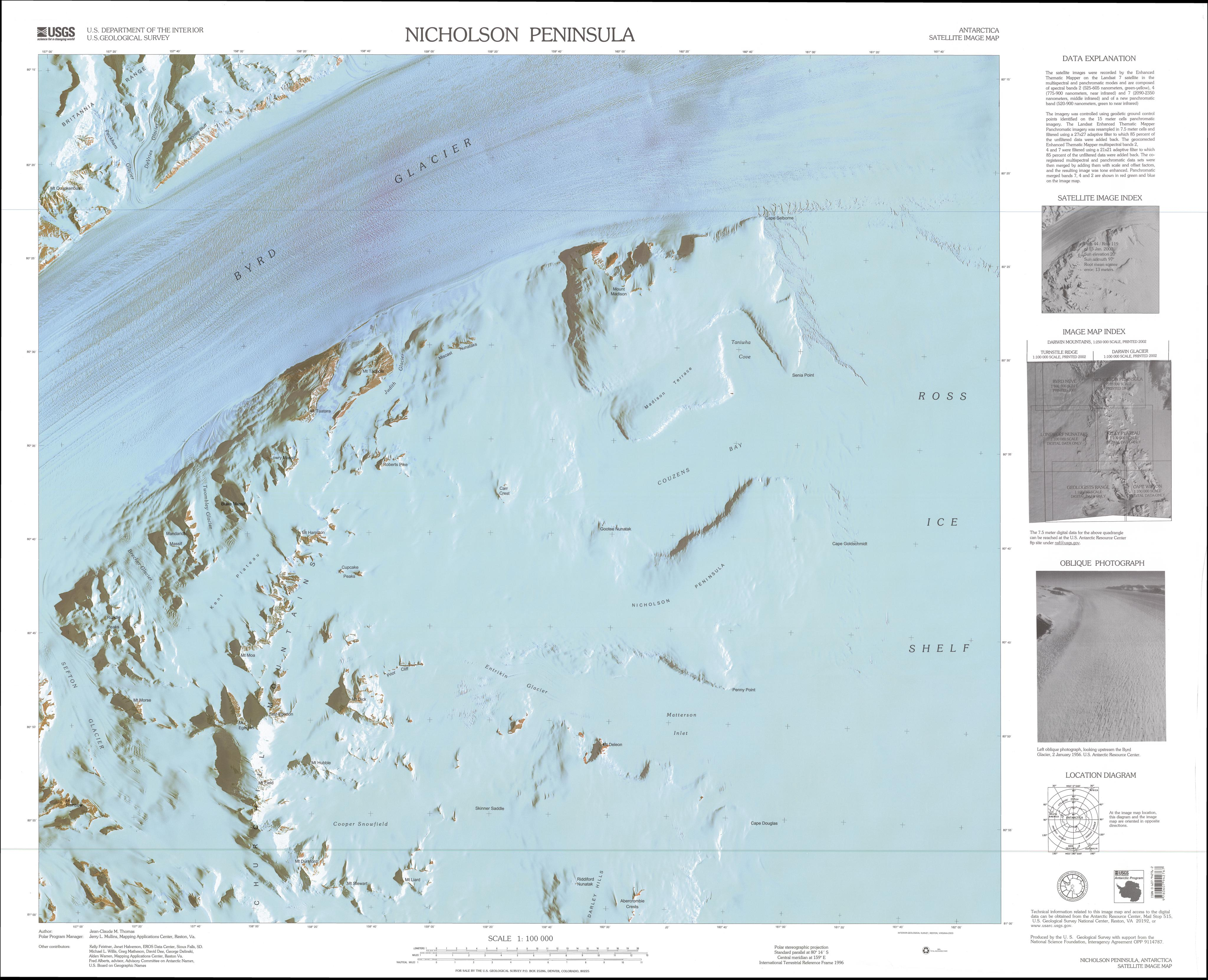
Satellite view of the lower part of the glacier.

=== Barne Inlet ===
80°15′S 160°15′E A reentrant about 17 miles (27 km) wide occupied by the lower part of Byrd Glacier, lying between Cape Kerr and Cape Selborne on the west side of the Ross Ice Shelf. Discovered by the BrNAE (1901-04) and named for Lt. Michael Barne, RN, a member of the expedition, who with Sub-Lt. George F.A. Mulock, RN, mapped the coastline this far south in 1903.

=== Cape Kerr ===
80°03′S 160°26′E A high snow-covered cape at the north side of Barne Inlet, the terminus of Byrd Glacier at the W side of the Ross Ice Shelf. Discovered by the BrNAE (1901-04) and named for Admiral of the Fleet, Lord Walter Kerr, one of the Sea Lords who lent his assistance to the expedition.

=== Cape Selborne ===
80°23′S 160°45′E. A high snow-covered cape at the south side of Barne Inlet, the terminus of Byrd Glacier at the west side of the Ross Ice Shelf. Discovered by the BrNAE (1901-04) and named for William Waldegrave Palmer Selborne, Second Earl of Selborne, who entered the Cabinet as First Lord of the Admiralty in 1900. Not: Cape Selbourne, Cape Selhora.

== Left tributaries ==
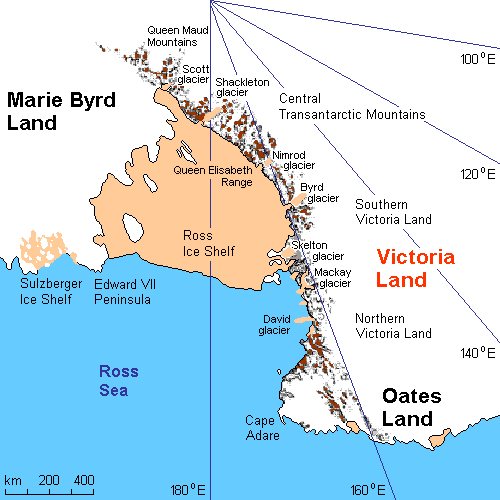
Area map of Byrd glacier.

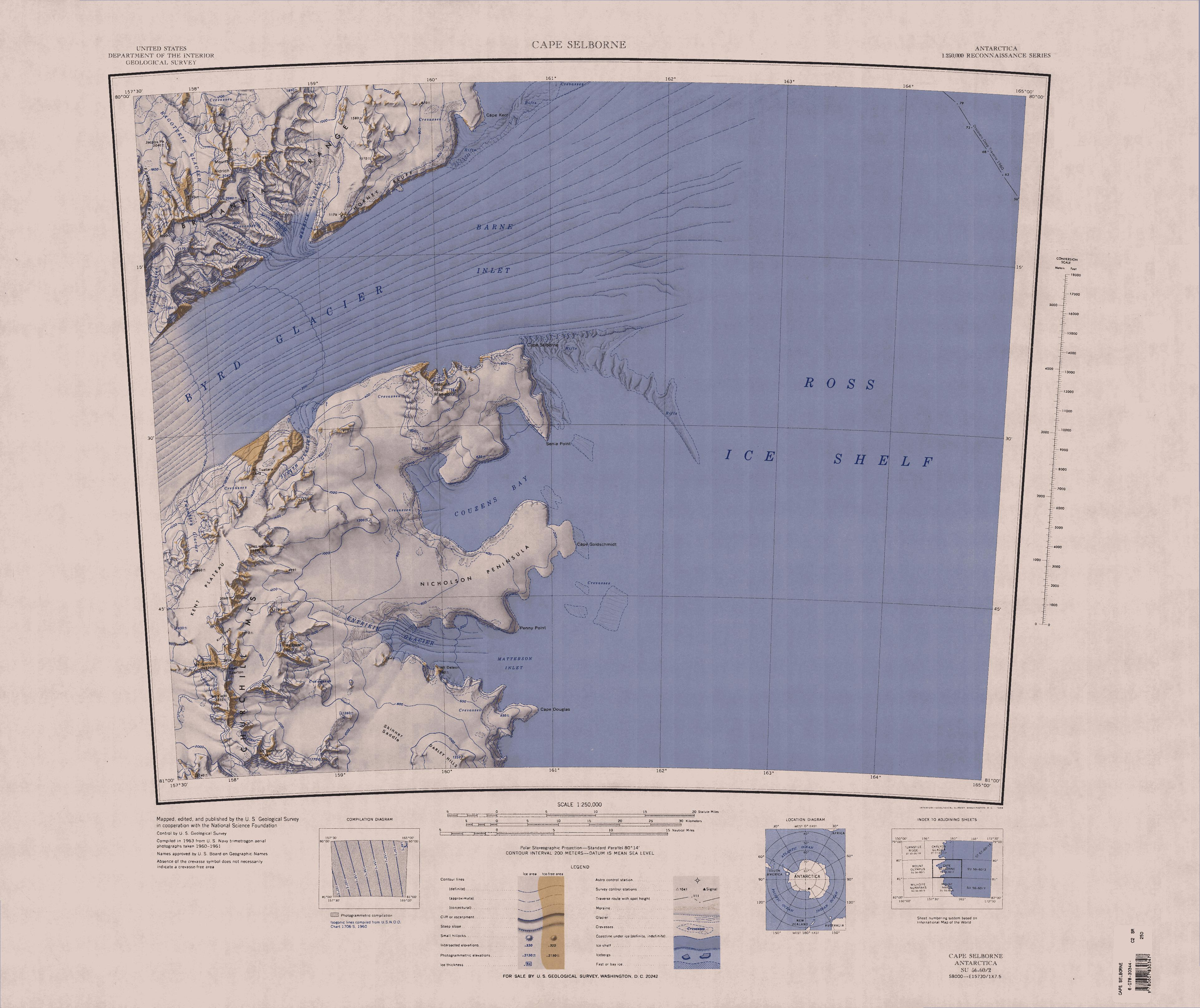
Lower part of Byrd Glacier (northwest)

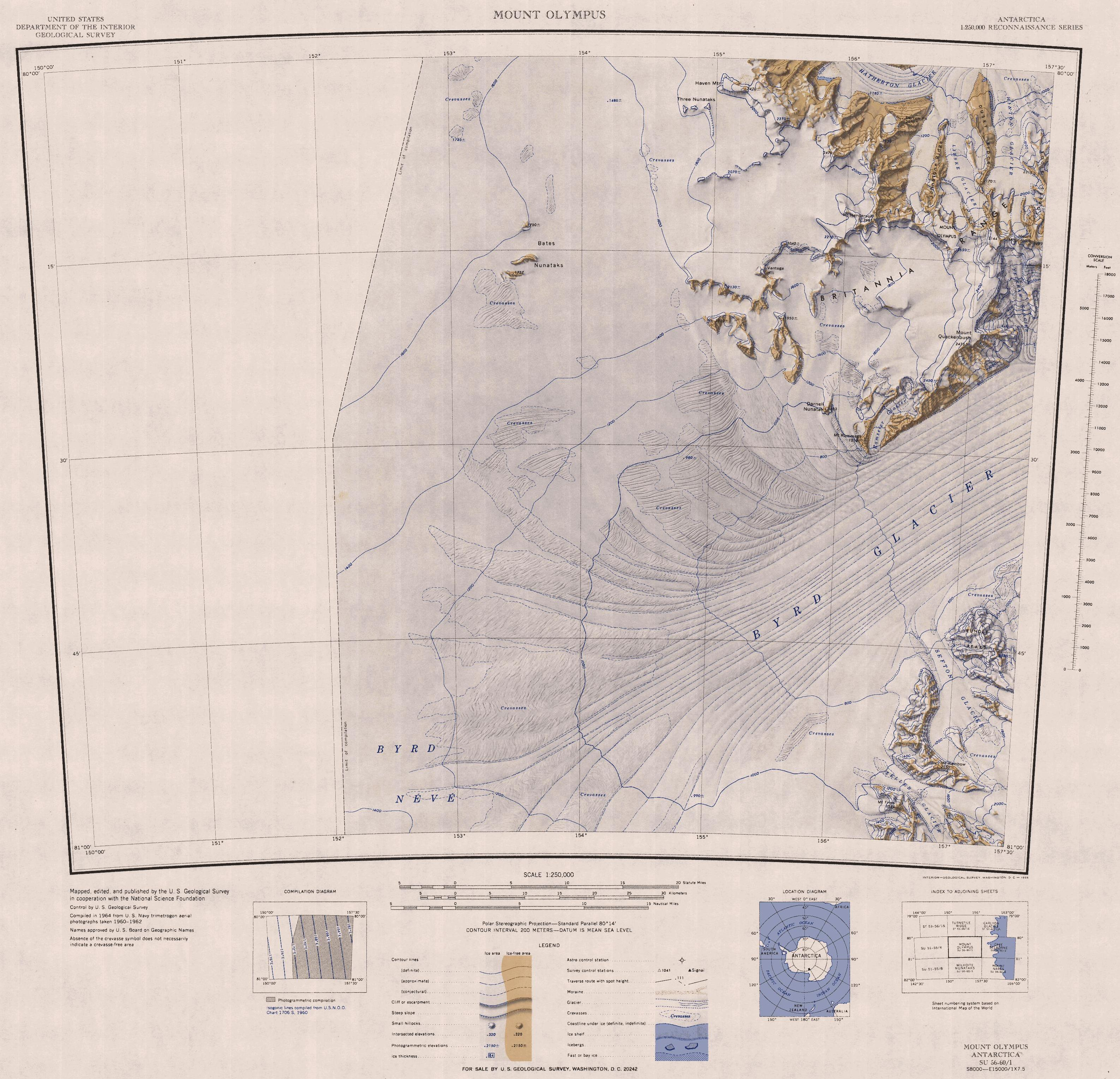
Upper part of Byrd Glacier

Tributaries entering the left (north) side of the glacier from the Brittania Range are, from west to east:

=== Ramseier Glacier ===
80°30′S 156°18′E. Steep cirque-type glacier, 5 miles (8.0 km) long, flowing southwest to enter Byrd Glacier immediately east of Mount Rummage. Named by the US-ACAN for Réne O. Ramseier, glaciologist at McMurdo and´South Pole Stations, 1960-61 and 1961-62 seasons.

=== Peckham Glacier ===
80°21′S 157°25′E. A steep tributary glacier, flowing south from Mount McClintock into Byrd Glacier. Named by US-ACAN for Verne E. Peckham, biologist, McMurdo Station winter party 1962, who with use of SCUBA gear made numerous dives under the sea ice of McMurdo Sound at Winter Quarters Bay and off Cape Evans.

=== DeVries Glacier ===
80°20′S 157°30′E A steep tributary glacier just east of Peckham Glacier, flowing from the south slopes of the Britannia Range into Byrd Glacier. Named by US-ACAN for Arthur L. DeVries, USARP biologist at McMurdo Station in the 1961-62 and 1963-64 summer seasons.

=== Yancey Glacier ===
80°14′S 158°30′E. A precipitous glacier, flowing east from the vicinity of Mount McClintock and then southeastward to enter Byrd Glacier just west of Sennet Glacier. Named by US-ACAN in association with nearby Byrd Glacier for the USS Yancey, cargo ship (Central Group of Task Force 68) of USN OpHjp, 1946-47, led by Admiral Byrd.

=== Sennet Glacier ===
80°12′S 158°42′E. A precipitous glacier between Yancey and Merrick Glaciers, flowing southward from Mount Aldrich to the Byrd Glacier. Named by US-ACAN, ACAN, in association with Byrd Glacier, for the USS Sennet, submarine (Central Group 'of Task Force 68) of USN OpHjp, 1946-47, led by Admiral Byrd.

=== Merrick Glacier ===
80°13′S 158°52′E. A steep tributary glacier just east of Sennet Glacier, descending southwestward to enter Byrd Glacier at the west end of Horney Bluff. Named by US-ACAN, in association with nearby Byrd Glacier, for the USS Merrick, cargo ship (Central Group of Task Force 68) of USN Operation Highjump, 1946-47, led by Admiral Byrd.

=== Hourihan Glacier ===
80.1333333°S 158.75°E Glacier draining the south slopes of Ward Tower, and flowing southeast to Merrick Glacier. Named by the US-ACAN in association with Byrd Glacier and Merrick Glacier, after Captain Joseph J. Hourihan, United States Navy, captain of USS Merrick, a cargo vessel of United States Navy Operation Highjump, 1946-47, led by Admiral Richard E. Byrd.

== Right tributaries ==
Tributaries entering the right (south) side of the glacier are:

=== Zeller Glacier ===
80°55′S 156°30′E. A glacier about 10 miles (16 km) long, flowing west-north-west to enter the south side of Byrd Glacier just north of Mount Fries. Named by US-ACAN for Edward J. Zeller, geologist at McMurdo Station, 1959-60 and 1960-61 seasons.

=== Sefton Glacier ===
80°45′S 156°52′E. Glacier about 10 miles (16 km) long, flowing into the south side of Byrd Glacier just west of Rundle Peaks. Named by the US-ACAN for Ronald Sefton, ionospheric physicist, a member of the Byrd Station winter parties of 1962 and 1964.

=== Twombley Glacier ===
80°35′S 157°45′E A glacier 6 miles (9.7 km) long, flowing from the north side of the Kent Plateau into the south side of Byrd Glacier. Named by US-ACAN for C.E. Twombley of the U.S. Weather Bureau, a member of the Little America V winter party, 1956.

=== Brecher Glacier ===
80°42′S 157°28′E. A broad glacier 5 nautical miles (9 km) long in the north Churchill Mountains that flows north between the Rundle Peaks and Mandarich Massif into Byrd Glacier. It was named after Henry H. Brecher of the Byrd Polar Research Center, Ohio State University; he conducted Antarctic glaciological investigations for over 30 years, 1960–95, including determinations of surface velocities and elevations on Byrd Glacier.

=== Judith Glacier ===
80°29′S 158°49′E. Glacier about 9 miles (14 km) long, flowing from the vicinity of Mount Hamilton northeastward to enter Byrd Glacier just east of Mount Tuatara. Named by US-ACAN for Cdr. J.H. Judith, USN, commanding officer of the Edisto during USN OpDFrz 1964.

== Névé ==
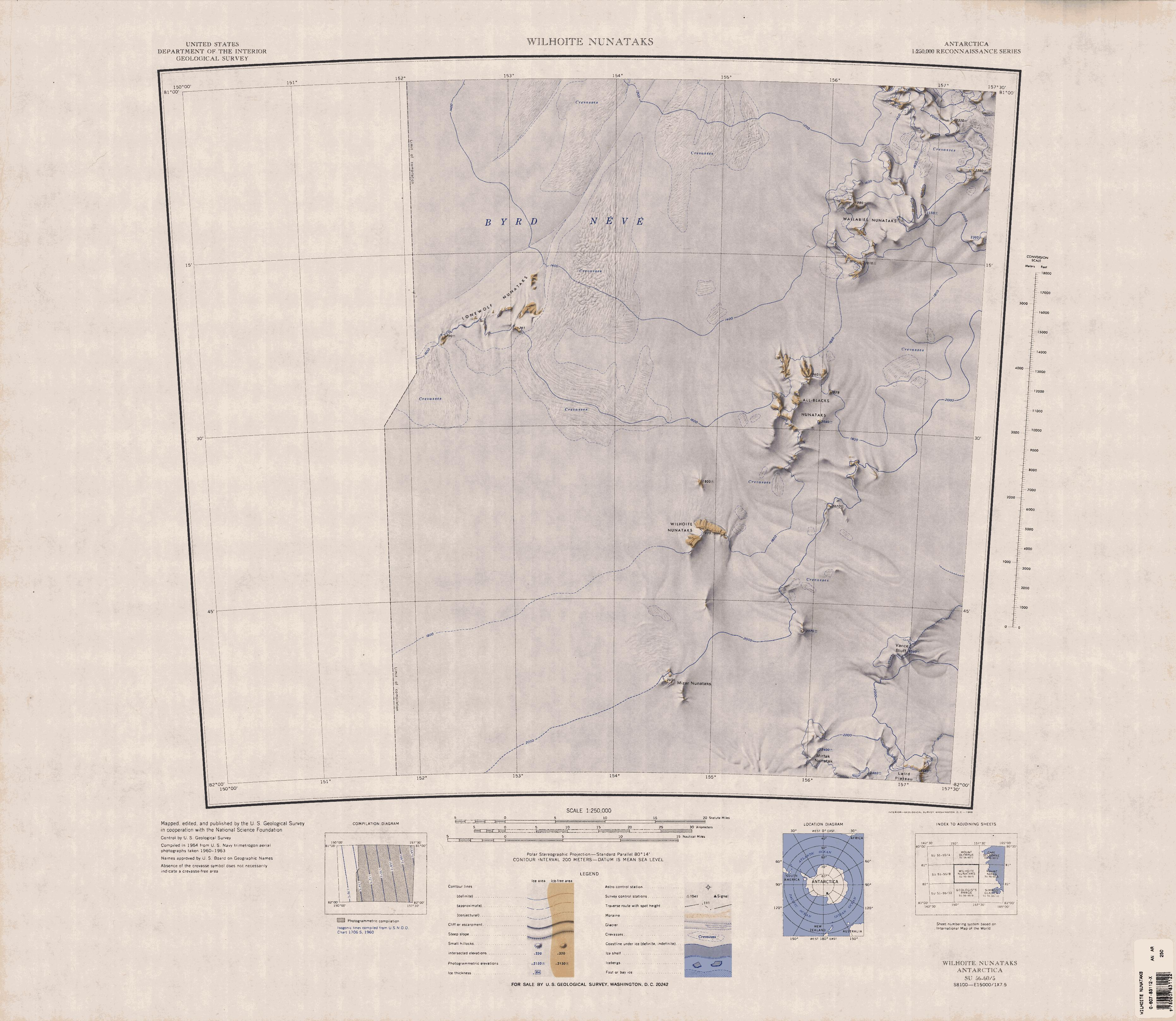
Byrd Névé (northwest)

The large névé at the head of the Byrd Glacier has several nunataks in or around it. It is fed by a number of glaciers.

=== Byrd Névé ===
81°00′S 154°00′E An immense névé at the head of Byrd Glacier. Named by the NZ-APC in association with Byrd Glacier.

=== Gamble Glacier ===
81°6′S 156°45′E. A glacier flowing northwest from Chapman Snowfield, and located between Green Nunatak at the southwest and Keating Massif at the northeast. It was named in honor of John A. Gamble, a geological scientist at the Victoria University of Wellington. He spent five field seasons (during 1984–93) in Antarctica working on mantle and crustal xenolith studies to understand the nature of the West Antarctic lithosphere. He has worked in Marie Byrd Land, including the West Antarctica Volcano Expedition (1989–92), and on the volcanoes in McMurdo Sound.

=== Bledisloe Glacier ===
81°22′S 156°21′E. A glacier flowing north west between All-Blacks Nunataks and Wallabies Nunataks. It was named in association with the adjacent All-Blacks and Wallabies Nunataks, and specifically named after the Bledisloe Cup, which is contested between the New Zealand and Australian rugby union teams, the All-Blacks and the Wallabies.

=== Skellerup Glacier ===
81°38′S 155°42′E. A glacier flowing west north west between All-Blacks Nunataks and Wilhoite Nunataks, west of the Churchill Mountains. Named in honor of Peter Skellerup (1918–2006), who sponsored the Antarctic wing at Canterbury Museum. He was particularly keen on scientific research and donated money to build a specialist Antarctic Library at the Museum. He also donated a large collection of Antarctic materials to the Museum, including some very old and rare Antarctic manuscripts. He remained interested in the collection and continued his sponsorship and donations over more than 30 years.

=== Bates Nunataks ===
80°15′S 153°30′E. Three isolated nunataks in the névé of Byrd Glacier, 18 miles (29 km) west of Vantage Hill, Britannia Range. Discovered by the Darwin Glacier Party of the CTAE (1956-58). Named by the NZ-APC for J. Bates, a member of CTAE who accompanied Sir Edmund Hillary to the South Pole.

=== Tyke Nunatak ===
80.2166667°S 153.5833333°E. The smallest and northernmost of the Bates Nunataks at the west end of the Britannia Range. So named because of its small size in relation to the two southern nunataks in the group.

=== Littleblack Nunataks ===
81°35′S 156°20′E A group of about a dozen black nunataks at the southeast side of the Byrd Neve. This scattered group lies 4 miles (6.4 km) southeast of All-Blacks Nunataks and 15 miles (24 km) southwest of Mount Nares of the Churchill Mountains. Charted and descriptively named by the NZGSAE, 1960-61.

=== Wallabies Nunataks ===
81°12′S 156°20′E. A large group of nunataks near the polar plateau, lying 10 miles (16 km) northeast of All-Blacks Nunataks at the east side of the Byrd Névé. Named by the NZGSAE (1960-61) for the well known Australian rugby team.

== Sources ==
- "About - British Antarctic Survey", www.bas.ac.uk, archived from the original on 26 September 2015
- Alberts, Fred G., ed. (1995), Geographic Names of the Antarctic (PDF) (2 ed.), United States Board on Geographic Names This article incorporates public domain material from websites or documents of the United States Board on Geographic Names.
- "Bledisloe Glacier", Geographic Names Information System, United States Geological Survey, United States Department of the Interior
- "Brecher Glacier", Geographic Names Information System, United States Geological Survey, United States Department of the Interior
- "Gamble Glacier", Geographic Names Information System, United States Geological Survey, United States Department of the Interior
- "Hourihan Glacier", Geographic Names Information System, United States Geological Survey, United States Department of the Interior
- "Skellerup Glacier", Geographic Names Information System, United States Geological Survey, United States Department of the Interior
- "Tyke Nunatak", Geographic Names Information System, United States Geological Survey, United States Department of the Interior
- This article incorporates public domain material from websites or documents of the United States Geological Survey.
