= Cape Kerr =

Cape in Antarctica

Cape Kerr (80°3′S 160°26′E) is a high snow-covered cape at the north side of Barne Inlet, the terminus of Byrd Glacier at the west side of the Ross Ice Shelf, Antarctica. It was discovered by the British National Antarctic Expedition (1901–1904) and named for Admiral of the Fleet, Lord Walter Kerr, one of the Sea Lords who lent his assistance to the expedition.
