= Mount McClintock =

Mountain in Antarctica, claimed by Australia

- Location within Antarctica

Highest point
- Elevation: 3,490 m (11,450 ft)
- Prominence: 1,621 m (5,318 ft)
- Listing: Ultra, Ribu
- Coordinates: 80°13′S 157°26′E

Geography
- Location: Antarctica
- Parent range: Britannia Range

Mount McClintock (80°13′S 157°26′E) is the highest mountain (3,490 m; 11,450 ft) in the Britannia Range in Antarctica, surmounting the south end of Forbes Ridge, 6 nautical miles (11 km; 6.9 mi) east of Mount Olympus.

== Discovery and name ==
Mount McClintock was discovered by the British National Antarctic Expedition (BrNAE; 1901–04) and named for Admiral Sir Leopold McClintock, Royal Navy, a member of the Ship Committee for the expedition.

== Location ==
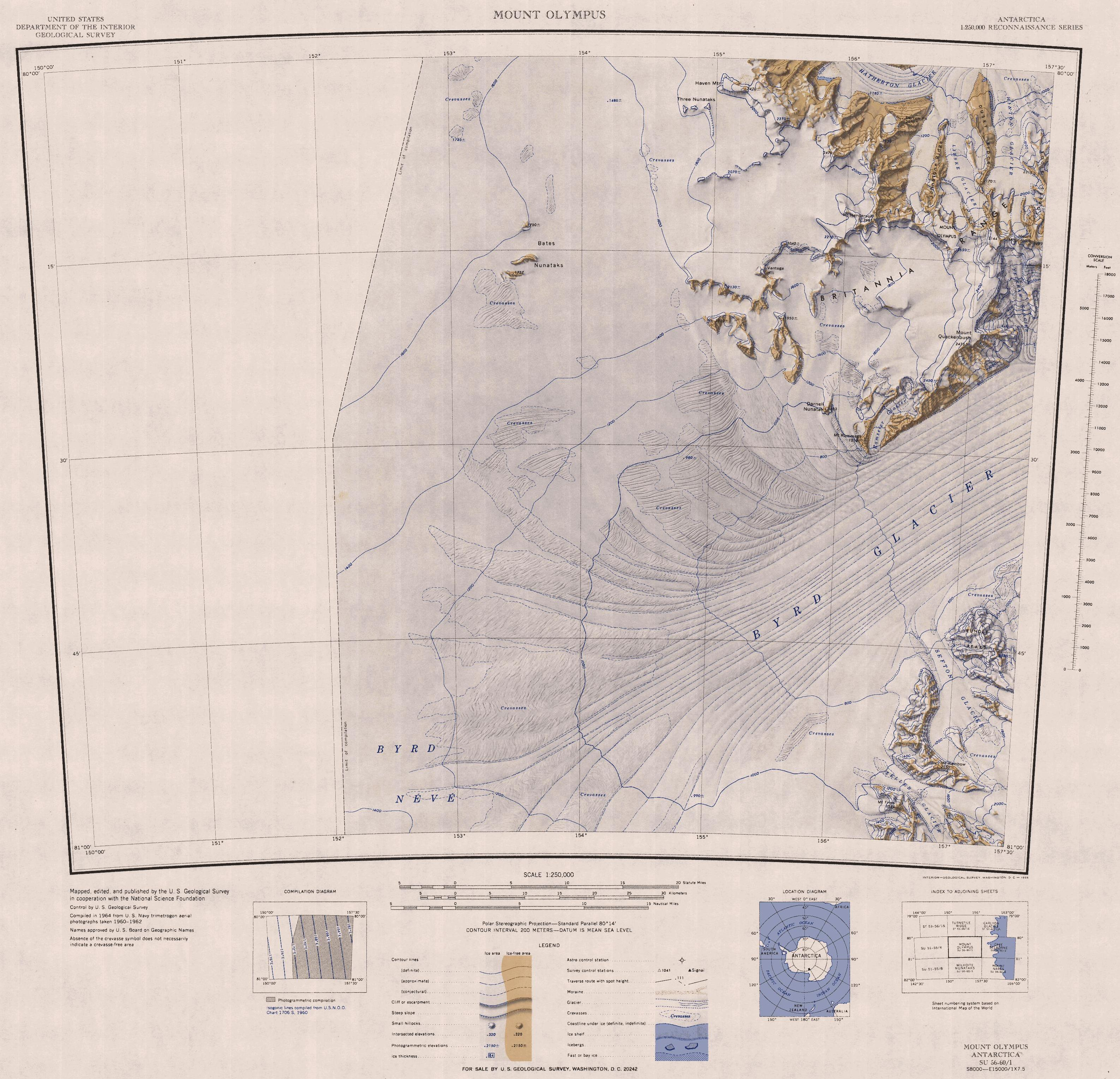
Mount Olympus towards northeast

Mount McClintock is in the central Britannia Range to the east of Mount Olympus. Forbes Ridge extends north from the mountain to the east of Hinton Glacier. Dusky Ridge extends north between Hinton Glacier and Lieske Glacier. Johnstone Ridge extends north from Mount Olympus to the west of Lieske Glacier. Peckham Glacier flows south from Mount McClintock into Byrd Glacier. Mount Quackenbush is to the southwest, and Mount Aldrich is to the northeast.

It is located within the claimed Australian Antarctic Territory and is therefore claimed as Australia's highest peak.

== Western features ==
Features to the west of the mountain include:

=== Mount Olympus ===
80°13′S 156°46′E. A rectangular, flat, ice-covered mountain over 2,400 metres (7,900 ft) high, standing 5 nautical miles (9.3 km; 5.8 mi) east of Mount Henderson. Named by the United States Advisory Committee on Antarctic Names (US-ACAN), in association with nearby Byrd Glacier, after the Mount Olympus, flagship of United States Navy Operation Highjump, 1946–47, led by Admiral Richard E. Byrd.

=== Moore Pinnacle ===
80.21667°S 156.81667°E A solitary peak rising to 2,650 metres (8,690 ft) high in the south part of Mount Olympus. In association with Mount Olympus and Byrd Glacier, named after Captain R.R. Moore, United States Navy, commanding officer of USS Mount Olympus, flagship of United States Navy Operation Highjump, 1946–47, led by Admiral Richard E. Byrd.

=== Johnstone Ridge ===
80°08′S 156°40′E. A mainly ice-free ridge, extending 7 nautical miles (13 km; 8.1 mi) north from Mount Olympus toward the south side of Hatherton Glacier. Named by US-ACAN for Graeme N. Johnstone, a member of the Byrd Substation auroral party, winter 1962, and the McMurdo Station winter party, 1964.

=== Dusky Ridge ===
80°05′S 157°02′E. An ice-free rock ridge, 9 nautical miles (17 km; 10 mi) long and 2 nautical miles (3.7 km; 2.3 mi) wide, between Lieske and Hinton Glaciers. Named "Dusky Mountains" by the Darwin Glacier Party of the Commonwealth Trans-Antarctic Expedition (CTAE) (1956–58) because of the lack of snow on its slopes. The name was amended to Dusky Ridge following remapping of the feature by the USGS from surveys and United States Navy air photos, 1960–62.

=== Dusky Ledge ===
80.03333°S 156.95°E. An area of relatively level exposed rock about 1,100 metres (3,600 ft) high that forms the north part of Dusky Ridge. Named by US-ACAN in association with Dusky Ridge.

=== Forbes Ridge ===
80°09′S 157°30′E. A ridge about 7 nautical miles (13 km; 8.1 mi) long in the Britannia Range, extending north from Mount McClintock along the east side of Hinton Glacier. Named by the US-ACAN for Robert B. Forbes of the University of Alaska, who made geological studies in the McMurdo Sound area with United States Navy Operation Deep Freeze, 1955–56, and during the summer season, 1962–63.

=== Berry Bastion ===
80.21667°S 157.18333°E A large, mostly ice-covered mountain with abrupt north facing rock cliffs. It rises to 3,144 metres (10,315 ft) between Mount Olympus and Mount McClintock. Named by US-ACAN after M. John Berry, Assistant Secretary for Policy, Management and Budget, United States Department of the Interior, 1997–2000.

== Eastern features ==
Features to the east of the mountain include:

=== Dartmouth Peak ===
80.2°S 157.68333°E A peak (3,320 metres; 10,890 ft), 2.8 nautical miles (5.2 km; 3.2 mi) east-northeast of Mount McClintock. Named by US-ACAN in association with HMS Britannia after Dartmouth, a seaport of Devonshire, England, on the west bank of the River Dart estuary. From 1863 until 1905, British naval cadets (including some officers of Robert Falcon Scott's British National Antarctic Expedition, 1901–04) received Royal Navy officer training in HMS Britannia, then berthed at Dartmouth.

=== Warburton Ledge ===
80.21667°S 157.78333°E A massive flat ridge about 3,200 metres (10,500 ft) high that is ice-covered and steep-sided, located 4 nautical miles (7.4 km; 4.6 mi) east of Mount McClintock. Named by US-ACAN after Joseph A. Warburton, Desert Research Institute, University of Nevada, Reno, United States Antarctic Research Program (United States ArmyRP) scientist in charge of the RISP meteorological program, 1974–75 field season.

=== Mount Askin ===
80.16667°S 157.88333°E A flat-topped mountain about 3,000 metres (9,800 ft) high, between Mount McClintock and Mount Aldrich. Named by US-ACAN after Rosemary A. Askin, geologist, Byrd Polar Research Center, Ohio State University, who, 1970–2000, worked in such diverse parts of Antarctica as Antarctic Peninsula, South Shetland Islands, Victoria Land and the Transantarctic Mountains, including the general vicinity of this mountain.

=== Icenhower Ridge ===
80.21667°S 158.41667°E A broad, mainly ice-covered ridge that rises to over 1,600 metres (5,200 ft) high between Yancey Glacier and Sennet Glacier. Named by US-ACAN in association with Byrd Glacier and Sennet Glacier, after Commander Joseph B. Icenhower, United States Navy, captain of USS Sennet, a submarine (Central Group of Task Force 68) of United States Navy Operation Highjump, 1946–47, led by Admiral Richard Byrd.

=== Cohn Bluff ===
80.25°S 158.5°E A rock bluff about 400 metres (1,300 ft) high in the south part of Britannia Range. The bluff marks the south side of the terminus of Yancey Glacier at the juncture with Byrd Glacier. Named by US-ACAN in association with Byrd Glacier and Yancey Glacier, after Captain J.E. Cohn, United States Navy, captain of USS Yancey, a cargo ship of United States Navy Operation Highjump, 1946–47.

== See also ==
- List of ultras of Antarctica

== Sources ==
- Alberts, Fred G., ed. (1995), Geographic Names of the Antarctic (PDF) (2 ed.), United States Board on Geographic Names This article incorporates public domain material from websites or documents of the United States Board on Geographic Names.
- "Berry Bastion", Geographic Names Information System, United States Geological Survey, United States Department of the Interior
- "Cohn Bluff", Geographic Names Information System, United States Geological Survey, United States Department of the Interior
- "Dartmouth Peak", Geographic Names Information System, United States Geological Survey, United States Department of the Interior
- "Dusky Ledge", Geographic Names Information System, United States Geological Survey, United States Department of the Interior
- "Icenhower Ridge", Geographic Names Information System, United States Geological Survey, United States Department of the Interior
- "Mount Askin", Geographic Names Information System, United States Geological Survey, United States Department of the Interior
- Mount Olympus, USGS United States Geologic Survey, 1960
- "Moore Pinnacle", Geographic Names Information System, United States Geological Survey, United States Department of the Interior
- "Warburton Ledge", Geographic Names Information System, United States Geological Survey, United States Department of the Interior

This article incorporates public domain material from websites or documents of the United States Geological Survey.
