= Mount Henderson =

Mount Henderson may refer to one of several various mountains, including:

in Antarctica:

- Mount Henderson (White Island)
- Mount Henderson (Britannia Range)
- Mount Henderson (Holme Bay)

elsewhere:

- Mount Henderson (Washington), in the Olympic Mountains
