= Mount Henderson (Britannia Range) =

Mountain in Oates Land, Antarctica

- Location within Antarctica

Highest point
- Coordinates: 80°12′S 156°13′E

Geography
- Continent: Antarctica
- Parent range: Britannia Range

Mount Henderson (80°12′S 156°13′E) is a prominent mountain. It is 2,660 metres (8,730 ft) high, and stands 5 nautical miles (9.3 km; 5.8 mi) west of Mount Olympus in the Britannia Range of Antarctica. Discovered and named by the British National Antarctic Expedition, 1901-04.

== Location ==
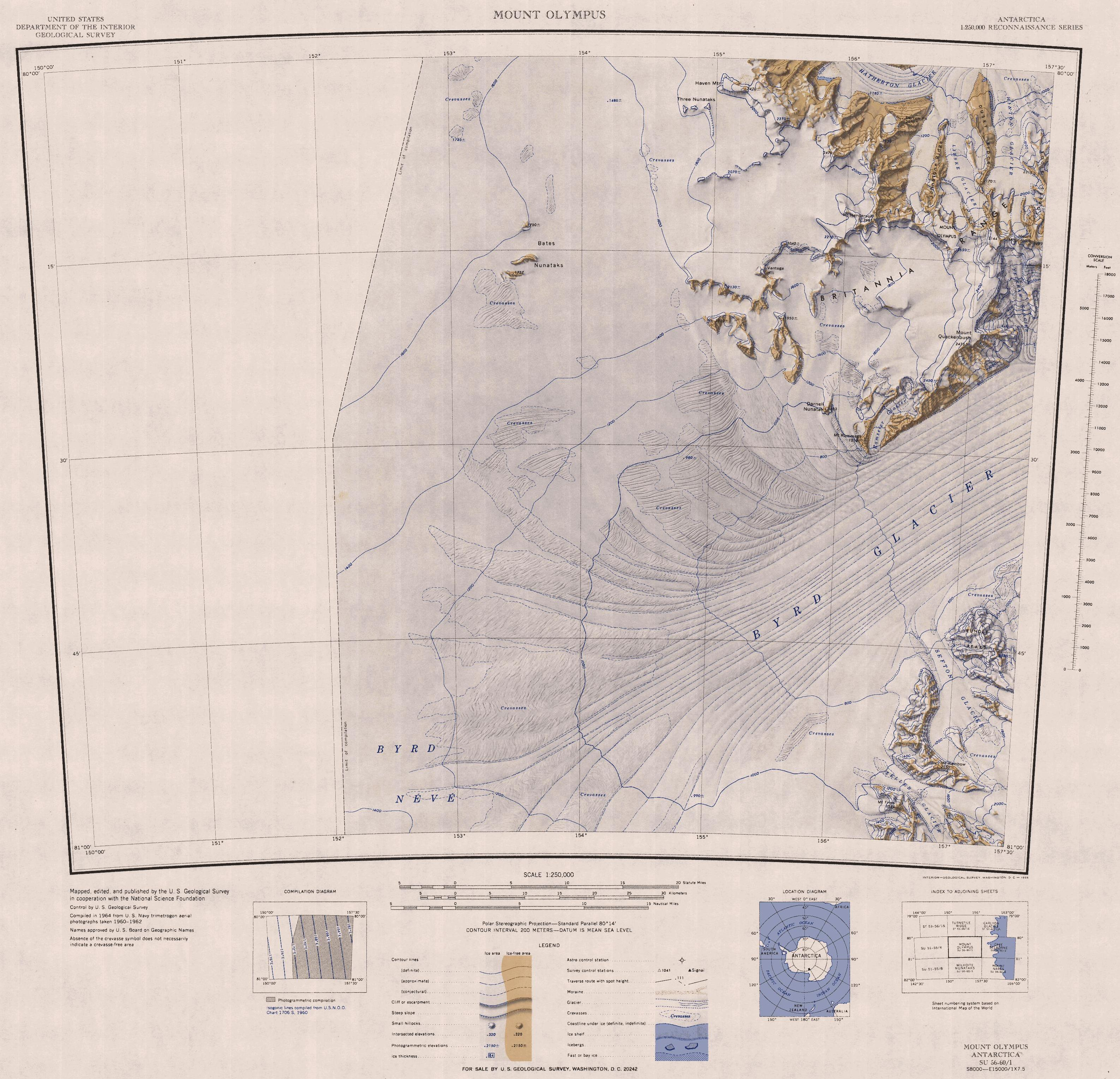
Mount Henderson towards the northeast

Mount Henderson is in the western Britannia Range to the south of Derrick Peak and west of Mount Olympus and Mount McClintock. Mount Quackenbush is to the southeast.

== Features ==
Nearby features include:

=== Mount Selby ===
80°12′S 156°23′E. A mountain rising over 2,200 metres (7,200 ft) high between Mount Henderson and Mount Olympus. Named by the New Zealand Antarctic Place-Names Committee (NZ-APC) for M.J. Selby, Professor of Earth Sciences, University of Waikato, Hamilton, New Zealand. Selby was a member of field parties in Antarctica, 1969–70, 1971–72, and 1978–79, the last doing geological work in Britannia Range.

=== Tamarus Valley ===
80°10′S 156°20′E. Ice-free valley lying south of Sabrina Ridge and 2.5 nautical miles (4.6 km; 2.9 mi) northeast of Mount Henderson. Named in association with Britannia by a University of Waikato (New Zealand) geological party, 1978–79, led by M.J. Selby. Tamarus is the historical name used in Roman Britain for the River Tamar.

=== Tisobis Valley ===
80°11′S 156°20′E. An ice-free valley just northeast of Mount Henderson. Named in association with Britannia by a University of Waikato geological party, 1978–79, led by M.J. Selby. Tisobis is a historical name used in Roman Britain for the Dwyryd River.

=== Krissek Peak ===
80.2166667°S 155.95°E A sharp peak which rises to about 2,500 metres (8,200 ft) high on the southwest ridge from Mount Henderson. Named after geologist Lawrence A. Krissek of the Byrd Polar Research Center and Department of Geology and Mineralogy, Ohio State University, Columbus, Ohio, who worked many austral summers in the central Transantarctic Mountains beginning about 1985-86.

== Sources ==
- Alberts, Fred G., ed. (1995), Geographic Names of the Antarctic (PDF) (2 ed.), United States Board on Geographic Names This article incorporates public domain material from websites or documents of the United States Board on Geographic Names.
- "Krissek Peak", Geographic Names Information System, United States Geological Survey, United States Department of the Interior
- Mount Olympus, USGS United States Geologic Survey, 1960

This article incorporates public domain material from websites or documents of the United States Geological Survey.
