= Mount Aldrich =

Mountain in Oates Land, Antarctica

- Location within Antarctica

Highest point
- Coordinates: 80°7′S 158°13′E

Geography
- Continent: Antarctica
- Parent range: Britannia Range

Mount Aldrich (80°7′S 158°13′E) is a massive, somewhat flat-topped mountain standing at the east side of Ragotzkie Glacier in the Britannia Range, Antarctica.

== Discovery and name ==
Mount Aldrich was discovered by the British National Antarctic Expedition (BrNAE; 1901–04) and named for Admiral Pelham Aldrich, who gave assistance to Robert Falcon Scott in preparing the expedition.

== Location ==
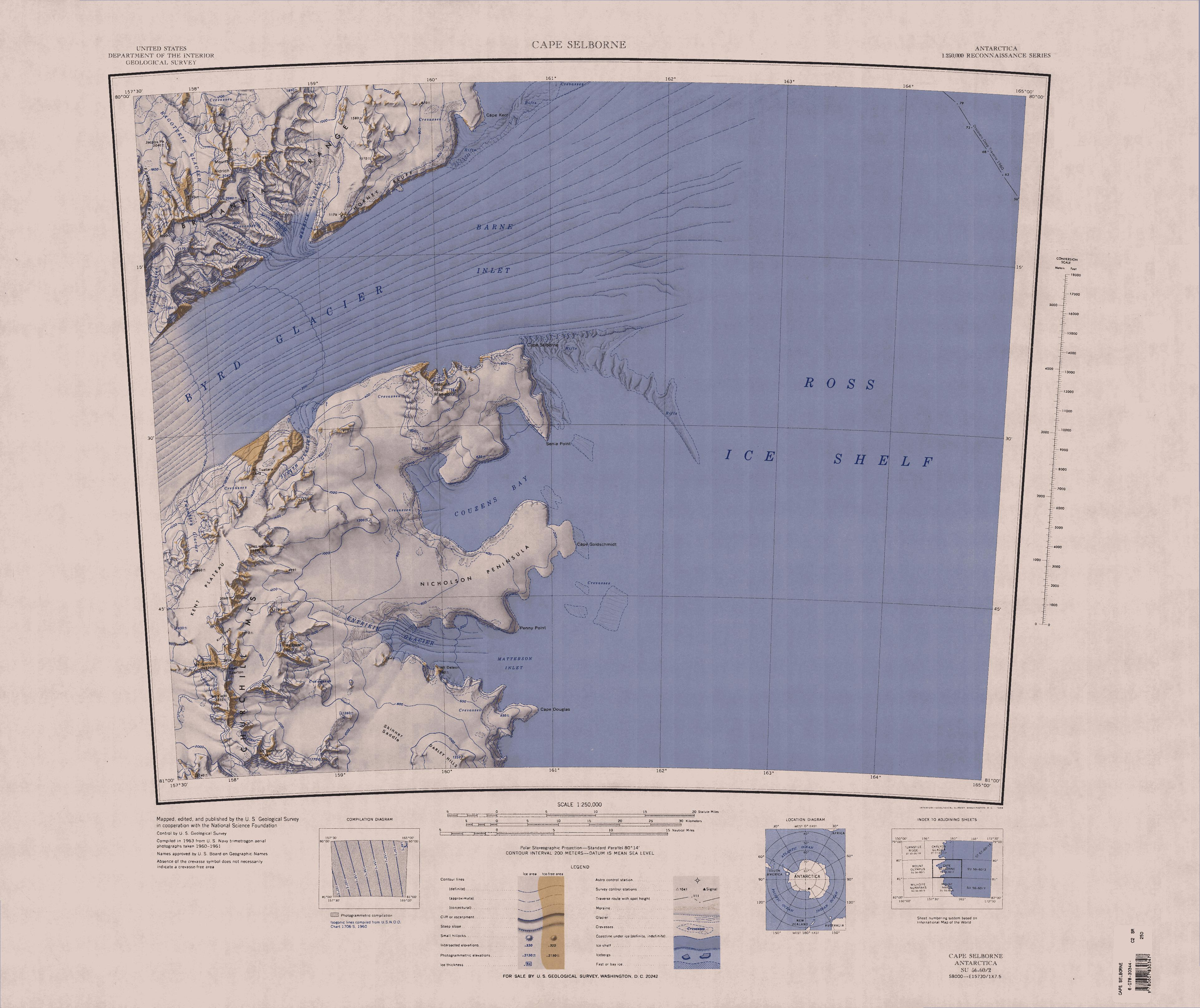
Mount Aldrich in northwest of map

Mount Aldridge is in the east of the Britannia Range. It lies on the main ridge, to the northeast of Mount McClintock, and overlooks the head of the Ragotzkie Glacier to the west. Its southern slopes drain to the Merrick Glacier and to other tributaries of the Byrd Glacier.

== Northern features ==
=== Waldrip Ledge ===
79.95°S 157.7166667°E A conspicuous area of relatively level exposed rock along the north margin of Britannia Range. The feature about 6 square nautical miles (21 km^{2}; 7.9 sq mi) and rising to about 900 metres (3,000 ft) high is located on the east side of the terminus of Ragotzkie Glacier at the juncture with Hatherton Glacier. Named by the Advisory Committee on Antarctic Names (US-ACAN) after Mr. D. Waldrip of Holmes and Narver, Inc., camp manager of the United States Antarctic Research Program (United States ArmyRP) Darwin Glacier Field Camp in the 1978-79 season. The camp was near this feature.

=== Benson Bluff ===
80°S 157.95°E A distinctive triangular rock bluff about 1,300 metres (4,300 ft) high at the west side of Ragotzkie Icefall. Named by the US-ACAN after Dale P. Benson, United States Geological Survey (USGS) cartographer who conducted surveys at South Pole Station, 1993-94, and supported the first airborne GPS controlled photogrammetry project, which established photo control on Black Island and positioned the location of seismographic equipment on the flanks of Mount Erebus.

=== Jacobs Peak ===
80°04′S 157°46′E. A peak, 2,040 metres (6,690 ft) high, surmounting the north end of the ridge which stands on the west side of Ragotzkie Glacier. Named by the US-ACAN for John D. Jacobs, United States exchange observer at Vostok Station in 1964.

=== Ward Tower ===
80.1°S 158.55°E A prominent mountain, 2,760 metres (9,060 ft) high, located 3 nautical miles (5.6 km; 3.5 mi) east-northeast of Mount Aldrich on the main ridge of Britannia Range. Named by the US-ACAN after Commander Edward M. Ward, United States Navy, commanding officer of United States Navy (United States Navy) Squadron VX-6 during Operation Deep Freeze I and II, 1955-56 and 1956-57.

=== Mount Rhone ===
79.9833333°S 158.7333333°E The highest peak 2,020 metres (6,630 ft) high in Bucknell Ridge in the northeast part of Britannia Range. Named by the US-ACAN after Christopher M. Rhone, a communications officer with United States Naval Support Force, Antarctica, 1992-94; Director of Information Systems with ASA, 1994-2000.

=== Bucknell Ridge ===
79°58′S 158°38′E. A mountainous ridge just above the Cranfield Icefalls, extending east-west along the southern side of Darwin Glacier near its mouth. Mapped by the Darwin Glacier Party of the Commonwealth Trans-Antarctic Expedition (CTAE) (1956-58) and named for E.S. Bucknell, a member of the party.

== Southern features ==
=== Johnson Spire ===
79.9833333°S 158.9833333°E. A mountain with a spire-like summit 1,570 metres (5,150 ft) high between Cranfield Icefalls and Gaussiran Glacier in northeast Britannia Range. Named by the US-ACAN after Bradish F. Johnson, Chief Optical Science Laboratory, United States Geological Survey (USGS), with responsibility for calibrating aerial mapping cameras used in Antarctica; conducted GPS observations during United States Geological Survey (USGS)-Ohio State University Transantarctic Mountains Deformation Project, summer 1999-2000.

=== Nebraska Peaks ===
80.0666667°S 159.5°E. A scattered group of peaks and nunataks which lie east of Gaussiran Glacier and Merrick Glacier in the east part of Britannia Range. Named by the US-ACAN after the University of Nebraska, Lincoln, which was the location of the Ross Ice Shelf Project Management Office, 1972-77. Several features in the group have been named after RISP personnel.

=== Borowski Peak ===
80.1833333°S 159.2166667°E. A small but distinctive peak 1,176 metres (3,858 ft) high located 5.6 nautical miles (10.4 km; 6.4 mi) southwest of Rand Peak in Nebraska Peaks. Named by the US-ACAN after D. Borowski, a member of the United States Antarctic Research Program (United States ArmyRP) geophysical party, Ross Ice Shelf Project, 1974-75 field season.

=== Sternberg Peak ===
80.0666667°S 159.6333333°E. A peak about 1,300 metres (4,300 ft) high located 2.7 nautical miles (5.0 km; 3.1 mi) northeast of Rand Peak in Nebraska Peaks. Named by the US-ACAN after B. Sternberg, a member of the geophysical party, Ross Ice Shelf Project, 1973-74 season.

=== Rand Peak ===
80.1°S 159.5°E. A prominent peak 1,510 metres (4,950 ft) high in the south part of Nebraska Peaks, Britannia Range. Named by the US-ACAN after John H. Rand, United States Army Cold Regions Research and Engineering Laboratory (CRREL), who drilled ice core at site J-9 (82?22|S|168?40'W) during the Ross Ice Shelf Project, austral summers 1974-75 and 1976-77.

== Sources ==
- Alberts, Fred G., ed. (1995), Geographic Names of the Antarctic (PDF) (2 ed.), United States Board on Geographic Names This article incorporates public domain material from websites or documents of the United States Board on Geographic Names.
- "Benson Bluff", Geographic Names Information System, United States Geological Survey, United States Department of the Interior
- "Borowski Peak", Geographic Names Information System, United States Geological Survey, United States Department of the Interior
- Cape Selborne, USGS United States Geologic Survey, 1960
- "Johnson Spire", Geographic Names Information System, United States Geological Survey, United States Department of the Interior
- "Mount Rhone", Geographic Names Information System, United States Geological Survey, United States Department of the Interior
- "Nebraska Peaks", Geographic Names Information System, United States Geological Survey, United States Department of the Interior
- "Rand Peak", Geographic Names Information System, United States Geological Survey, United States Department of the Interior
- "Sternberg Peak", Geographic Names Information System, United States Geological Survey, United States Department of the Interior
- "Waldrip Ledge", Geographic Names Information System, United States Geological Survey, United States Department of the Interior
- "Ward Tower", Geographic Names Information System, United States Geological Survey, United States Department of the Interior

This article incorporates public domain material from websites or documents of the United States Geological Survey.
