= Névé =

Young, granular type of snow

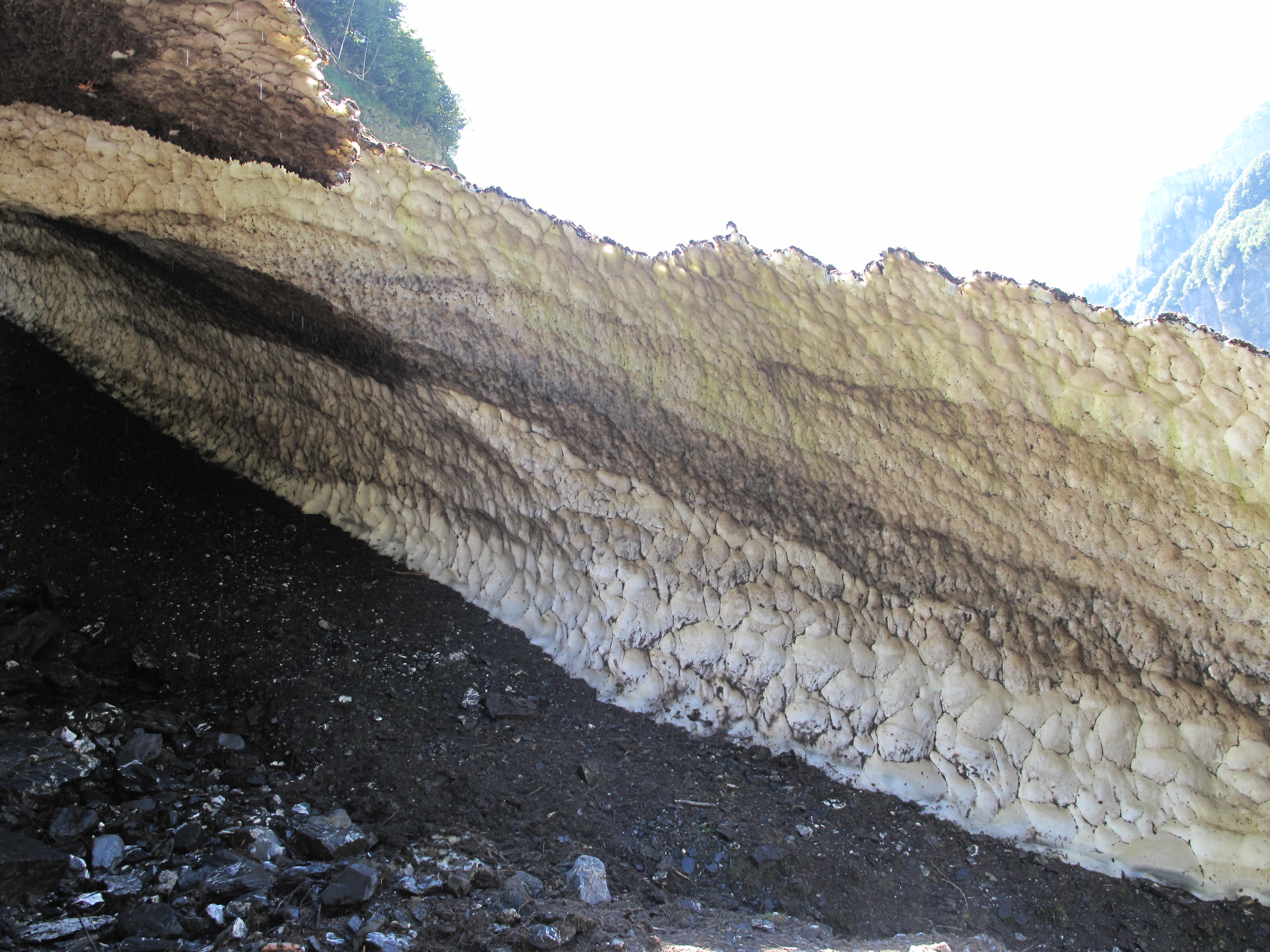
Névé in a valley of Haute-Savoie, France

Névé (/neɪˈveɪ/ nay-VAY) is a young, granular type of snow which has been partially melted, refrozen and compacted, yet precedes the form of ice. This type of snow can contribute to glacier formation through the process of nivation. Névé that survives a full season of ablation turns into firn, which is both older and slightly denser. Firn eventually becomes glacial ice – the long-lived, compacted ice that glaciers are composed of. Glacier formation can take years to hundreds of years, depending on freeze-thaw factors and snow-compaction rates. Névé is annually observed in skiing slopes, and is generally disliked as an icy falling zone.

Névé has a minimum density of 500 kg/m^{3}, which is roughly half of the density of liquid water at 1 atm.

Névé can also refer to the alpine region in which snowfall accumulates, becomes névé, and feeds a glacier.

== See also ==
- Suncup
