= Bowling Green =

A bowling green is a lawn used for playing the game of bowls.

Bowling Green may also refer to:

== Places ==
=== United States ===
Listed alphabetically by state in each sub-section

==== County seats ====
- Bowling Green, Kentucky, a home rule-class city and the county seat of Warren County
  - Bowling Green metropolitan area, Kentucky
- Bowling Green, Missouri, a city and the county seat of Pike County
- Bowling Green, Ohio, a city and the county seat of Wood County; home to Bowling Green State University
- Bowling Green, Virginia, an incorporated town and the county seat of Caroline County

==== Other communities ====
- Bowling Green, Florida, a city
- Bowling Green Township, Fayette County, Illinois
- Bowling Green, Indiana, an unincorporated community
- Bowling Green, Maryland, an unincorporated community
- Bowling Green Township, Chariton County, Missouri
- Bowling Green Township, Pettis County, Missouri, an inactive township
- Bowling Green Township, Licking County, Ohio
- Bowling Green Township, Marion County, Ohio
- Bowling Green, Pennsylvania, an unincorporated community
- Bowling Green, South Carolina, an unincorporated community

==== Other places ====
- Bowling Green (New York City), a public park in Lower Manhattan

=== United Kingdom ===
All located within England

- Bowling Green, Callington, a hamlet in the civil parish of Callington
- Bowling Green, Cornwall, a hamlet in the civil parish of Treverbyn
- Bowling Green, Hampshire, a hamlet north of Pennington, Hampshire
- Bowling Green, Shropshire, near the hamlet of Peplow in the civil parish of Hodnet
- Bowling Green, Worcestershire, a village in Worcestershire
- RSPB Bowling Green Marsh, a nature reserve in Devon

=== Elsewhere ===
- Bowling Green, Amaranth, Ontario, Canada
- Bowling Green, Chatham-Kent, Ontario, Canada
- Bowling Green, Wiesbaden, a park in Germany
- Bowling Green Bay National Park, in Queensland, Australia

== Education ==
Note: the largest so-named school in the United States is Bowling Green State University in Ohio.

- Bowling Green City School District, Ohio, U.S.
- Bowling Green College of Commerce, now part of Western Kentucky University in Bowling Green, Kentucky, U.S.
- Bowling Green High School, several American high schools
- Bowling Green School, in Franklinton, Louisiana, U.S.
- Bowling Green State University, located in Bowling Green, Ohio, U.S.

== Geography ==
- Argyll's Bowling Green, a peninsula within Loch Lomond and The Trossachs National Park, Scotland, U.K.
- Bowling Green Col, in the Cook Mountains of Antarctica
- Bowling Green Dolomite, a geologic formation in Missouri, U.S.
- Bowling Green Plateau, in the Cook Mountains in Antarctica

== Music ==
- "Bowling Green" (song), a 1967 single by The Everly Brothers
- Bowling Green (album), a 1956 album of Appalachian folk music recorded by the Kossoy Sisters

== Sports ==
- Bowling Green Ballpark, a stadium in Kentucky, U.S.
- Bowling Green Barons, a defunct minor-league baseball team based in Kentucky, U.S.
- Bowling Green Falcons, the athletic program of Bowling Green State University in Ohio, U.S.
- Bowling Green Ground, a former football ground in Gainsborough, England, U.K.
- Bowling Green Hot Rods, a minor-league baseball team based in Kentucky, U.S.
- Bowling Green Stakes, an American thoroughbred horse race held annually in Saratoga Springs, New York, U.S.
- Southampton Old Bowling Green, the world's oldest surviving bowling green, located in Southampton, England, U.K.

== Structures ==
- Bowling Green Assembly Plant, an automobile factory in Bowling Green, Kentucky, U.S.
- Bowling Green Offices Building, in New York City
- Bowling Green Organizational Maintenance Shop No. 10, a historic building in Kentucky, U.S.
- Cape Bowling Green Light, in Queensland, Australia
- Devil's Bowling Green Battery, a 19th-century artillery battery in Gibraltar

== Transportation ==
- Bowling Green station, a subway station on the IRT Lexington Avenue Line in New York City
- Bowling Green–Warren County Regional Airport, in Kentucky, U.S.

== Other uses ==
- Bowling Green Bull, an alternate name of Charging Bull, a bronze sculpture in New York City
- Bowling Green Historic District, in Virginia, U.S.
- Bowling Green massacre, a fictional incident referred to by Kellyanne Conway in 2017
