= Bowling Green Township =

Bowling Green Township may refer to:

- Bowling Green Township, Fayette County, Illinois
- Bowling Green Township, Chariton County, Missouri
- Bowling Green Township, Pettis County, Missouri
- Bowling Green Township, Licking County, Ohio
- Bowling Green Township, Marion County, Ohio

== See also ==
- Bowling Green (disambiguation)
