= Pleasant Plateau =

Antarctic ice-free plateau

Pleasant Plateau (79°46′S 158°30′E) is a small, somewhat isolated ice-free plateau located close west of Blank Peaks and Foggydog Glacier in the Brown Hills. Explored by the Victoria University of Wellington Antarctic Expedition (VUWAE), 1962–63, who so named it because of the agreeable weather encountered there on each occasion the area was visited.

== See also ==
- Palisade Valley
