= Bartrum Glacier =

Glacier in Antarctica

- Location within Antarctica
- Type: steeply crevassed
- Location: Brown Hills
- Coordinates: 79°44′S 158°44′E
- Thickness: unknown
- Status: unknown

Bartrum Glacier (79°44′S 158°44′E) is a small steeply crevassed glacier in the Brown Hills, flowing west between Bowling Green Plateau and Blank Peaks. It was mapped by the Victoria University of Wellington Antarctic Expedition (1962–63), and named after J.A. Bartrum (1885–1949), Professor of Geology at the University of Auckland, New Zealand.

== See also ==
- Erewhon Basin
- List of glaciers in the Antarctic
- Glaciology
