= Hammer Hill Park =

Park in Kowloon, Hong Kong

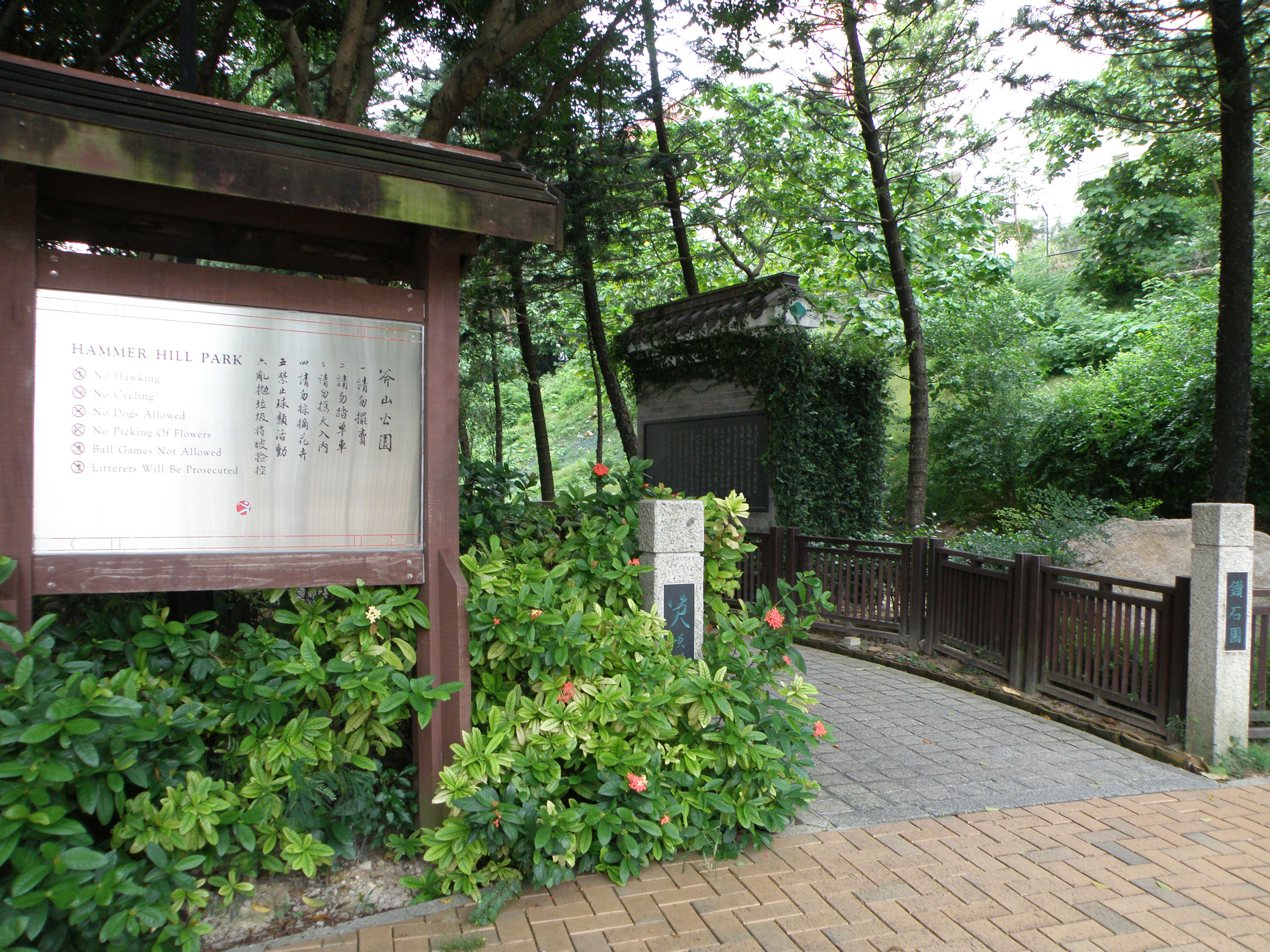
- Signage at one of the park's entrances in September 2014
- Interactive map of Hammer Hill Park
- Location: Kowloon, Hong Kong
- Coordinates: 22.339721°N 114.206214°E

Hammer Hill Park (Chinese: 斧山公園) is a park along Fung Tak Road, near Nan Lian Garden, in Kowloon, Hong Kong.

== History ==
The park was formerly the site of wooden houses. The construction of the first phase and second phase of the park was completed in 2000 and 2006, respectively.
