= Palisade Valley =

Valley in Antarctica

Palisade Valley (79°47′S 158°26′E) is a valley about 2 nautical miles (3.7 km) long and 1,000 m high, dominated for its entire length by a large dolerite sill, situated at the southwest side of Pleasant Plateau and 3 nautical miles (6 km) northeast of Bastion Hill in the Brown Hills. Explored by Victoria University of Wellington Antarctic Expedition (VUWAE), 1962–63, and so named because of resemblance to the Palisades bordering the Hudson River near New York City.
