= Fung Tak Estate =

Public housing estate in Diamond Hill, Hong Kong

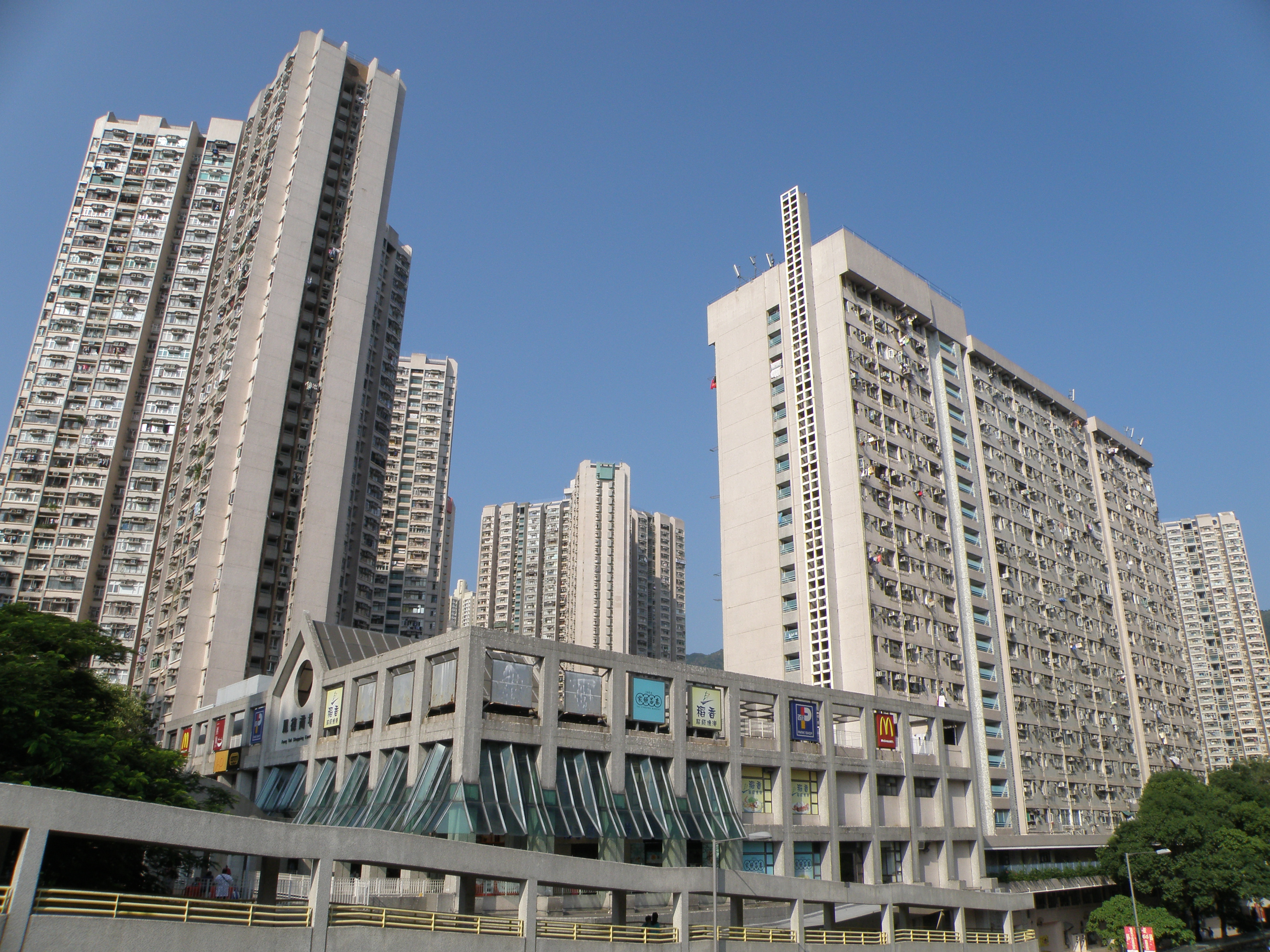
- Fung Tak Estate
- Interactive map of Fung Tak Estate

General information
- Location: 111 Fung Tak Road, Diamond Hill; Kowloon, Hong Kong
- Coordinates: 22.3163°N 114.26923°E
- Status: Completed
- Category: Public rental housing
- Population: 13,342 (2016)
- No. of blocks: 7
- No. of units: 1,659

Construction
- Constructed: 1991; 35 years ago
- Authority: Hong Kong Housing Authority

Fung Tak Estate
- Traditional Chinese: 鳳德邨
- Simplified Chinese: 凤德邨
Transcriptions
Standard Mandarin
- Hanyu Pinyin: Fèng Dé Cūn
Yue: Cantonese
- Jyutping: fung6 dak1 cyun1

Fung Tak Estate (Chinese: 鳳德邨) is a mixed TPS and public housing estate in Diamond Hill, Kowloon, Hong Kong, near Lung Poon Court, Plaza Hollywood, Galaxia and MTR Diamond Hill station. It has seven residential blocks built in 1991 and is named from nearby Fung Tak Road. Some of the flats were sold to tenants through Tenants Purchase Scheme Phase 1 in 1998.

Fung Chuen Court (鳳鑽苑) and Fung Lai Court (鳳禮苑) are Home Ownership Scheme housing courts in Diamond Hill near Fung Tak Estate, built in 1991 and 1997 respectively.

== Houses ==
=== Fung Tak Estate ===
Name	Chinese name	Building type	Completed
Toi Fung House	黛鳳樓	Trident 3	1991
Tsz Fung House	紫鳳樓	Trident 3	1991
Pik Fung House	碧鳳樓	Trident 3	1991
Chu Fung House	硃鳳樓	Trident 3	1991
Suet Fung House	雪鳳樓	Trident 4	1991
Ngan Fung House	銀鳳樓	New Slab	1991
Ban Fung House	斑鳳樓	New Slab	1991

=== Fung Chuen Court ===
Name	Chinese name	Building type	Completed
Fung Chuen Court	鳳鑽苑	Trident	1991

=== Fung Lai Court ===
Name	Chinese name	Building type	Completed
Fung Hei House	鳳禧閣	NCB (Ver.1984)	1997
Fung Yan House	鳳欣閣	NCB (Ver.1984)	1997

== Demographics ==
According to the 2016 by-census, Fung Tak Estate had a population of 13,342. The median age was 49.2 and the majority of residents (98.1 per cent) were of Chinese ethnicity. The average household size was 2.6 people. The median monthly household income of all households (i.e. including both economically active and inactive households) was HK$24,990.

== Politics ==
For the 2019 District Council election, the estate fell within two constituencies. Fung Tak Estate and Fung Lai Court falls within the Fung Tak constituency, which was formerly represented by Cheung Ka-yi until July 2021, while Fung Chuen Court falls within the Lung Sing constituency, which is currently represented by Mandy Tam Heung-man.

== Education ==
Fung Tak Estate is in Primary One Admission (POA) School Net 45. Within the school net are multiple aided schools (operated independently but funded with government money); no government primary schools are in this net.

== See also ==
- Public housing estates in Diamond Hill
