= Fung Tak Road =

Street in Kowloon, Hong Kong

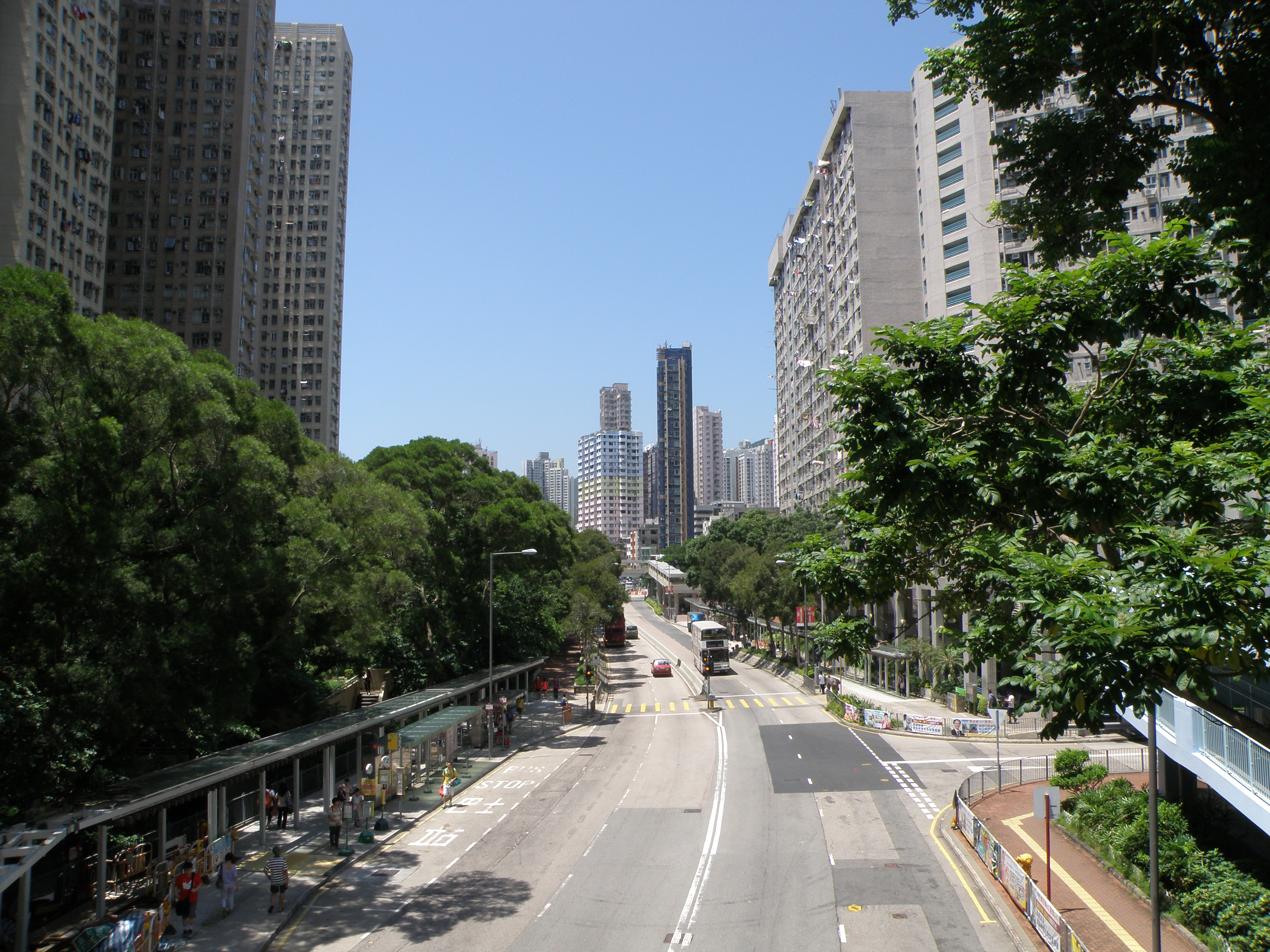
- Interactive map of Fung Tak Road
- Type: Street
- Location: Hong Kong

Fung Tak Road (Chinese: 鳳德道) is a street in Kowloon's Diamond Hill neighbourhood, in Hong Kong. Chi Lin Nunnery, Nan Lian Garden, and Plaza Hollywood are nearby.

== See also ==
- List of streets and roads in Hong Kong
- Public housing estates in Diamond Hill
