= Mount Rich =

Mountain in Oates Land, Antarctica

Mount Rich (79°47′S 158°48′E) is an isolated peak in the Brown Hills, 5 nautical miles (9 km) northwest of Diamond Hill. Named by the Victoria University of Wellington Antarctic Expedition (VUWAE) (1962–63) for Charles C. Rich, United States Antarctic Research Program (USARP) geologist who served as deputy leader and geologist of the expedition.
