= Foggydog Glacier =

Glacier in Antarctica

- Location within Antarctica
- Location: Oates Land
- Coordinates: 79°47′S 158°40′E
- Thickness: unknown
- Status: unknown

Foggydog Glacier is a glacier between the Blank Peaks and Mount Rich in the Brown Hills of Antarctica. It was mapped by the Victoria University of Wellington Antarctic Expedition (1962–63) and so named because in plan the glacier is shaped like the head and neck of a dog, with a moraine suggesting a collar and a glacial lake in the position of the ears. Fog accumulates regularly over the glacier.

== See also ==
- Erewhon Basin
- List of glaciers in the Antarctic
- Glaciology
