= Edward Ayearst Reeves =

British geographer (1862–1945)

Edward Ayearst Reeves FRAS FRGS
- Born: 9 February 1862; Lewes, England
- Died: 17 October 1945 (aged 83); Reigate, England
- Monuments: Mount Reeves; Reeves Bluffs; Reeves Plateau
- Spouse: Grace Eden Harley (m. 1888)
- Children: 2, including Alec
- Awards: Cullum Geographical Medal (1922); Victoria Medal (1928)
- Honours: Fellow of the Royal Astronomical Society (1896); Fellow of the Royal Geographical Society (1900)

Edward Ayearst Reeves (9 February 1862 – 17 October 1945) was a British geographer, astronomer, and cartographer. He was a Fellow of the Royal Astronomical Society beginning in 1896, a Fellow of the Royal Geographical Society from 1900, and won the 1922 Cullum Geographical Medal and 1928 Victoria Medal.

Born on 9 February 1862 in Lewes, Reeves became a junior assistant in the Royal Geographical Society's map room of the at age 16, becoming a map curator in 1900. Beginning in 1901, he worked as an instructor of both astronomy and surveying; in 1904, he was promoted to superintendent of the map drawing department. He retired in 1933.

Reeves was an author of multiple written works, notably including editing multiple editions of Hints to Travellers, as well as authoring Trigonometry, Plane and Spherical (1904), Maps and Map-making (1910), and The Recollections of a Geographer (1935).

Reeves married Grace Eden Harley in 1888. He died in his Reigate home on 17 October 1945, leaving his widow, a son (Alec Reeves), and a daughter (Dorothy).
