= Relief (disambiguation) =

A relief is a sculpture where a modelled form projects from a flat background.

Relief may also refer to:

== Other common meanings ==
- Relief (emotion)
- Relief (military)
- Relief (humanitarian)

== Places ==
=== Antarctica ===
- Relief Inlet, Victoria Land
- Relief Pass, a mountain pass in Oates Land

=== United States ===
- Relief, California, an unincorporated community
- Relief, Kentucky, an unincorporated community
- Relief, North Carolina, an unincorporated community
- Relief, Ohio, an unincorporated community
- Relief, Washington, a community

== Arts, entertainment, and media ==
=== Music ===
- Relief (music), the curvature of the neck of a guitar or similar instrument allowing the strings to vibrate freely
- Relief (Kevin Drumm album), 2012
- Relief (Mike Stud album), 2013
- Relief, 1998 album by Pope Jane
- Relief, 2010 album by Finnish band Magenta Skycode
- "Relief", a song by American band Cold War Kids from the 2008 album Loyalty to Loyalty
- "Relief", a song by Moka Only and Chief from the 2011 album Crickets

=== Other arts, entertainment, and media ===
- RelieF, a Canadian news television series
- "Relief" (Juliet Bravo), a 1980 television episode
- Relief pitcher, a baseball or softball position
- Bas relief, a projecting image with a shallow overall depth

== Ships ==
- Relief (sternwheeler), a steamboat that operated on the Willamette River, in Oregon, U.S., in the mid-1800s
- United States lightship Relief (WAL-605), a former Coast Guard lightship launched in 1950 and out of service in 1976
- USS Relief, several U.S. Navy ships

== Terrain ==
- Relief generation, a set of landforms
- Topographic relief, the variation in elevation of a landscape
- Shaded relief in terrain cartography

== Other uses ==
- Relief (feature selection), a feature selection algorithm
- Relief valve, a safety valve designed to open in overpressurized system conditions
- Debt relief, the partial or total "lifting-back" or forgiveness of debt
- Feudal relief, a payment to an overlord by the heir of a feudal tenant to license him to take possession of his inheritance
- Judicial relief, or legal remedy
- Optical relief, a concept in optical mineralogy
- Poor relief, historical name, prior to the era of the welfare state, for official methods of poverty alleviation
- Quasar Relief, a Czech competition hang glider design
