= Erewhon (disambiguation) =

Erewhon is a novel by Samuel Butler.

Erewhon may also refer to:

- Erewhon (album), a 1996 album by David Thomas and Two Pale Boys
- Erewhon Basin, an ice-free area in Antarctica
- Erewhon (store), an American upscale grocery chain
- Erewhon Organic, an organic cereal brand and subsidiary of Post Foods discontinued in 2019
- Erewhon, a place by the Rangitata River of New Zealand near the spot used for Edoras in Peter Jackson's film of The Two Towers
