= Gatson =

Gatson is a surname. Notable people called Gatson include:

- Brandon Gatson (born 1984), American professional wrestler
- Gregory Gatson (born 1989), American professional footballer
- Jason Gatson (born 1980), American gymnast
- Rico Gatson (born 1966), American multidisciplinary artist
- Frank Gatson Jr., American director and choreographer

== See also ==
- Daisy Gatson Bates (1914–1999), American civil rights activist, journalist and lecturer
- Gatson Ridge, jagged ridge in the Brown Hills of the Cook Mountains, Antarctica
