= Relief map =

Relief map or mapping may refer to:

- Raised-relief map, a 3D physical representation of terrain
- Relief mapping (computer graphics), the 3D digital rendering of texture, which may simulate shadows
- Topographic map, a 2D depiction of terrestrial relief, using terrain cartography

== See also ==
- Relief (disambiguation)
