= Nan Lian Garden =

Garden in Diamond Hill, Hong Kong

Coordinates: 22.339093°N 114.204774°E

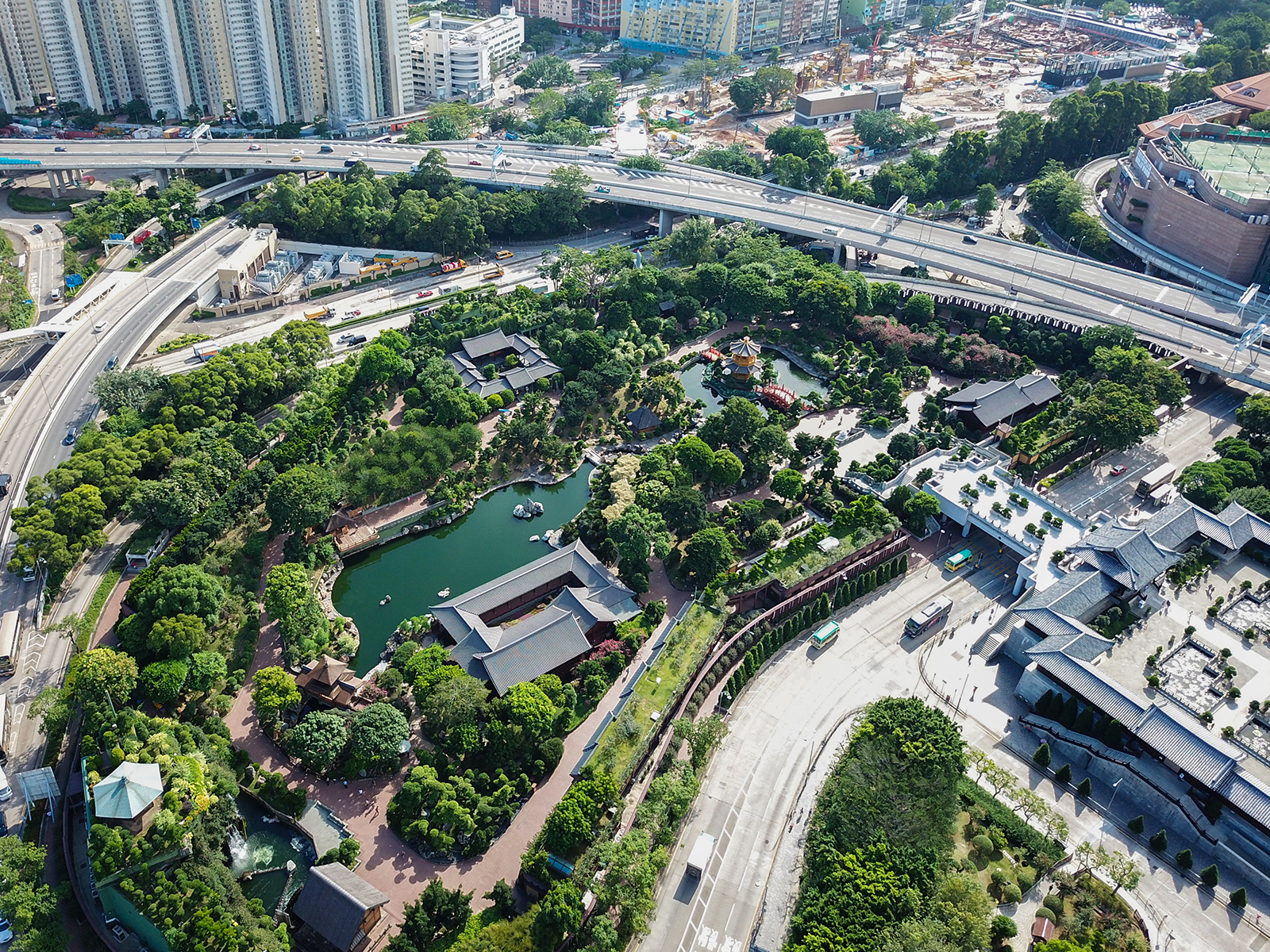
- Aerial view of Nan Lian Garden
- Traditional Chinese: 南蓮園池
- Simplified Chinese: 南莲园池
Transcriptions
Standard Mandarin
- Hanyu Pinyin: Nánlián Yuánchí
Yue: Cantonese
- Jyutping: naam4 lin4 jyun4 ci4

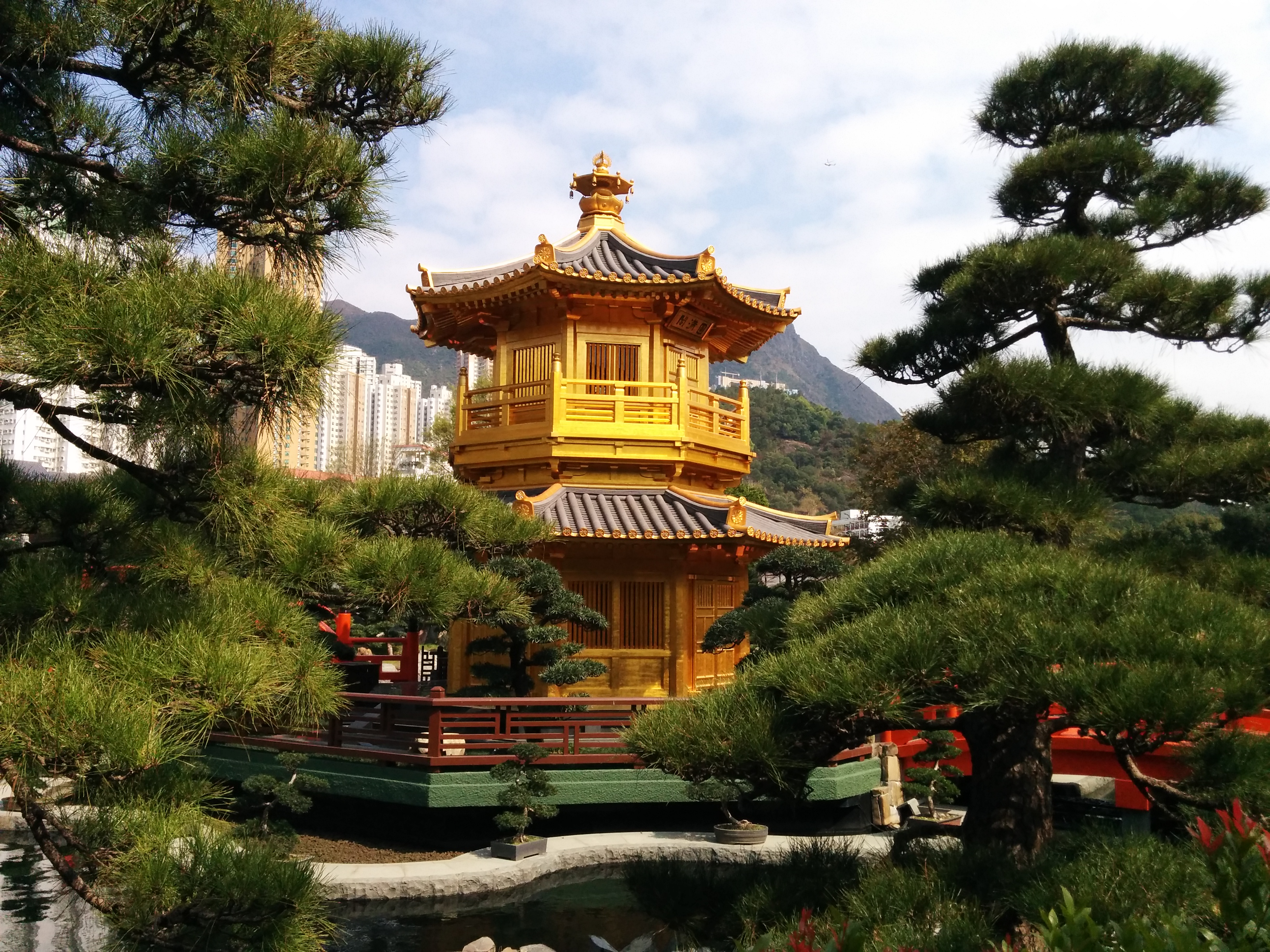
Pavilion of Absolute Perfection

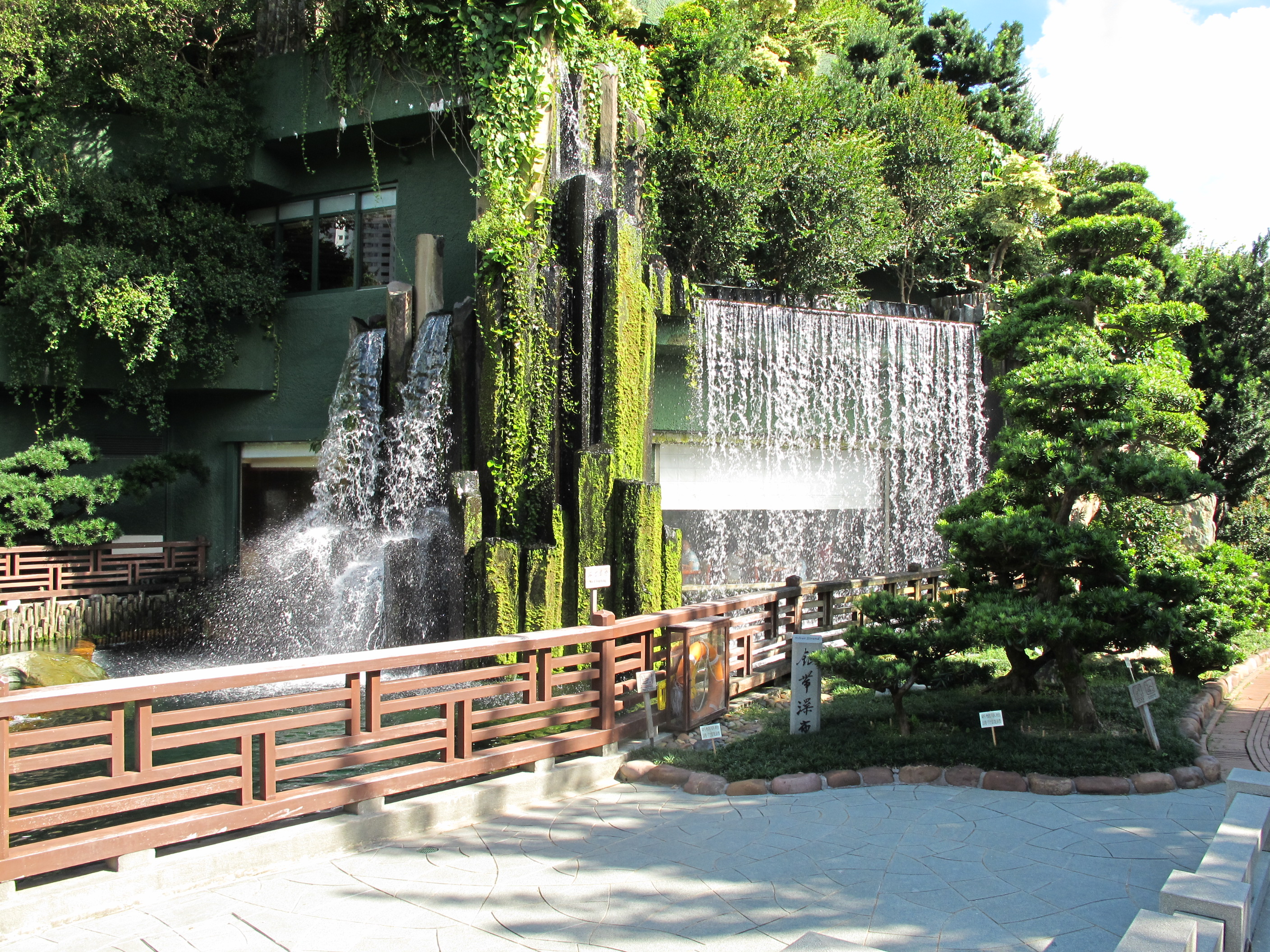
Long Man Lou waterfall

The Nan Lian Garden (Chinese: 南蓮園池; Cantonese Yale: nàamlìn yún chì) is a Chinese classical garden in Diamond Hill, Hong Kong near Diamond Hill station. The garden has an area of 3.5 hectares (8.6 acres). It is designed in Tang dynasty style with hills, water features, trees, rocks, and wooden structures.

The garden was a joint project of the Chi Lin Nunnery and the Hong Kong Government. It opened to the public on 14 November 2006.

The garden is open daily from 7am to 9pm.

== Gallery ==
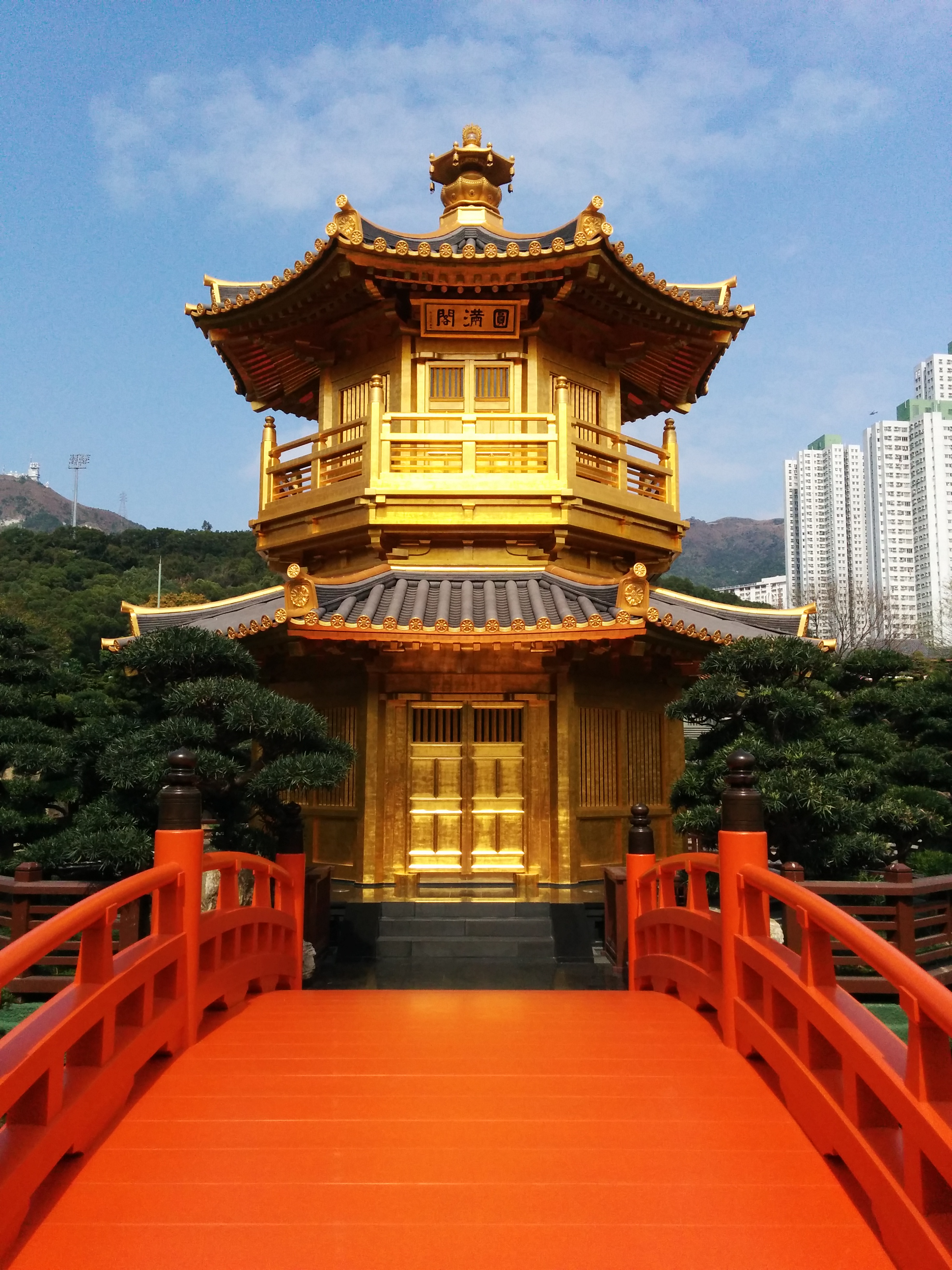
Nan Lian Garden Pavilion of Absolute Perfection

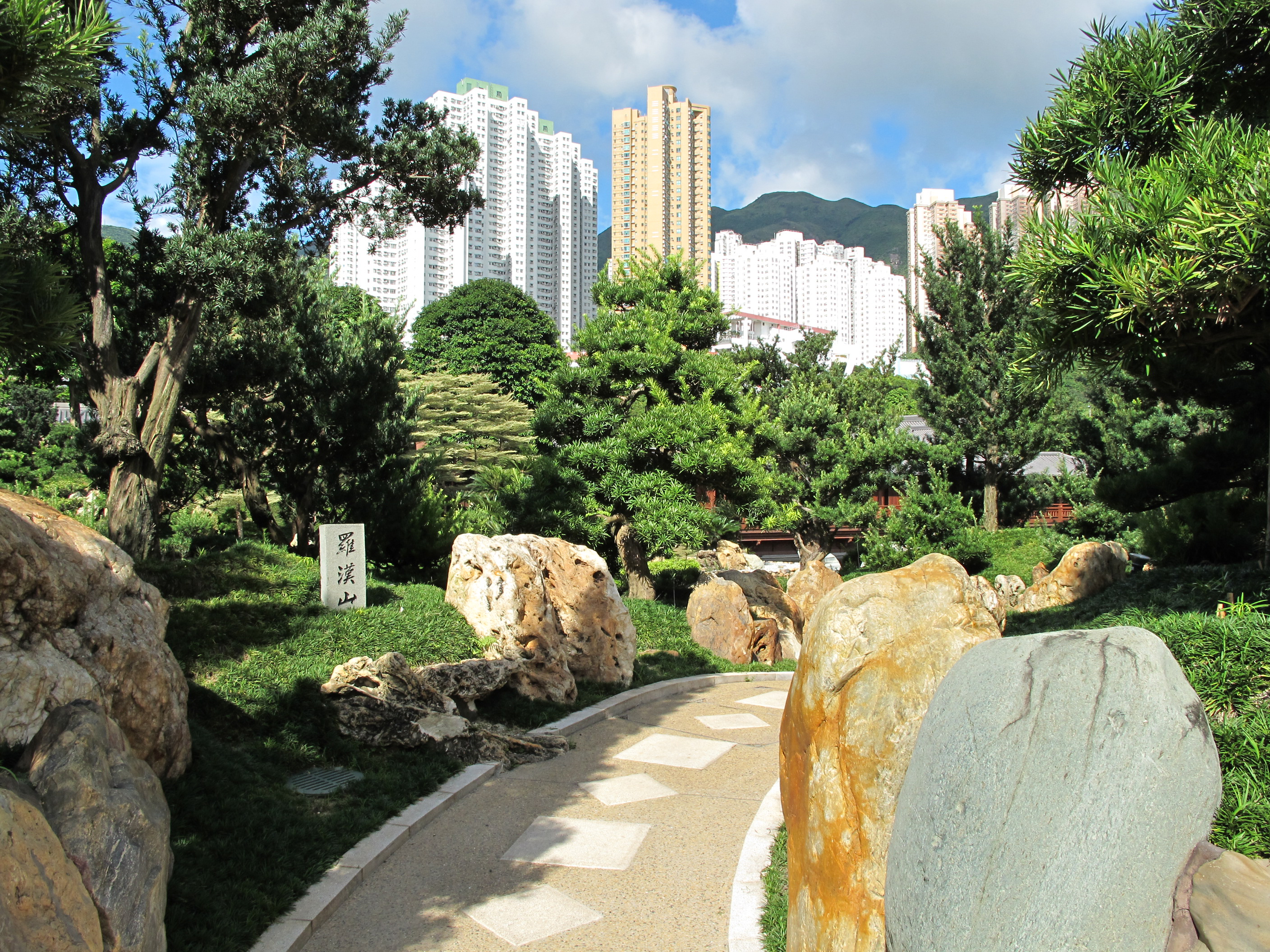
Lo Hang Shan

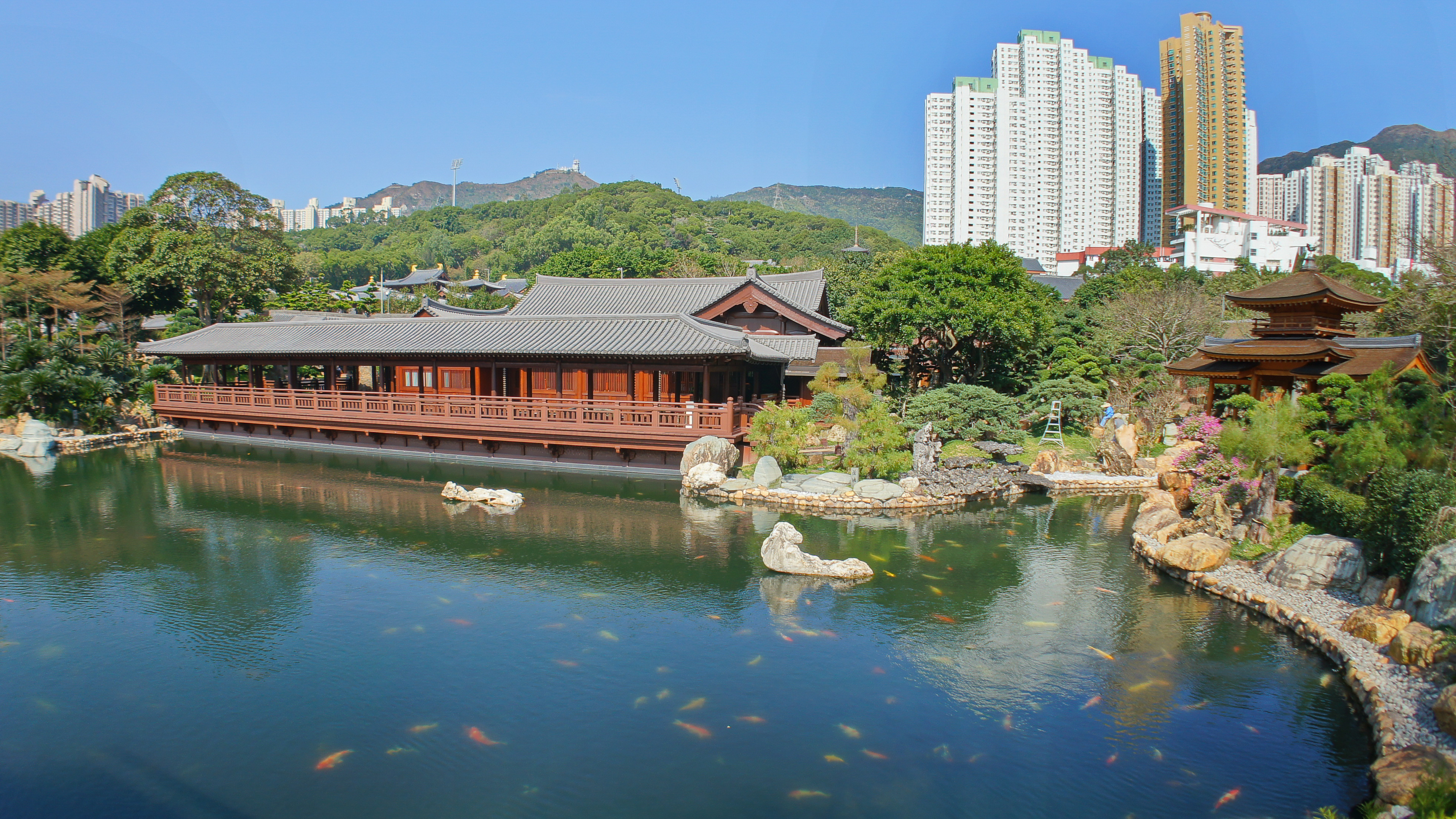
Blue Pond

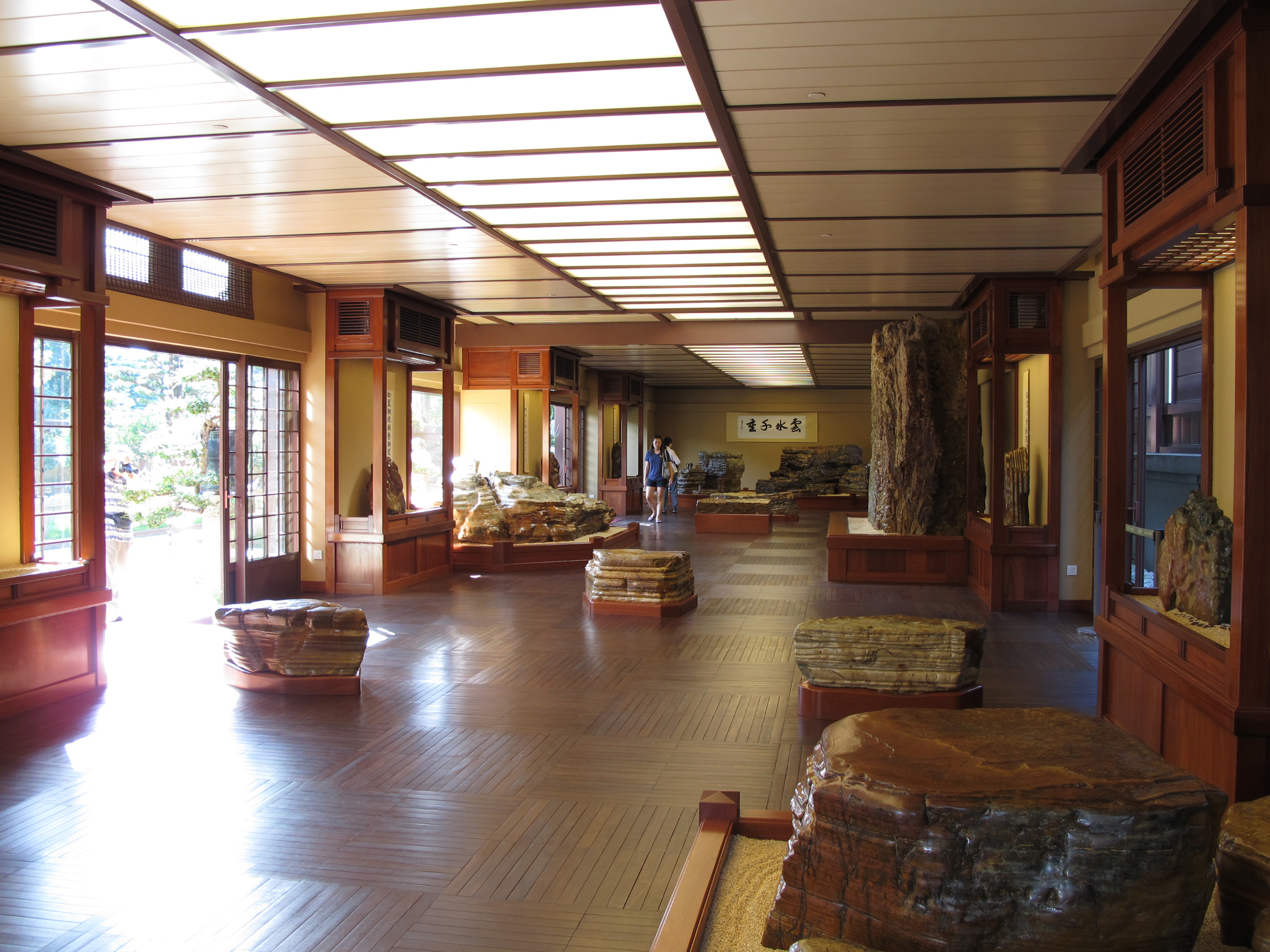
The Rockery

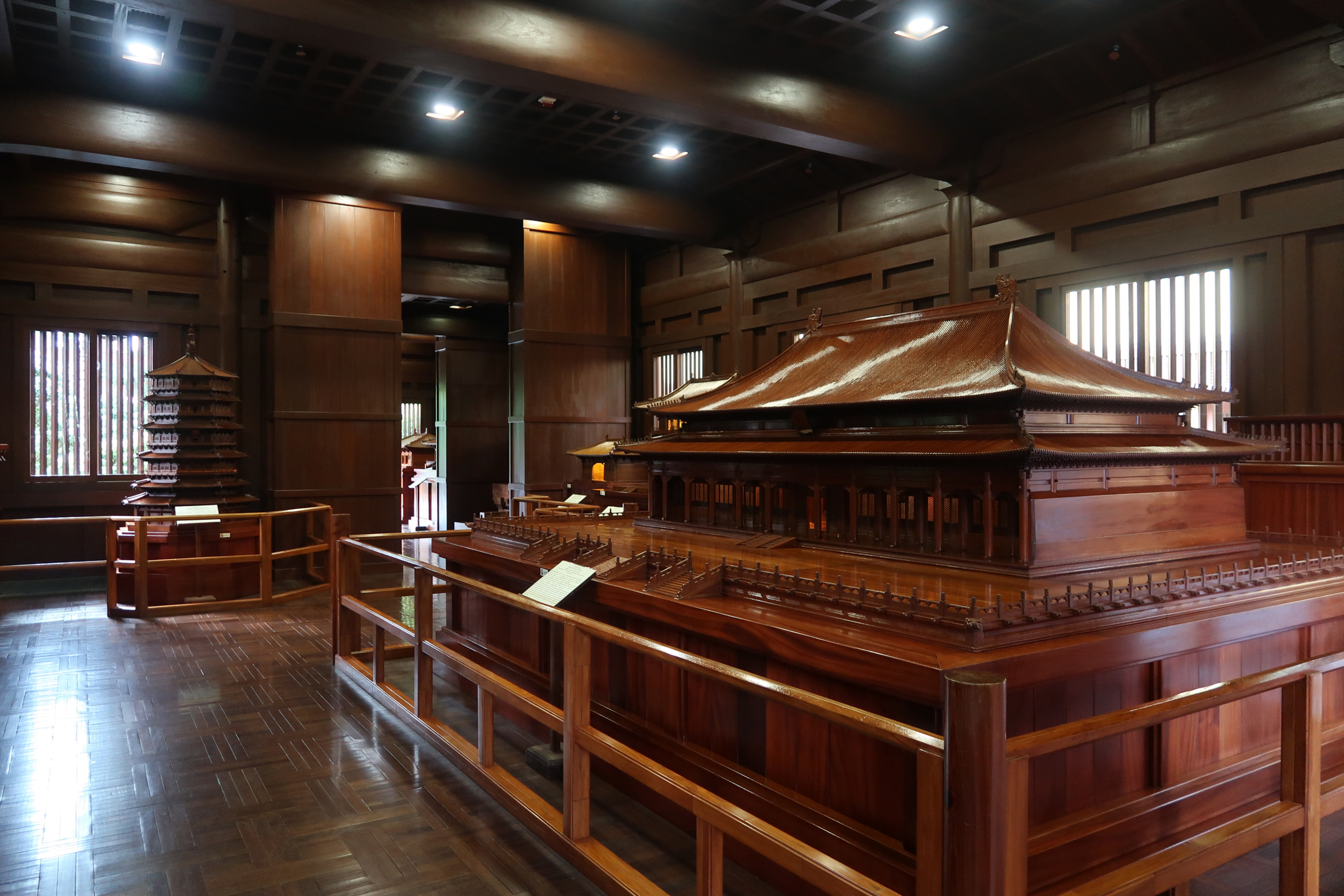
Chinese Timber Architecture Gallery
