= Public housing estates in Diamond Hill =

Public housing in Diamond Hill, Hong Kong

The following shows the public housing estates in Diamond Hill, Wong Tai Sin District, Kowloon, Hong Kong.

== Overview ==
Name		Type	Inaug.	No Blocks	No Units	Notes
Fung Tak Estate	鳳德邨	TPS	1991	7	1,659	
Fung Chuen Court	鳳鑽苑	HOS	1991	1	612	
Fung Lai Court	鳳禮苑	HOS	1997	2	690	
Lung Poon Court	龍蟠苑	HOS	1987	7	3,680	
Kai Chuen Court	啟鑽苑	Public	2021	2	1,018	

=== Fung Chuen Court ===
Fung Chuen Court (Chinese: 鳳鑽苑) is a Home Ownership Scheme court in Diamond Hill, near Fung Tak Estate. It has one block built in 1991.

Name	Type	Completion
Fung Chuen Court	Trident	1991

=== Fung Lai Court ===
Fung Lai Court (Chinese: 鳳禮苑) is a Home Ownership Scheme court in Diamond Hill, near Fung Tak Estate. It has two blocks built in 1997.

Name	Type	Completion
Fung Hei House	NCB (Ver.1984)	1997
Fung Yan House	NCB (Ver.1984)	1997

=== Fung Tak Estate ===
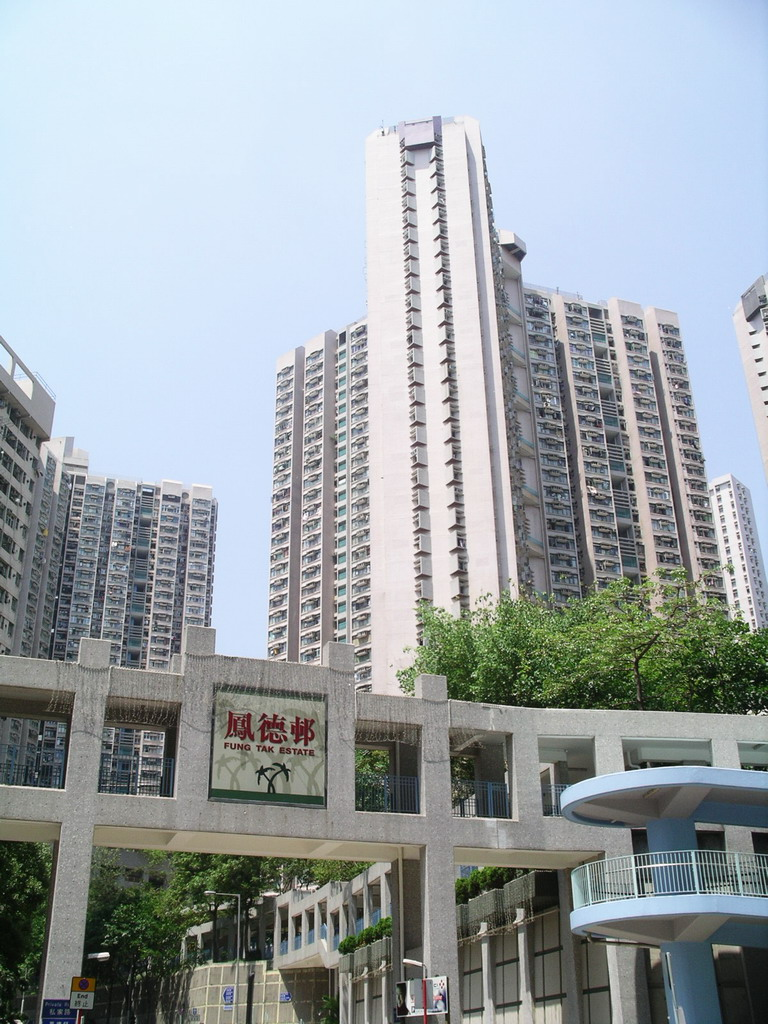
Fung Tak Estate

Fung Tak Estate (Chinese: 鳳德邨) is a public housing estate and Tenants Purchase Scheme estate in Diamond Hill, near Lung Poon Court, Plaza Hollywood, Galaxia and MTR Diamond Hill station. It has 7 blocks built in 1991. It is named from nearby Fung Tak Road. In 1998, some of the flats were sold to tenants through Tenants Purchase Scheme Phase 1.

Name	Type	Completion
Toi Fung House	Trident 3	1991
Tsz Fung House	Trident 3	1991
Pik Fung House	Trident 3	1991
Chu Fung House	Trident 3	1991
Suet Fung House	Trident 4	1991
Ngan Fung House	New Slab	1991
Ban Fung House	New Slab	1991

== Education ==
Lung Poon Court is in Primary One Admission (POA) School Net 45. Within the school net are multiple aided schools (operated independently but funded with government money); no government primary schools are in this net.

== See also ==
- List of public housing estates in Hong Kong
