= Erewhon Basin =

Ice-free area in Antarctica

Erewhon Basin (79°48′S 158°34′E) is an extensive ice-free area in Antarctica. It forms a basin in the Brown Hills separating the snouts of Foggydog Glacier and Bartrum Glacier from the northern edge of the Darwin Glacier. It was explored by the Victoria University of Wellington Antarctic Expedition), 1962–63, and named from Samuel Butler's novel Erewhon.
