= Mount Reeves =

Mountain in Graham Land, Antarctica

Mount Reeves (67°7′S 67°58′W) is a mountain, 1,920m, immediately northeast of Mount Bouvier on the east side of Adelaide Island. First sighted and roughly surveyed in 1909 by the French Antarctic Expedition under Charcot. Resurveyed in 1948 by the Falkland Islands Dependencies Survey (FIDS) and named by them for Edward A. Reeves, Map-curator and Instructor in Survey at the Royal Geographical Society, 1900–33.
