= Bastion Hill =

Bastion Hill (79°50′S 158°19′E) is a prominent ice-free feature in the Brown Hills of Antarctica, rising to 1,490 metres (4,900 ft) and projecting southward into Darwin Glacier just east of Touchdown Glacier. The descriptive name, the hill supposedly suggesting a bastion, was given by the Darwin Glacier Party of the Commonwealth Trans-Antarctic Expedition (1956–58).

== Localities ==
- Relief Pass
