= Gatson Ridge =

Jagged ridge in Antarctica

Gatson Ridge (79°43′S 158°51′E) is a jagged ridge, 3 nautical miles (6 km) long with an elevation of 1158m. It runs east from the southern part of Bowling Green Plateau in the Brown Hills of the Cook Mountains, Antarctica. It was named by the Advisory Committee on Antarctic Names after Karl W. Gatson of the United States Geological Survey (USGS), a topographic engineer on the joint 1975–76 USGS – British Antarctic Survey project to establish control points for Landsat mosaics of Palmer Land, and to establish geodetically tied independent survey nets in the Ellsworth Mountains and Antarctic Peninsula into a worldwide reference system using Doppler satellite control.
