= Bowling Green Col =

Bowling Green Col (79°40′S 158°35′E) is an ice-filled east–west col between Reeves Plateau and Bowling Green Plateau in the Cook Mountains of Antarctica. It was named by the Advisory Committee on Antarctic Names in association with Bowling Green Plateau.
