= Wright Hill =

Wright Hill (79°42′S 158°46′E) is a large flat-topped hill at the east side of Bowling Green Plateau in the Cook Mountains. Mapped by the Darwin Glacier Party of the Commonwealth Trans-Antarctic Expedition (1956–58). Named after D. Wright, a member of the Commonwealth Trans-Antarctic Expedition who accompanied Sir Edmund Hillary to the South Pole.
