= Relief Pass =

Relief Pass (79°49′S 158°23′E) is a pass, about 1,000 m high, situated 1 nautical mile (1.9 km) north of Bastion Hill in the Brown Hills. Explored by the Victoria University of Wellington Antarctic Expedition (VUWAE), 1962–63, and so named by its members because of the relief it provided after ascent to this pass.
