= Bowling Green High School =

Bowling Green High School may refer to:

- Bowling Green High School (Kentucky)
- Bowling Green High School (Missouri), in Bowling Green, Missouri
- Bowling Green High School (Ohio)
