= USS Relief =

USS Relief may refer to the following ships of the United States Navy:

- USS Relief (1836), a store ship launched in 1836 and sold in 1883
- USS Relief (1896), a hospital ship commissioned in 1909 and sold in 1919
- USS Relief (YP-2), purchased in 1917 and used as a lookout station tender in Maine; sold in 1921
- USS Relief (ID-2170), a salvage tug, in commission from 1918 to 1919
- USS Relief (1904), a lightship built in 1904 and out of service in the 1920s
- USS Relief (AH-1), a hospital ship commissioned in 1920 and decommissioned in 1946

== See also ==
- United States lightship Relief (WAL-605), a former United States Coast Guard lightship launched in 1950 and out of service in 1976, now a museum ship
