= Bowling Green, Pennsylvania =

Unincorporated community in Pennsylvania, US

- Unincorporated community
- Location within Pennsylvania
- Coordinates: 39°55′9″N 75°22′50″W
- Country: United States
- State: Pennsylvania
- County: Delaware
- Township: Nether Providence
- Elevation: 318 ft (97 m)
- Time zone: UTC-5 (Eastern (EST))
  - Summer (DST): UTC-4 (EDT)
- Area codes: 610 and 484
- GNIS feature ID: 1170060

Bowling Green is an unincorporated community predominantly located in Nether Providence Township in Delaware County, Pennsylvania, United States. However, parts are also located in Upper Providence Township and Media. Bowling Green is located in the northwestern corner of the township, east of Media.
