= Bowling Green, Worcestershire =

Coordinates: 52.156979°N 2.270694°W

Bowling Green
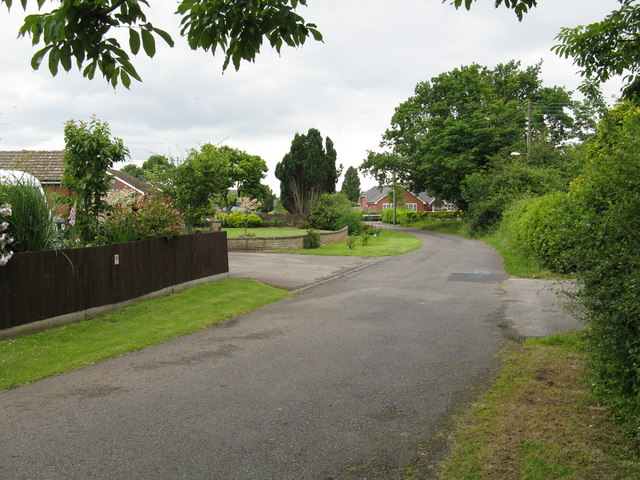
- Bowling Green Road

- Location within Worcestershire
- OS grid reference: SO815510
  - London: 103 miles (166 km)
- Civil parish: Powick
- District: Malvern Hills
- Shire county: Worcestershire
- Region: West Midlands
- Country: England
- Sovereign state: United Kingdom
- Post town: WORCESTER
- Postcode district: WR2
- Dialling code: 01905
- Police: West Mercia
- Fire: Hereford and Worcester
- Ambulance: West Midlands

Bowling Green is a village in Powick civil parish, Worcestershire, England. In 2021, the parish of Powick recorded a population of 3,463.
