= Reeves Plateau =

Reeves Plateau (79°35′S 158°35′E) is an inclined ice-covered plateau, 8 nautical miles (15 km) long and 4 nautical miles (7.4 km) wide, located north of Bowling Green Plateau and west of Reeves Bluffs in the Cook Mountains. The feature rises to 1700 m in the east near Reeves Bluffs and descends to 1400 m in the west. The plateau was named by the Advisory Committee on Antarctic Names (US-ACAN), in association with Reeves Bluffs.
