= Blank Peaks =

Mountains in Antarctica

Coordinates: 79°46′S 158°42′E

Blank Peaks is a cluster of ice-free peaks occupying the isolated ridge between Bartrum and Foggydog Glaciers in the Brown Hills of Antarctica.

Mapped by the VUWAE (1960–61) and named for H. Richard Blank, geologist with the expedition.
