= Diamond Hill station =

MTR station in Kowloon, Hong Kong

Diamond Hill 鑽石山
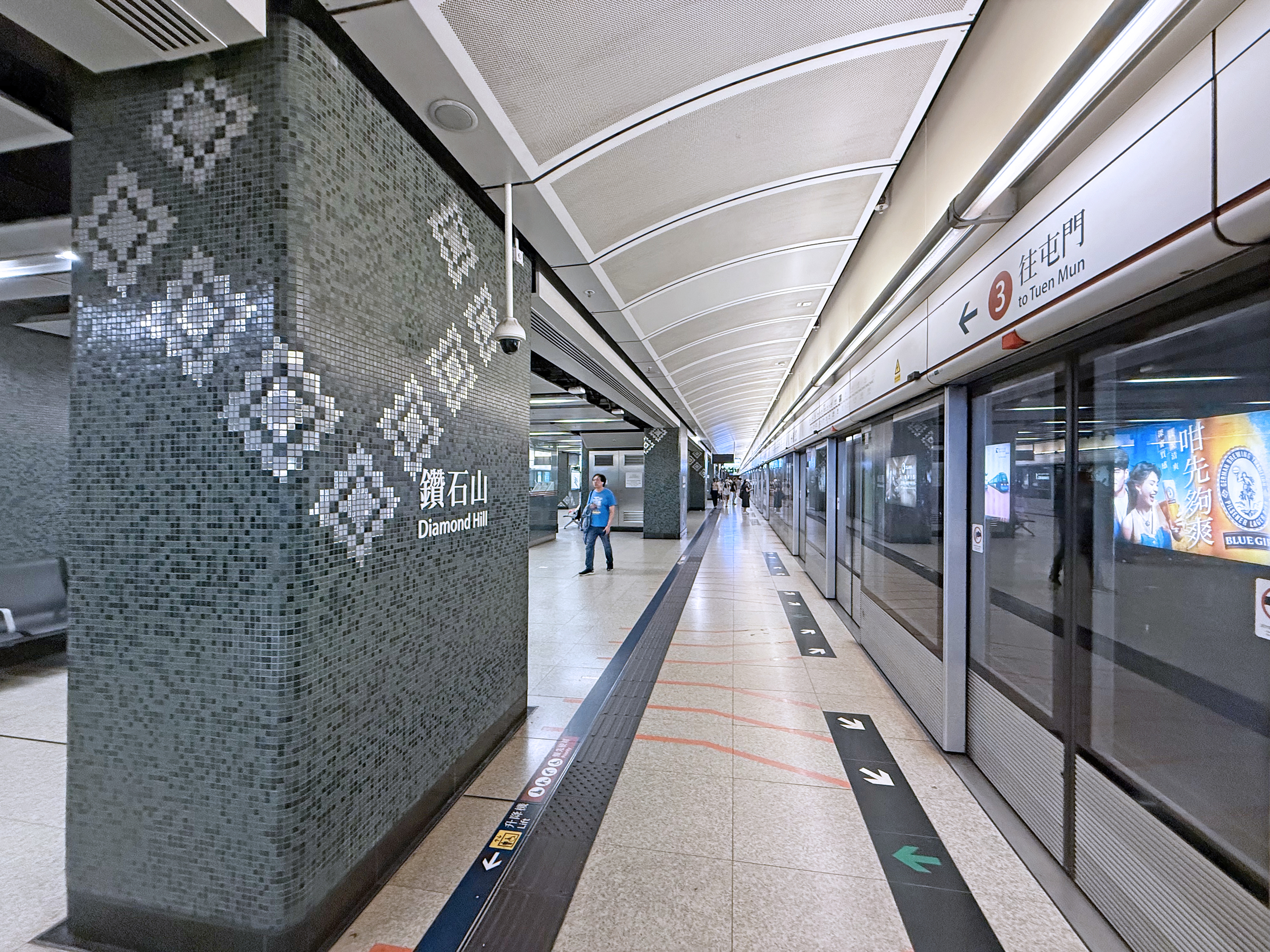
- Platform 3

Chinese name
- Traditional Chinese: 鑽石山
- Simplified Chinese: 钻石山
- Jyutping: Zyun3 sek6 saan1
- Hanyu Pinyin: Zuànshí shān
- Literal meaning: Drill Stone Mountain
Transcriptions
Standard Mandarin
- Hanyu Pinyin: Zuànshí shān
Yue: Cantonese
- Yale Romanization: Jyun sehk sāan
- IPA: [tsyn˧sɛk̚˨san˥]
- Jyutping: Zyun3 sek6 saan1

General information
- Location: Lung Cheung Road × Tai Hom Road, Tai Hom; Wong Tai Sin District, Hong Kong
- Coordinates: 22°20′24″N 114°12′06″E
- System: MTR rapid transit station
- Owner: Tuen Ma line: KCR Corporation; Kwun Tong line: MTR Corporation
- Operator: MTR Corporation
- Lines: Kwun Tong line; Tuen Ma line
- Platforms: 4 (2 island platforms)
- Tracks: 4
- Connections: Bus, minibus

Construction
- Structure type: Underground
- Platform levels: 2
- Accessible: yes

Other information
- Station code: DIH

History
- Opened: Kwun Tong line : 1 October 1979; 46 years ago; Tuen Ma line : 14 February 2020; 6 years ago
- Electrified: Kwun Tong line : 1.5 kV DC (Overhead line); Tuen Ma line : 25 kV 50 Hz AC (Overhead line)

Services
Preceding station	MTR	Following station
Wong Tai Sin towards Whampoa	Kwun Tong line	Choi Hung towards Tiu Keng Leng
Kai Tak towards Tuen Mun	Tuen Ma line	Hin Keng towards Wu Kai Sha
Track layout
Upper platforms
Lower platforms
Location
- Location within MTR

Diamond Hill (Chinese: 鑽石山; Cantonese Yale: Jyun sehk sāan) is an MTR station located in Tai Hom, Northern Kowloon, named for local Diamond Hill area. It is an interchange station on the Kwun Tong line and Tuen Ma line. The station is incorporated into the Plaza Hollywood shopping mall.

== Station layout ==
The Tuen Ma line platforms are located below those of the Kwun Tong line; the station was expanded to include those platforms and an extended concourse as part of the Sha Tin to Central Link project.

Space was reserved for the platforms of the East Kowloon line when this station was built in the 1970s. This can be seen behind the advertising panels on the Kwun Tong line platforms. The spaces for the reserved platforms are little more than untrimmed rock formations behind the advertising panels.

G	Ground level	Exits
L2	Concourse	Customer service, MTRshops, vending machines
L2	Concourse	Hang Seng Bank, automatic teller machines
L3; Upper Platforms	Platform 1	Kwun Tong line towards Tiu Keng Leng (Choi Hung) →
L3; Upper Platforms	Island platform, doors will open on the right
L3; Upper Platforms	Platform 2	← Kwun Tong line towards Whampoa (Wong Tai Sin)
L5; Lower Platforms	Platform 4	← Tuen Ma line towards Wu Kai Sha (Hin Keng)
L5; Lower Platforms	Island platform, doors will open on the left
L5; Lower Platforms	Platform 3	Tuen Ma line towards Tuen Mun (Kai Tak) →

== Livery ==
This station's livery is greyish black with silver stones symbolising diamonds.

== History ==
Diamond Hill station opened as part of the Kwun Tong line on 1 October 1979. The Tuen Ma line platforms became operational on 14 February 2020. The station was built by Paul Y. Construction (now Paul Y. Engineering) under Contract 207.

== Entrances/exits ==
- A1: Lung Poon Court, Fung Tak Estate
- A2: San Po Kong
- B: Rhythm Garden
- C1: Tai Hom Road
- C2: Plaza Hollywood
- D: Kai Chuen Court / Shopping Centre

== Gallery ==
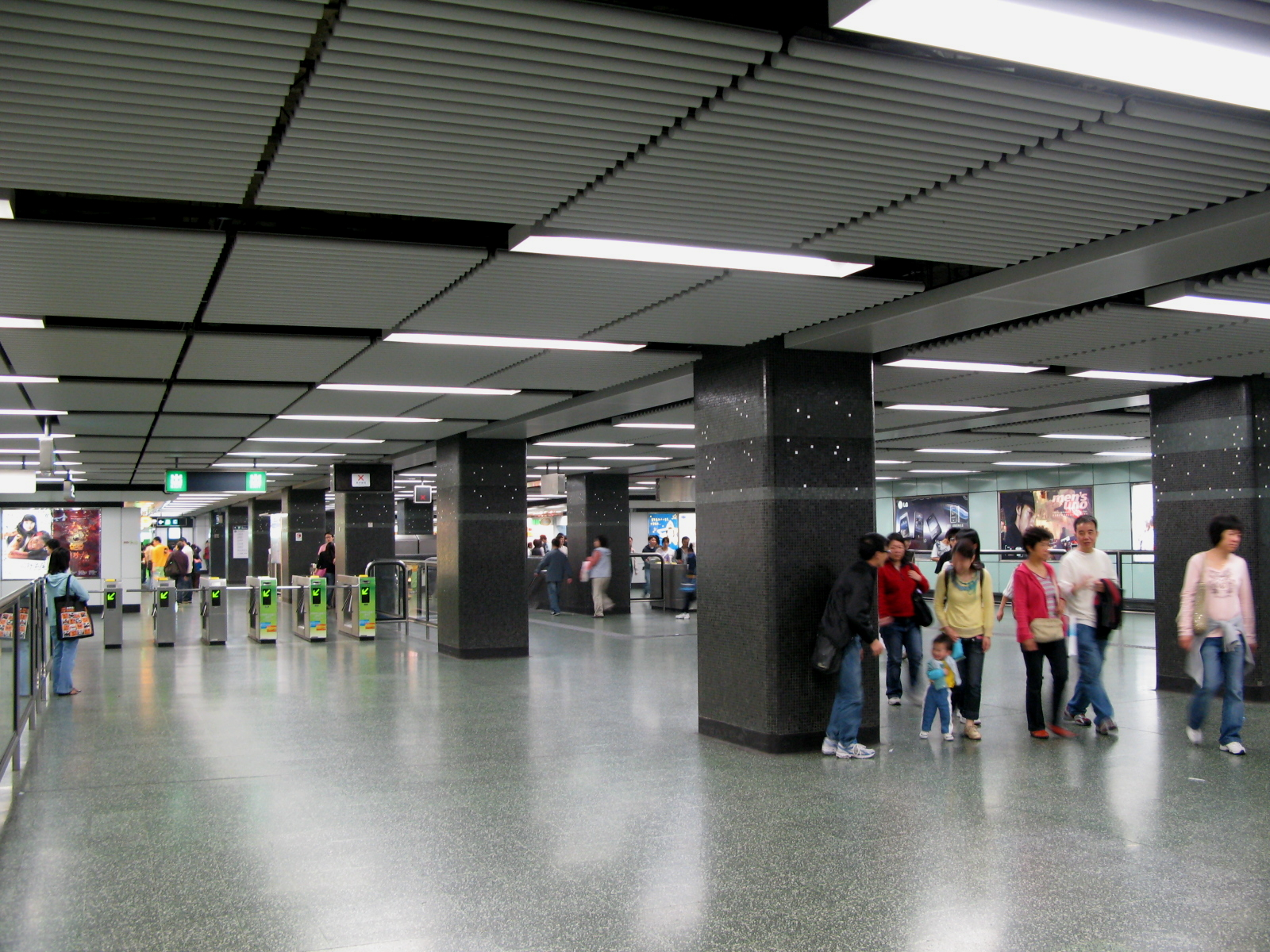
Kwun Tong line Concourse

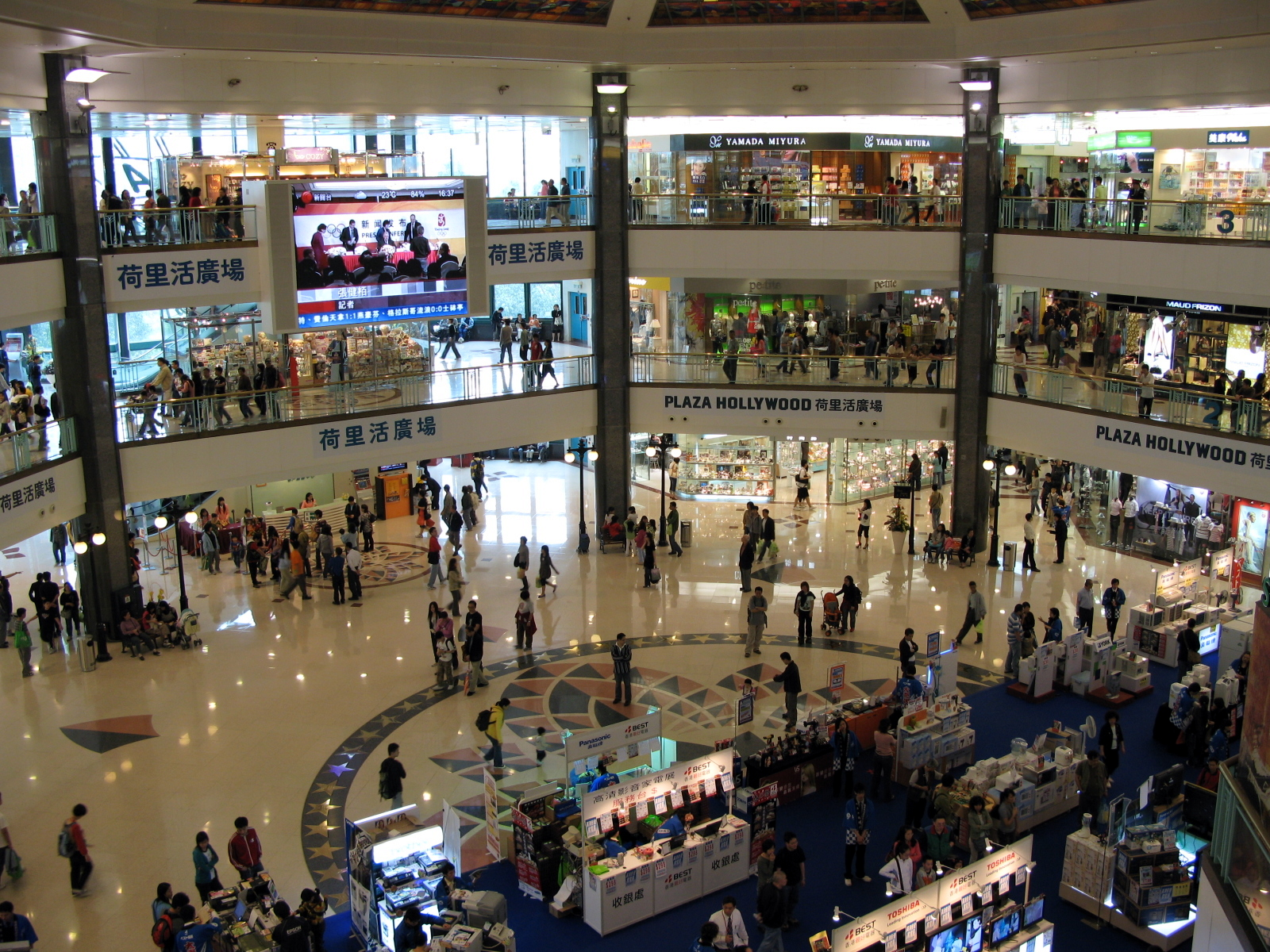
Plaza Hollywood

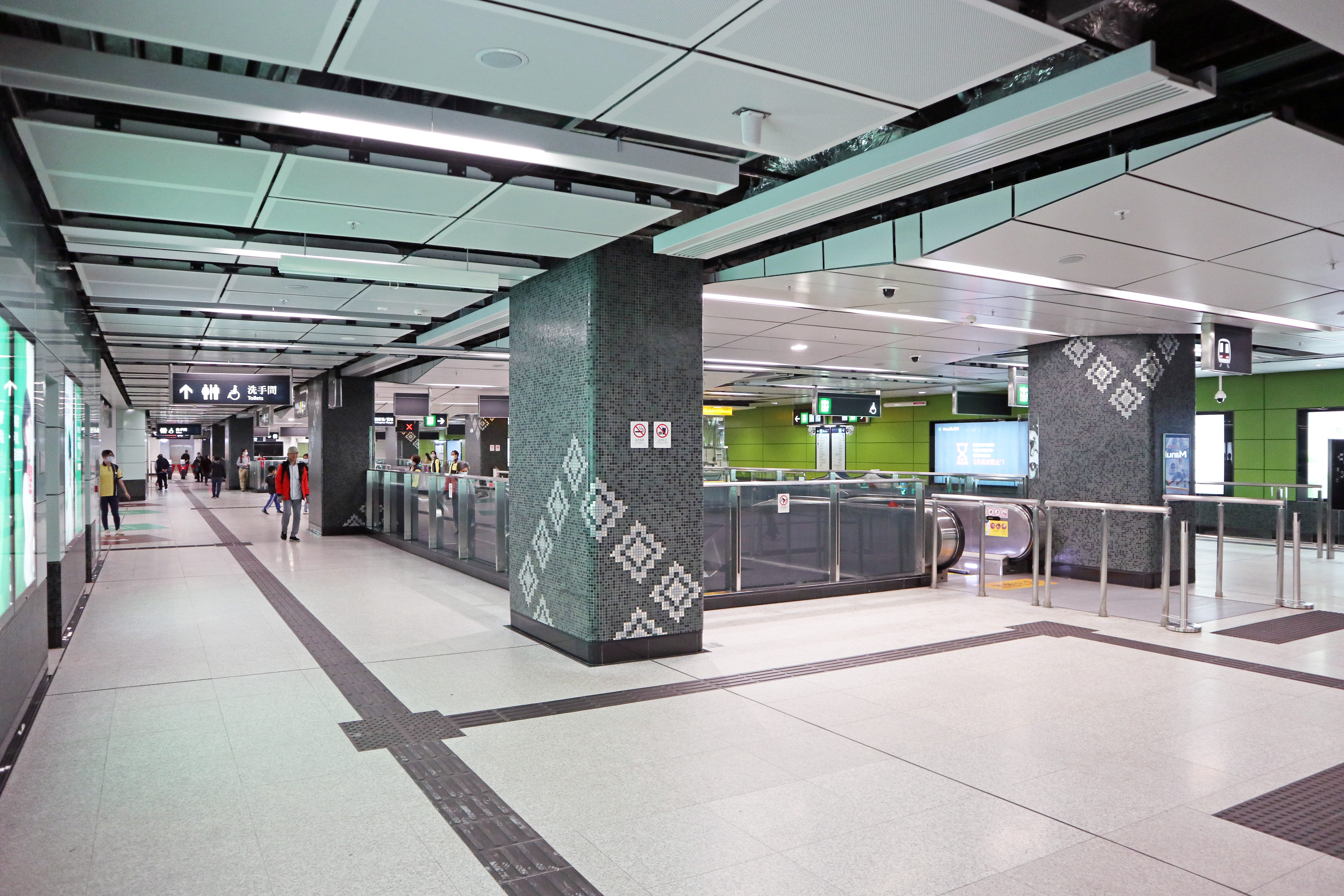
Tuen Ma Line Concourse

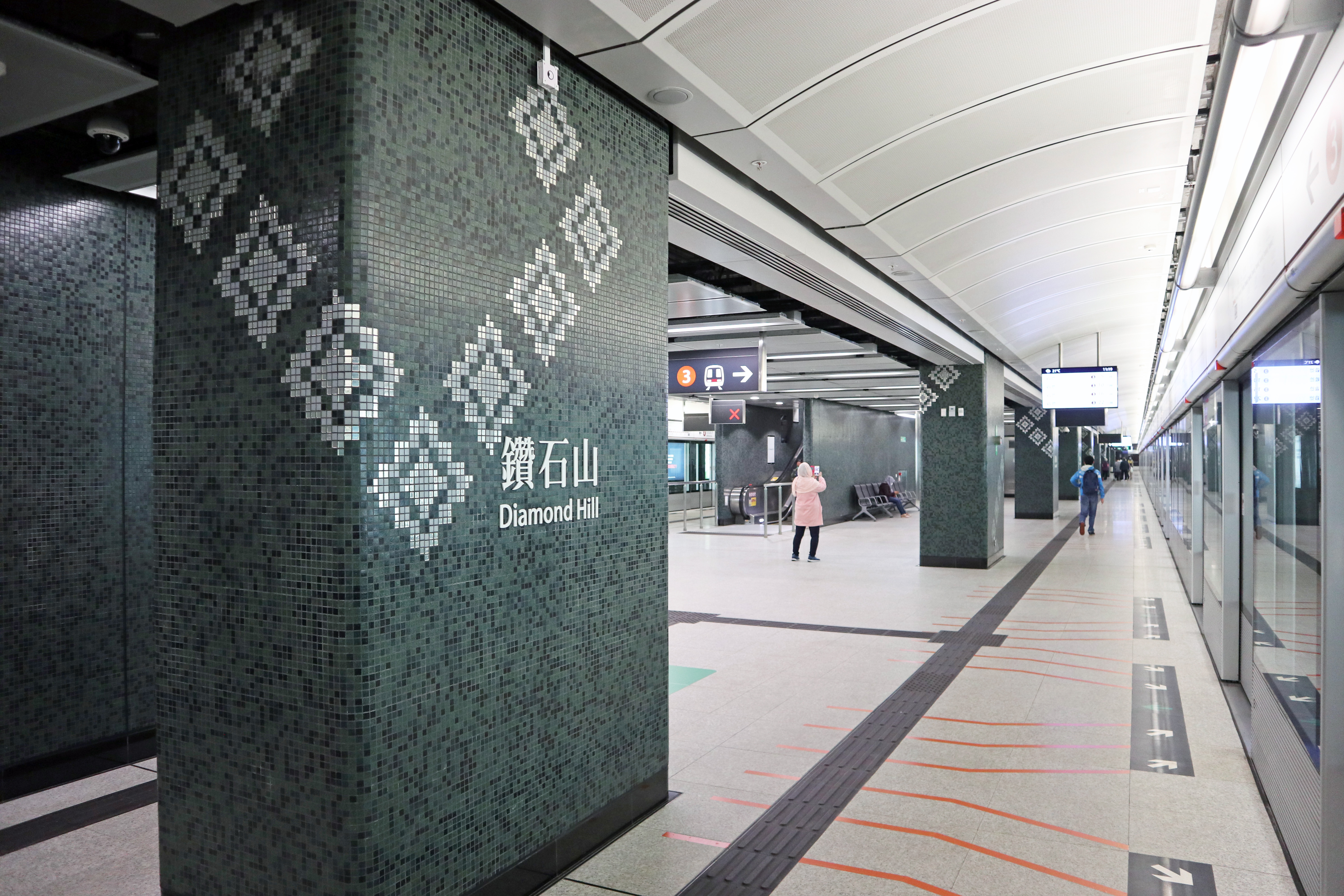
Platform 3

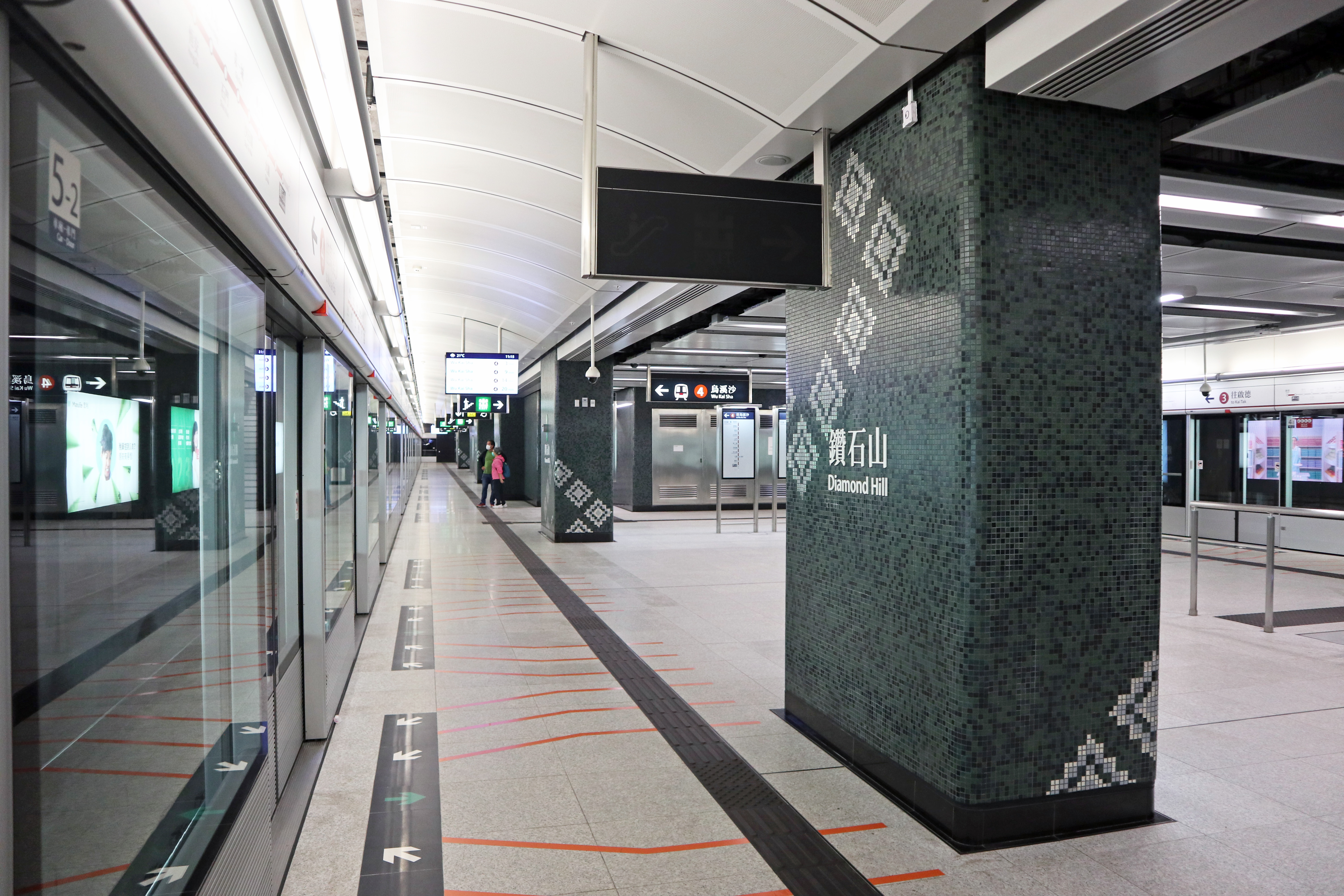
Platform 4

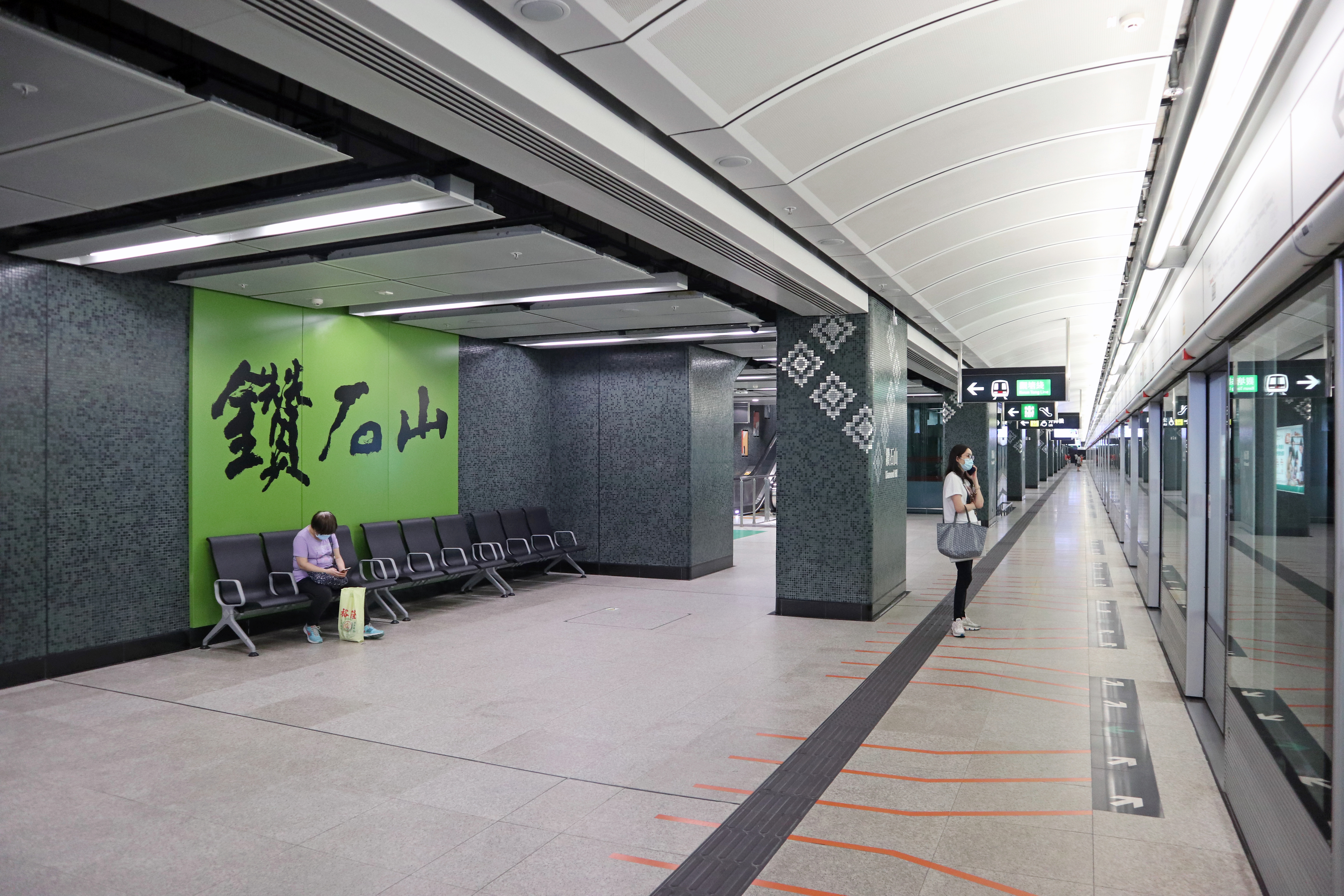
Platform 3 with calligraphy

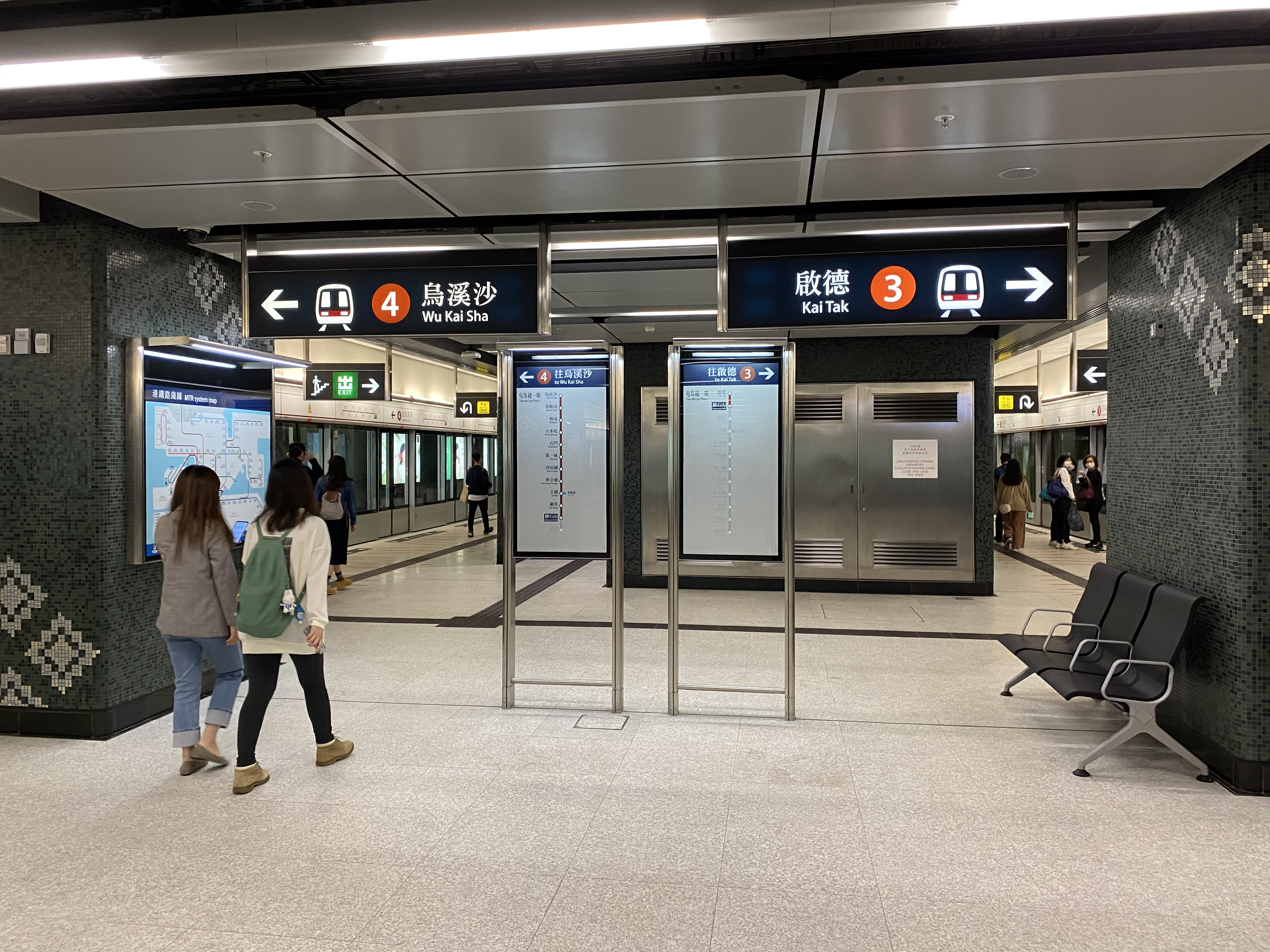
Tuen Ma Line platform signage

The photos were taken while the station was still part of the Tuen Ma Line Phase 1.

== See also ==
- Lion Rock Tunnel (Tuen Ma line)
