= Chi Lin Nunnery =

Buddhist temple complex in Hong Kong

- 志蓮淨苑
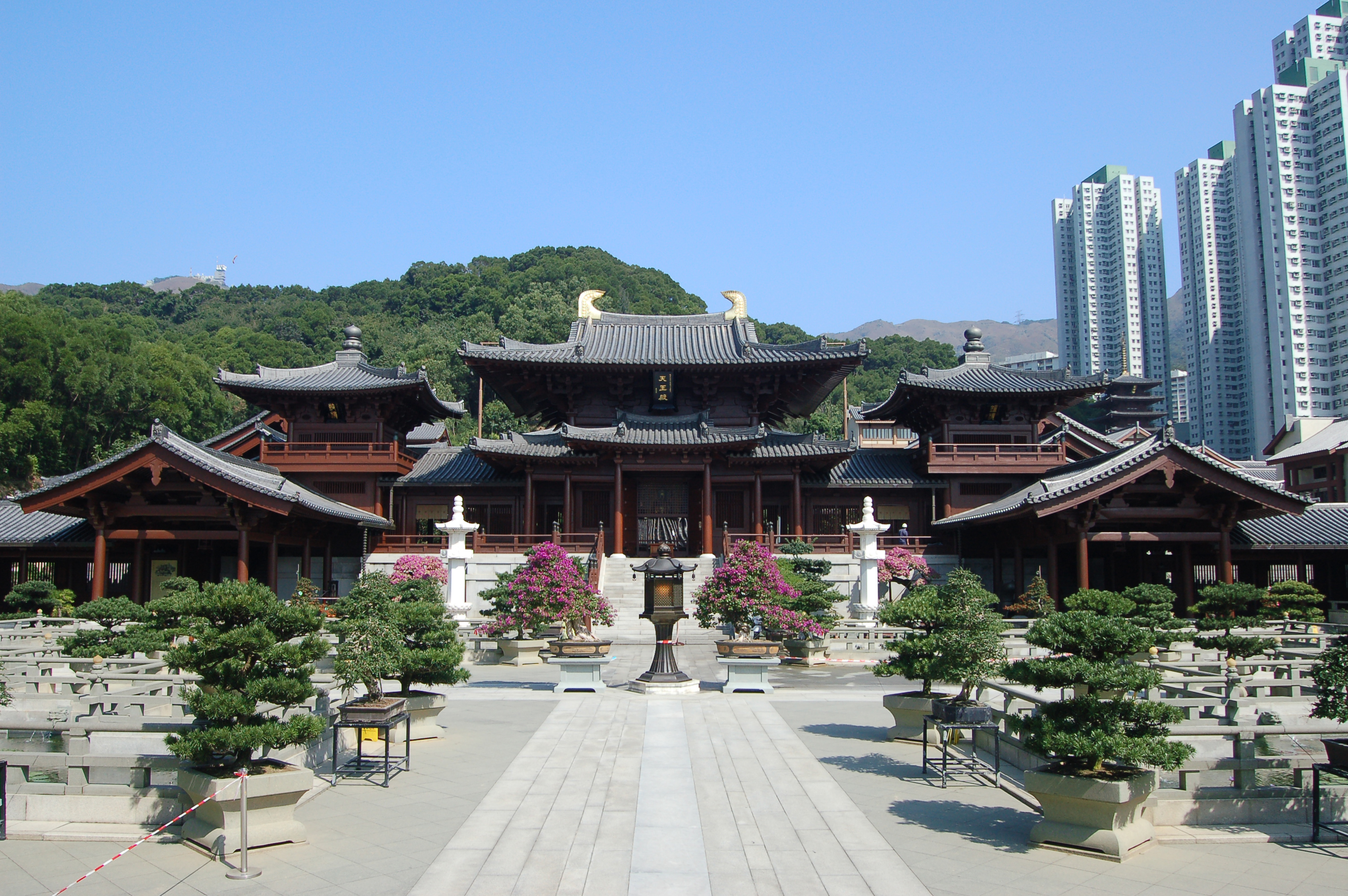
- The Tianwang Hall at Chi Lin Nunnery

- Location within Hong Kong

Religion
- Affiliation: Buddhist
- Status: Active

Location
- Location: 5 Chi Lin Drive, Diamond Hill, Kowloon, Hong Kong
- Country: Hong Kong
- Coordinates: 22°20′26.61″N 114°12′18.77″E

Architecture
- Style: Tang dynasty
- Established: 1934; 92 years ago

Website
- www.chilin.org

Chi Lin Nunnery
- Traditional Chinese: 志蓮淨苑
- Simplified Chinese: 志莲净苑
Transcriptions
Standard Mandarin
- Hanyu Pinyin: Zhìlián Jìng Yuàn
Yue: Cantonese
- Yale Romanization: Jilìhn Jihng Yún
- Jyutping: zi3 lin4 zing6 jyun2

Chi Lin Nunnery (Chinese: 志蓮淨苑; Jyutping: zi3 lin4 zing6 jyun2; Cantonese Yale: Jilìhn Jihng Yún) is a large Buddhist temple complex located in Diamond Hill, Kowloon, Hong Kong. It was founded in 1934 as a retreat for Buddhist nuns and was rebuilt in the 1998 following the traditional Tang dynasty architecture. The temple halls have statues of the Sakyamuni Buddha, the goddess of mercy Guanyin and other bodhisattvas. These statues are made from gold, clay, wood and stone.

The temple halls and the Chinese garden in front of the nunnery are open to the public daily free of charge.

In 2018, a lighting design work has been done for giving the building a new aspect, as close as possible to the original design of the building.

== Design details ==
The Chi Lin Nunnery uses the traditional Tang dynasty architecture with a design based on a Sukhavati drawing in the Mogao Caves. It is constructed entirely with cypress wood, without the use of any nails, and is currently the world's largest hand-made wooden building. This construction is based on traditional Chinese architectural techniques that uses special interlocking systems cut into the wood to hold them in place. The traditional Chinese architecture school adopt this kind of technique to demonstrate the harmony of mankind with nature. The complex with 16 halls, a library, a school, a pagoda, a bell tower and a drum tower, covers an area of more than 33,000 square metres (360,000 sq ft). The Chi Lin Nunnery buildings are the only buildings to be built in this style in modern-day Hong Kong.

As a result of the new lighting design project, small spotlights have been installed on the ground floor and on the roof, while the lower entrance stairs have been illuminated by LEDs strips placed in the handrail.

== Nan Lian Garden ==
The Nan Lian Garden, located in the opposite of the Chi Lin Nunnery, is a Chinese classical garden also built in the style of the Tang dynasty. The scenic garden covers an area of 35,000 square metres (380,000 sq ft) is maintained by the Chi Lin Nunnery.
