= Bowling Green Township, Fayette County, Illinois =

Bowling Green Township
- Township
- Location in Fayette County

- Fayette County's location in Illinois
- Coordinates: 39°11′40″N 88°56′40″W
- Country: United States
- State: Illinois
- County: Fayette
- Established: November 9, 1859

Area
  - Total: 25.53 sq mi (66.1 km^{2})
  - Land: 25.53 sq mi (66.1 km^{2})
  - Water: 0 sq mi (0 km^{2}) 0%
- Elevation: 554 ft (169 m)

Population (2020)
  - Total: 412
  - Density: 16.1/sq mi (6.23/km^{2})
- Time zone: UTC-6 (CST)
  - Summer (DST): UTC-5 (CDT)
- ZIP codes: 62080, 62422, 62431
- FIPS code: 17-051-07562

Bowling Green Township is one of twenty townships in Fayette County, Illinois, USA. As of the 2020 census, its population was 412 and it contained 176 housing units.

== Geography ==
According to the 2021 census gazetteer files, Bowling Green Township has a total area of 25.53 square miles (66.12 km^{2}), all land.

=== Cemeteries ===
The township contains these five cemeteries: Antioch, Beck Private, Buchanan, Lorton and Oak Grove.

== Demographics ==
As of the 2020 census there were 412 people, 111 households, and 101 families residing in the township. The population density was 16.14 inhabitants per square mile (6.23/km^{2}). There were 176 housing units at an average density of 6.89 per square mile (2.66/km^{2}). The racial makeup of the township was 99.27% White, 0.24% African American, 0.00% Native American, 0.00% Asian, 0.00% Pacific Islander, 0.00% from other races, and 0.49% from two or more races. Hispanic or Latino of any race were 0.00% of the population.

There were 111 households, out of which 56.80% had children under the age of 18 living with them, 55.86% were married couples living together, 0.00% had a female householder with no spouse present, and 9.01% were non-families. 9.00% of all households were made up of individuals, and 9.00% had someone living alone who was 65 years of age or older. The average household size was 3.00 and the average family size was 3.06.

The township's age distribution consisted of 34.8% under the age of 18, 1.5% from 18 to 24, 14.4% from 25 to 44, 30.6% from 45 to 64, and 18.6% who were 65 years of age or older. The median age was 43.5 years. For every 100 females, there were 168.5 males. For every 100 females age 18 and over, there were 130.9 males.

The median income for a household in the township was $50,707, and the median income for a family was $50,197. Males had a median income of $22,396 versus $28,533 for females. The per capita income for the township was $25,294. About 17.8% of families and 24.9% of the population were below the poverty line, including 56.0% of those under age 18 and 0.0% of those age 65 or over.

Historical population
Census	Pop.	Note	%±
2000	446		—
2010	457		2.5%
2020	412		−9.8%
U.S. Decennial Census

== School districts ==
- Cowden-Herrick Community Unit School District 3a

== Political districts ==
- Illinois' 19th congressional district
- State House District 102
- State Senate District 51
