= Bowling Green Township, Pettis County, Missouri =

Inactive township in the US state of Missouri

Coordinates: 38.7581°N 93.1067°W

Bowling Green Township is an inactive township in Pettis County, in the U.S. state of Missouri.

Bowling Green Township takes its name from Bowling Green, Kentucky, the native home of a first settler.
