= Bowling Green Township, Chariton County, Missouri =

Township in the American state of Missouri

Coordinates: 39.3759166°N 92.9955077°W

Bowling Green Township is a township in Chariton County, in the U.S. state of Missouri.

Bowling Green Township was established in 1840, and most likely was named after Bowling Green, Kentucky.
