= Bowling Green Plateau =

Ice plateau in Antarctica

Bowling Green Plateau (79°42′S 158°36′E) is a small but prominent ice-covered plateau at the north side of the Brown Hills in the Cook Mountains in Antarctica. It was named by the Victoria University of Wellington Antarctic Expedition (VUWAE) (1962–63); Professor Charles C. Rich, geologist and deputy leader of the VUWAE, was affiliated with Bowling Green State University of Ohio. It is associated with the Bowling Green Col.

== See also ==
- Gatson Ridge
