= Diamond Hill =

Hill and area in Kowloon, Hong Kong

Coordinates: 22.34117°N 114.20107°E

- Traditional Chinese: 鑽石山
- Simplified Chinese: 钻石山
Transcriptions
Standard Mandarin
- Hanyu Pinyin: Zuànshí Shān
Yue: Cantonese
- Yale Romanization: Jyun sehk sāan
- Jyutping: zyun3 sek6 saan1

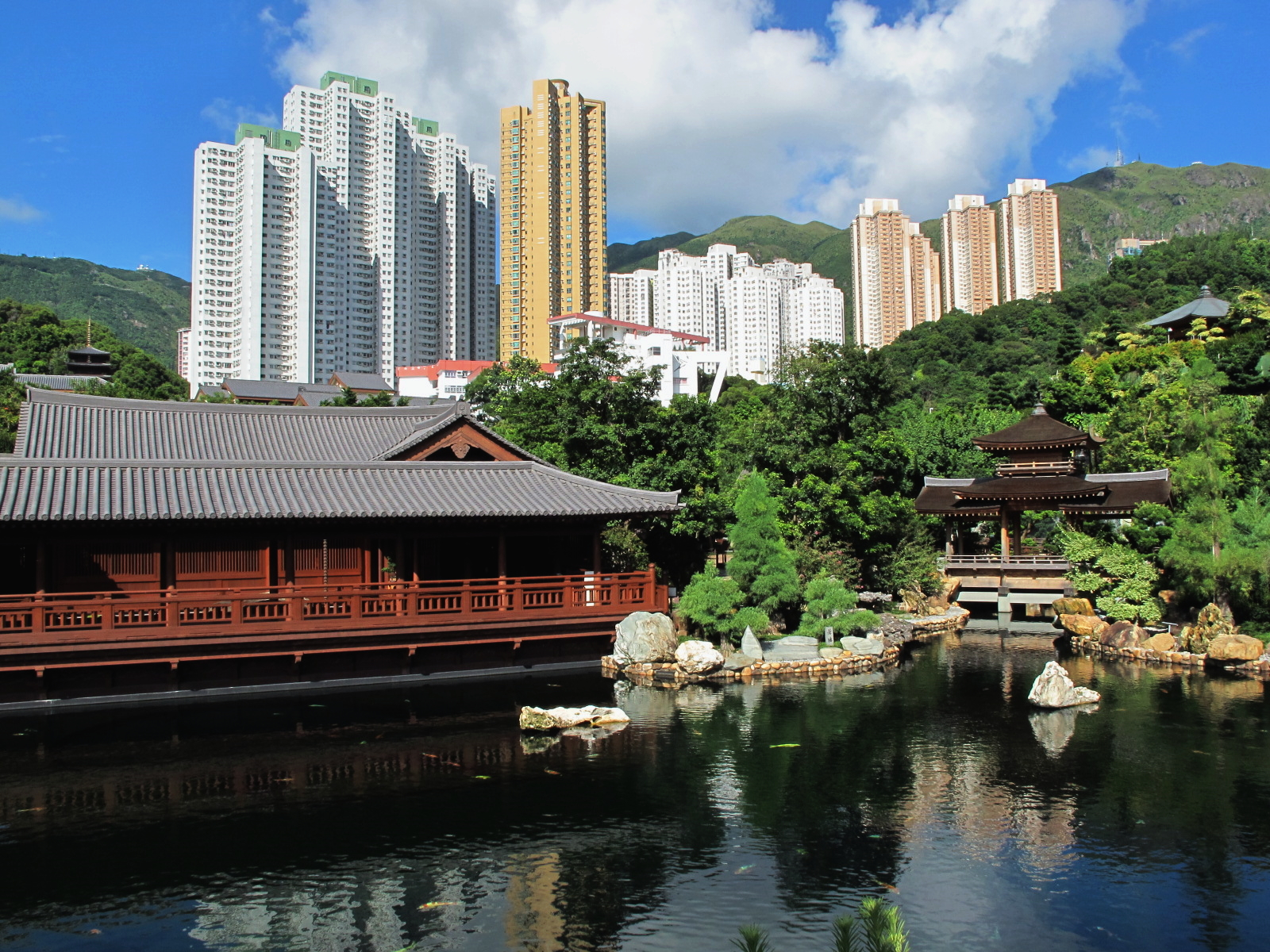
Nan Lian Garden in Diamond Hill.

Diamond Hill is a hill in the east of Kowloon, Hong Kong. The name also refers to the area on or adjacent to the hill. It is surrounded by Ngau Chi Wan, San Po Kong, Wong Tai Sin and Tsz Wan Shan. Its northeast is limited by the ridge. It is principally a residential district. Administratively, the area is part of Wong Tai Sin District.

== History ==
The village settlements in the area, Sheung Yuen Leng (上元嶺) and Ha Yuen Leng (下元嶺), predated British colonization, and may have been established as early as the early eighteenth century.

There were squatter dwellings (shanties) up and down the hill that were demolished after years of effort by the Hong Kong Government. The squatter population peaked at around 50,000 people. Parts of the squatter settlement were demolished over the years, including for expansion of the Kai Tak Airport during the Japanese occupation, construction of the Mass Transit Railway, Lung Cheung Road, and the Tate's Cairn Tunnel. Due to the dramatic shortage of public housing available for resettlement, the final sections were only demolished in 2001.

Contrary to its name, the area does not contain any diamond deposits. There are a number of theories as to why the misnomer came about, but the most accepted version states that the English name for this area was a simple mistranslation, for in Cantonese, the word "鑽石" can mean either "diamonds" or "to drill for rocks". In this case, the area was known as a stone quarry for many years before urban development took place. Due to that, the English name only became a euphemism. There are other theories as to why the area became known as "Diamond Hill", such as the crystals contained within the rocks mined from the area have a diamond-like luminance, or that the hill resembles the shape of a diamond.

== Features ==
Diamond Hill MTR station is located near Plaza Hollywood, a nearby shopping centre was so named to associate it with the former movie studio nearby, where many films were produced after World War II. It most notably launched the career of international star, Bruce Lee. Sam Hui and brothers lived around the area, too. Tate's Cairn Tunnel has its Kowloon entrance in Diamond Hill. The shopping centre has an array of shops and many boutiques. There are also many restaurants serving a variety of cuisines, serving Japanese food, and dishes from America, and Asia.

The Buddhist Chi Lin Nunnery and Nan Lian Garden were built according to the style of the Tang dynasty and are tourist attractions.

== Education ==
Diamond Hill is in Primary One Admission (POA) School Net 45. Within the school net are multiple aided schools (operated independently but funded with government money); no government primary schools are in this net.

== In popular culture ==
- Diamond Hill - Memories of growing up in a Hong Kong squatter village, written by Feng Chi-sun and published by Blacksmith Books in November 2009, presents the early days of a life shaped by a now-extinct community.
- Many location shots were taken within the squatter settlement, which came to visually represent poverty in Hong Kong films.
- Diamond Hill was the setting for the films Diamond Hill (發光的石頭) by the director Cheang Pou-soi, and Hollywood Hong Kong (香港有個荷里活) by director Fruit Chan.
- In the film A Better Tomorrow II, Ken Gor is referred to as "The King of Diamond Hill" (鑽石山小霸王) before turning his back on a life of crime.
- The author Kit Fan's first novel is called Diamond Hill and is set in the area in the 1980s.

== See also ==
- Public housing estates in Diamond Hill
- Tai Hom Village
- Diamond Hill station
