= Brown Hills =

Group of mountains in Antarctica

ins
- Location within Antarctica

Highest point
- Peak: Wright Hill
- Elevation: 1,850 m (6,070 ft)

Geography
- Continent: Antarctica
- Range coordinates: 79°46′S 158°33′E
- Parent range: Cook Mountains

The Brown Hills (79°46′S 158°33′E) are a group of mainly snow-free hills in the Cook Mountains of Antarctica.

== Location ==
The Brown Hills lie north of the lower reaches of Darwin Glacier. They are north of Diamond Hill and are adjacent to Diamond Glacier, a distributary of the Darwin Glacier. To the east they are bordered by the Ross Ice Shelf. On the west side, the Touchdown Glacier flows south to the Darwin Glacier between Roadend Nunatak and the Brown Hills. Reeves Bluffs are to the north of the hills.

The hills were named for their color by the Darwin Glacier Party of the Commonwealth Trans-Antarctic Expedition (1956–58).

== Geology ==
During glacial periods, Diamond Glacier would probably have flowed over the Brown Hills to the Ross Ice Shelf. Exposure ages of five glacial erratics from the Brown Hills range from 7,000 to 205,000 years ago, which implies that until 7,000 years ago the Brown Hills saddle was ice-covered. Simpson 2002 proposes that the Darwin calcic suite, a K-series, I-type, volcanic arc granitoid, includes the Carlyon Granitoid among other rock types. The Brown Hills are mostly made up of the Carlyon Granitoid, which includes an variably foliated, biotite-hornblende granodiorite and granite.

== Glaciers ==
=== Bartrum Glacier ===
79°44′S 158°44′E. A small steeply crevassed glacier in the Brown Hills, flowing west between Bowling Green Plateau and Blank Peaks. Mapped by the VUWAE (1962-63). Named after J.A. Bartrum (1885-1949), Professor of Geology at the University of Auckland, New Zealand.

=== Foggydog Glacier ===
79°47′S 158°40′E A glacier between Blank Peaks and Mount Rich in the Brown Hills. Mapped by the VUWAE (1962-63) and so named because in plan the glacier is shaped like the head and neck of a dog, with a moraine suggesting a collar and a glacial lake in the position of the ears. Fog accumulated regularly over the glacier.

== Features ==
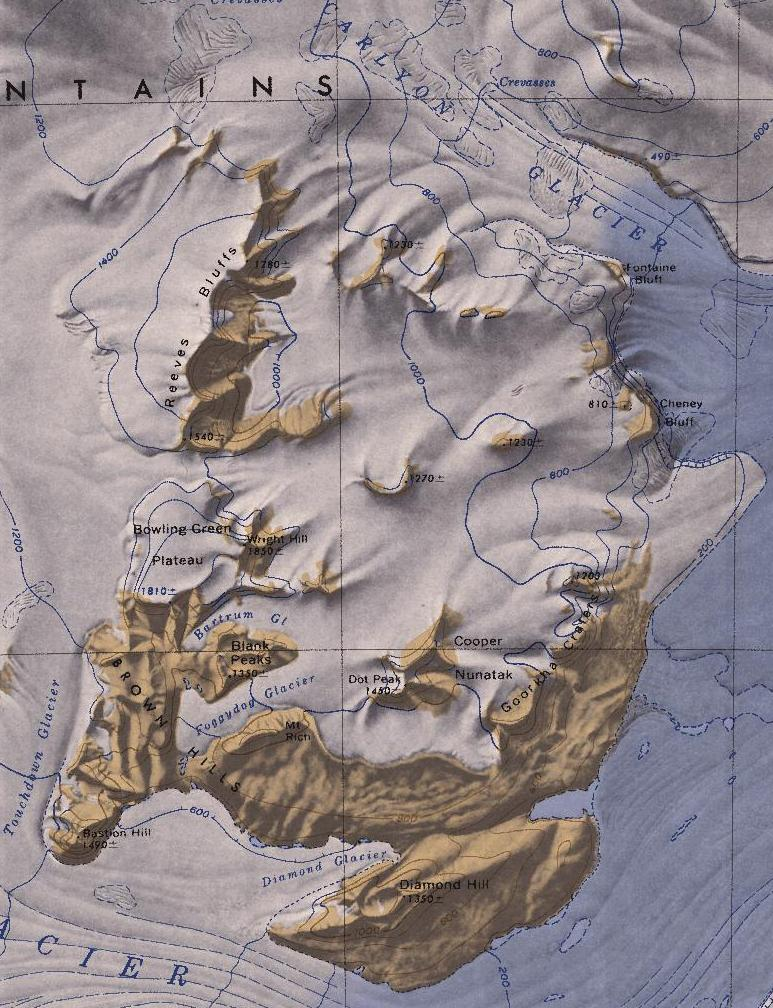
Southeast massif of the Cook Mountains. Brown Hill in the southwest

=== Bastion Hill ===
79°50′S 158°19′E. A prominent ice-free feature in the Brown Hills, rising to 1,490 metres (4,890 ft) and projecting southward into Darwin Glacier just east of Touchdown Glacier. The descriptive name was given by the Darwin Glacier Party of the CTAE (1956-58).

=== Mount Rich ===
79°47′S 158°48′E An isolated peak in the Brown Hills, 5 miles (8.0 km) northwest of Diamond Hill. Named by the VUWAE (1962-63) for Charles C. Rich, USARP geologist who served as deputy leader and geologist of the expedition.

=== Erewhon Basin ===
79°48′S 158°34′E. An extensive ice-free area forming a basin in the Brown Hills separating the snouts of the Foggydog and Bartrum Glaciers from the northern edge of the Darwin Glacier. Explored by the VUWAE, 1962-63, and named from Samuel Butler's novel Erewhon.

=== Goorkha Craters ===
79°45′S 159°34′E. A line of snow-free coastal hills 5 miles (8.0 km) long, standing 2 miles (3.2 km) east of Cooper Nunatak between Carlyon and Darwin Glaciers. Discovered and named by the BrNAE (1901-04).

=== Blank Peaks ===
79°45′S 158°45′E. A cluster of ice-free peaks occupying the isolated ridge between Bartrum and Foggydog Glaciers in the Brown Hills. Mapped by the VUWAE (1960-61) and named for H. Richard Blank, geologist with the expedition. Not: Blank Peninsula.

=== Bowling Green Plateau ===
79°42′S 158°36′E. A small but prominent ice-covered plateau at the north side of the Brown Hills in the Cook Mountains. Named by the VUWAE (1962-63). Prof. Charles C. Rich, geologist and deputy leader of the VUWAE, was affiliated with Bowling Green State University, Ohio.

=== Bowling Green Col ===
79°40′S 158°35′E. An ice-filled east–west col between Reeves Plateau and Bowling Green Plateau in the Cook Mountains. It was named by the Advisory Committee on Antarctic Names in association with Bowling Green Plateau.

=== Gatson Ridge ===
79°43′S 158°51′E. A jagged ridge, 3 nautical miles (6 km) long with an elevation of 1158m. It runs east from the southern part of Bowling Green Plateau in the Brown Hills of the Cook Mountains. It was named by the Advisory Committee on Antarctic Names after Karl W. Gatson of the United States Geological Survey (USGS), a topographic engineer on the joint 1975–76 USGS – British Antarctic Survey project to establish control points for Landsat mosaics of Palmer Land, and to establish geodetically tied independent survey nets in the Ellsworth Mountains and Antarctic Peninsula into a worldwide reference system using Doppler satellite control.

=== Wright Hill ===
79°42′S 158°46′E. A large flat-topped hill at the east side of Bowling Green Plateau in the Cook Mountains. Mapped by the Darwin Glacier Party of the CTAE (1956-58). Named after D. Wright, a member of the CTAE who accompanied Sir Edmund Hillary to the South Pole.

== Sources ==
- Alberts, Fred G., ed. (1995), Geographic Names of the Antarctic (PDF) (2 ed.), United States Board on Geographic Names This article incorporates public domain material from websites or documents of the United States Board on Geographic Names.
- "Bowling Green Col", Geographic Names Information System, United States Geological Survey, United States Department of the Interior
- Carlyon Glacier, USGS United States Geologic Survey, 1960
- "Gatson Ridge", Geographic Names Information System, United States Geological Survey, United States Department of the Interior
- Hillebrand, Trevor R.; Stone, John O.; Koutnik, Michelle; King, Courtney; Howard Conway; Brenda Hall; Keir Nichols; Brent Goehring; Mette K. Gillespie (2021), "Holocene thinning of Darwin and Hatherton glaciers, Antarctica and implications for grounding-line retreat in the Ross Sea" (PDF), The Cryosphere, 15 (7): 3329–3354, Bibcode:2021TCry...15.3329H, doi:10.5194/tc-15-3329-2021
- Simpson, Alanna Leigh (2002), Felsic magmatism in the Darwin Glacier region, southern Victoria land, Antarctica, University of Otago
