= Darwin =

Darwin may refer to:

- Charles Darwin (1809–1882), English naturalist and writer, originator of the theory of biological evolution by natural selection
- Darwin, Northern Territory, a capital city in Australia, named after the naturalist

Darwin may also refer to:

== Arts and entertainment ==
=== Films ===
- Darwin (1920 film), a German silent film
- Darwin (2011 film), a documentary
- Darwin (2015 film), a science fiction film by Alain Desrochers

=== Other uses in arts and entertainment ===
- Darwin!, a 1972 album by Italian band Banco del Mutuo Soccorso
- Darwin: The Life of a Tormented Evolutionist, a 1991 biography of Charles Darwin

== Computing ==
- Darwin (ADL), an architecture description language
- Darwin (operating system), the Unix base for Apple's iOS and macOS operating systems
- Darwin (programming language)
- Darwin (video game), a 1961 programming game
- Darwin Information Typing Architecture
- Darwin Streaming Server

== People ==
- Darwin (given name), including a list of people with the name
- Darwin (surname), including a list of people with the name

== Places ==
=== Antarctica ===
- Darwin Glacier (Antarctica), Oates Land
- Darwin Mountains, Oates Land
- Mount Darwin (Antarctica), Ross Dependency

=== Australia ===
==== Northern Territory ====
- Darwin, Northern Territory, the capital city of NT
- Darwin River, Northern Territory
- City of Darwin, the local government area and authority
- Division of Darwin, a 1903–1955 election division

==== Tasmania ====
- Darwin, Tasmania, a short-lived community
- Darwin Crater, a suspected meteorite impact crater
- Mount Darwin (Tasmania)

=== Chile ===
- Cordillera Darwin, Tierra del Fuego, a mountain range
- Darwin Channel
- Darwin Sound
- Mount Darwin (Andes)

=== United States ===
- Darwin, California, an unincorporated community
- Darwin Falls, a waterfall in California
- Darwin Township, Clark County, Illinois
  - Darwin, Illinois, an unincorporated community in the township
- Darwin, Minnesota, a city in Meeker County
- Darwin, Ohio, an unincorporated community
- Darwin, Oklahoma, an unincorporated community
- Darwin, Texas, a ghost town
- Darwin, Virginia, an unincorporated community
- Darwin Township, Meeker County, Minnesota
- Mount Darwin (California)
  - Darwin Glacier (California), on Mount Darwin

=== Elsewhere ===
- Darwin (ward), an electoral ward in Greater London
- Darwin, Falkland Islands, a settlement
- Darwin, Río Negro, Argentina, a municipality
- Darwin Glacier (Kenya), on Mount Kenya
- Darwin Island, Galapagos Islands
- Mount Darwin (New Zealand)
- Volcán Darwin, Galapagos Islands, a volcano

== Science and technology ==
=== Places or objects in space ===
- 1991 Darwin, a main-belt asteroid
- Darwin (lunar crater), on the Moon
- Darwin (Martian crater), on Mars

=== Other uses in science ===
- Darwin (spacecraft), a European Space Agency project
- Darwin (unit), a unit of evolutionary change
- Darwin Centre, Natural History Museum, London
- Darwin Initiative, a British government biodiversity programme
- Darwin Medal, awarded by the Royal Society for biology

== Sport ==
- Darwin Baseball League, a North Australian league
- Darwin Rugby League, a North Australian league

== Transport ==
- Darwin Airline, an airline in Switzerland
- Darwin International Airport, Darwin, Australia

== Other uses ==
- Darwin (monkey), a rhesus macaque colloquially referred to as the "Ikea Monkey"
- Darwin Awards, tongue-in-cheek awards for people who remove themselves from reproducing through their stupidity
- Darwin Brewery, based in North Shields, England
- Darwin Centre (disambiguation)
- Darwin College (disambiguation)

== See also ==
- Bombing of Darwin, also known as the Battle of Darwin, a 1942 Japanese aerial attack on Australia
- Darvin (disambiguation)
- Darwen (disambiguation)
- Darwyn, a former English rock band
- Port Darwin (disambiguation)
- XDarwin
