= Roseli Ocampo-Friedmann =

Filipino-American microbiologist

- Born: November 23, 1937; Manila
- Died: September 4, 2005 (aged 67); Kirkland, Washington, US
- Education: University of the Philippines; Hebrew University
- Alma mater: Florida State University
- Spouse: Imre Friedmann
- Awards: Antarctica Service Medal
- Scientific career
- Fields: Microbiology; Botany

Roseli Ocampo-Friedmann (November 23, 1937 – September 4, 2005) was a Filipino-American microbiologist and botanist who specialized in the study of cyanobacteria and extremophiles. Her work has been cited in work exploring the terraforming of Mars.

== Biography ==
Ocampo-Friedmann was born Roseli Ocampo on November 23, 1937 in Manila, Philippines to Eliseo and Generosa Ocampo.

She earned a degree in botany from the University of the Philippines in 1958. After completing her master's at Hebrew University in Jerusalem in 1966, she returned to the Philippines to work for Manila's National Institute of Science and Technology. In 1968, she joined Dr. Imre Friedmann at Florida State University where she received her PhD in 1973. Roseli married Friedmann in 1974. In 1987, she became a professor at Florida A&M University in Tallahassee, while working summers at Florida State University with Friedmann. Later in her career, she served as a scientific consultant for the SETI Institute.

Together with her husband, the couple traveled internationally to study algae and other microorganisms. In the mid-1970s, the couple went to the Ross Desert in the Dry Valleys region of Antarctica, where the mountain ranges were thought to be lifeless. They were a frigid, arid area mostly without ice or snow. These microorganisms (called cryptoendoliths) would tolerate the cold and in the summer thaw, rehydrate, and photosynthesize, and were able to colonize the Beacon sandstone. After successfully culturing them in the laboratory with her "blue-green thumb", the couple wrote an article detailing their discovery on September 24, 1976. This work was cited by NASA and Walter Cronkite as the basis for life on Mars when the Viking 1 spacecraft touched down on the planet on July 20, 1976 as the planet has similar conditions.

Friedmann Peak, in the Darwin Mountains of Antarctica, where she co-discovered endolithic microorganisms in the Beacon sandstone, is named after her. The National Science Foundation awarded her the Antarctic Service Medal in 1981.

During her lifetime, she collected over 1,000 types of microorganisms from extreme environments around the world. Ocampo-Friedmann died September 4, 2005, of Parkinson's disease in Kirkland, Washington.

== Publications ==
- Onofri S, Fenice M, Cicalini AR, Tosi S, Magrino A, Pagano S, Selbmann L, Zucconi L, Vishniac HS, Ocampo‐Friedmann R, Friedmann EI. Ecology and biology of microfungi from Antarctic rocks and soils. Italian journal of Zoology. 2000 Jan 1;67(S1):163-7.
- Billi D, Friedmann EI, Hofer KG, Caiola MG, Ocampo-Friedmann R. Ionizing-radiation resistance in the desiccation-tolerant cyanobacterium Chroococcidiopsis. Appl. Environ. Microbiol.. 2000 Apr 1;66(4):1489-92.
- Friedmann EI, Ocampo-Friedmann R. A primitive cyanobacterium as pioneer microorganism for terraforming Mars. Advances in Space Research. 1995 Mar 1;15(3):243-6.
- Grilli Caiola M, Ocampo-Friedmann R, Friedmann EI. Cytology of long-term desiccation in the desert cyanobacterium Chroococcidiopsis (Chroococcales). Phycologia. 1993 Sep 1;32(5):315-22.
- Friedmann EI, Hua M, Ocampo-Friedmann RO. Terraforming Mars: dissolution of carbonate rocks by cyanobacteria. Journal of the British Interplanetary Society. 1993;46:291-2.
- Friedmann EI, Hua M, Ocampo-Friedmann R. 3.6 Cryptoendolithic lichen and cyanobacterial communities of the Ross Desert, Antarctica. Polarforschung. 1988;58(2/3):251-9.
- Bonani G, Friedmann EI, Ocampo-Friedmann R, McKay CP, Woelfli W. Preliminary report on radiocarbon dating of cryptoendolithic microorganisms. Polarforschung. 1988;58(2-3):199.
- Friedmann EI, Ocampo-Friedmann R.Endolithic microorganisms in extreme dry environments: analysis of a lithobiontic microbial habitat. Current perspectives in microbial ecology. 1984:177-85.
- Friedmann EI, Ocampo-Friedmann R. The Antarctic cryptoendolithic ecosystem: relevance to exobiology. Origins of life. 1984 Dec 1;14(1-4):771-6.
- Potts M, Ocampo-Friedmann R, Bowman MA, Tözűn B. Chroococcus S24 and Chroococcus N41 (cyanobacteria): morphological, biochemical and genetic characterization and effects of water stress on ultrastructure. Archives of microbiology. 1983 Aug 1;135(2):81-90.
- Friedmann EI, Ocampo R. Endolithic blue-green algae in the dry valleys: primary producers in the Antarctic desert ecosystem. Science. 1976 Sep 24;193(4259):1247-9.

== See also ==
- Timeline of women in science
