= Darwin Glacier =

Darwin Glacier may refer to:

- Darwin Glacier (Antarctica)
- Darwin Glacier (Chile)
- Darwin Glacier (Kenya), located on Mount Kenya
- Darwin Glacier (New Zealand), located in Canterbury
- Darwin Glacier (California), United States, located in the Sierra Nevada
