= Darwin (given name) =

Darwin is a given name, evolved from the Old English name Deorwine. Notable people with the name include:

- Darwin Andrade (born 1991), Colombian footballer
- Darwin Angeles (born 1968), Honduran boxer
- Darwin Atapuma (born 1988), Colombian cyclist
- Darwin Barney (born 1985), American baseball player
- Darwin Bond (born 1951), American sprinter
- Darwin Bonilla (born 1990), Salvadoran footballer
- Darwin L. Booher (born 1942), American politician
- Darwin Breaux (born 1955), American football, golf and wrestling coach
- Darwin Lumbantobing (born 1956), an Indonesian religious leader, public speaker, and author who served as the 16th Ephorus of Batak Christian Protestant Church
- Darwin Bromley (1950–2019), American attorney and game designer
- Darwin Brown (born 1977), American football player
- Darwin Caldwell, Northern Irish robotics researcher and academic
- Darwin Cerén (born 1989), Salvadoran footballer
- Darwin Cook (born 1958), American basketball coach and former player
- Darwin Correa (born 1977), Uruguayan sprint canoer
- Darwin Cubillán (born 1972), Venezuelan baseball player
- Darwin Davis (born 1993), American basketball player
- Darwin Deason (born 1940), American businessman and political donor
- Darwin Del Fabro (born 1996), Brazilian actor, singer and producer
- Darwin Echeverry (born 1996), Spanish sprinter
- Darwin Espinal (born 1995), Honduran footballer
- Darwin A. Finney (1814–1868), American politician
- Darwin French (1822–1902), American prospector
- Darwin Gonnerman (1947–2015), Canadian football player
- Darwin González (born 1994), Venezuelan footballer
- Darwin Griffin (born 1969), American bicycle motocross racer
- Darwin Hall (1844–1919), American politician
- Darwin Hindman (1933–2019), American politician
- Darwin Hobbs (born 1968), American gospel singer
- Darwin Ireland (born 1971), American football player
- Darwin R. James (1834–1908), American politician
- Darwin Jones (soccer) (born 1992), American soccer player
- Darwin Joston (1937–1998), American actor
- Darwin K. Kyle (1921–1951), U.S. Army soldier
- Darwin Karr (1875–1945), American actor
- Darwin Kastle (born 1971), American gamer
- Darwin Laylo (born 1980), Filipino chess player
- Darwin Lom (born 1997), Guatemalan footballer
- Darwin Lora (born 1986), Bolivian footballer
- Darwin Lumbantobing (born 1956), Indonesian religious leader, public speaker and author
- Darwin Machís (born 1993), Venezuelan footballer
- Darwin D. Martin (1865–1935), American businessman
- Darwin Matheus (born 2001), Venezuelan footballer
- Darwin McCutcheon (born 1962), Canadian ice hockey player
- Darwin Mott (born 1950), Canadian ice hockey player
- Darwin R. Nealey (1919–2002), American politician
- Darwin Nieves (born 1990), Uruguayan footballer
- Darwin Núñez (born 1999), Uruguayan footballer
- Darwin Oliva (born 1989), Honduran-Guatemalan footballer
- Darwin Oordt, American entrepreneur
- Darwin Ortiz (1948–2023), American magician
- Darwin Pacheco (born 1976), Honduran footballer
- Darwin Pantoja (born 1990), Colombian racing cyclist
- Darwin Peters Jr. (born 1964), American stock car racing mechanic, crew chief and driver
- Darwin Peña (born 1977), Bolivian football
- Darwin Pérez (born 1977), Chilean footballer
- Darwin Phelps (1807–1879), American politician
- Darwin Piñeyrúa (1945–1978), Uruguayan athlete
- Darwin Pinzón (born 1994), Panamanian footballer
- Darwin Porter (born 1937), American travel writer
- Darwin Prockop (1929–2024), American biochemist and progenitor cell researcher
- Darwin Diengdoh Pugh (1927–2008), Indian politician
- Darwin Quintero (born 1987), Colombian footballer
- Darwín Ramírez (born 1988), Uruguayan footballer
- Darwin Ramos (1994–2012), Filipino street child and Servant of God
- Darwin Richardson (1812–1860), American Mormon missionary
- Darwin Ríos (born 1991), Bolivian footballer
- Darwin Rivas (born 1990), Ecuadorian footballer
- Darwin Semotiuk (1945–2022), Canadian football coach and professor of kinesiology
- Darwin Shaw, British actor
- Darwin Smith (1926–1995), American businessman
- Darwin William Tate (c. 1889–1962), American politician
- Darwin Teilhet (1904–1964), American novelist
- Darwin Telemaque (born 1968), Dominican cricketer
- Darwin W. Thomas (1894–1954), American judge
- Darwin Thompson (born 1997), American football player
- Darwin Torres (born 1991), Uruguayan footballer
- Darwin T. Turner (1931–1991), American literary critic, scholar, poet and professor
- Darwin Vargas (1925–1998), Chilean composer and choral conductor
- Darwin Walker (born 1977), American football player
- Darwin Yang (born 1996), American chess player
- Darwin Young (1924–2020), American politician
- Darwin Zahedy Saleh (born 1960), Indonesian economist

== Fictional characters ==
- Darwin (character), a Marvel Comics fictional superhero associated with the X-Men
- Darwin, a character in The Wild Thornberrys
- Darwin, a character in G-Force
- Darwin (seaQuest DSV), a dolphin in the TV series seaQuest DSV
- Darwin Watterson, a character in The Amazing World of Gumball

== See also ==
- Darvin (given name)
- Darwin (surname)
- Derwin, given name and surname
