= Darvin =

Darvin may refer to:

- Darvin (given name), includes list of people with the name
- Darvin Furniture & Mattress, Chicago-area furniture store
- Arne Darvin, fictional character in the Star Trek episode "The Trouble with Tribbles"

== See also ==
- Darwin (disambiguation)
