= Medusa Peak =

Mountain in Antarctica

Medusa Peak (79°38′S 157°25′E) is a peak, 1,700 metres (5,600 ft) high, located southeast of Perseus Peak on Tentacle Ridge in the Cook Mountains of Antarctica. It was named is association with other peaks in the area after Medusa, one of the three gorgons of Greek mythology.
