= Perseus Peak =

Mountain in Antarctica

Perseus Peak (79°37′S 157°20′E) is a distinct, triangular peak on Tentacle Ridge, northwest of Medusa Peak in the Cook Mountains. The peak is in bedded Beacon sandstone. Named in association with other peaks in the area after Perseus, the hero in Greek mythology who killed Medusa by cutting off her head with Mercury's sword.
