= Darwin (surname) =

- Pronunciation: /ˈdɑːrwɪn/
- Language: English

Origin
- Language: Old English
- Origin: Deorwine
- Derivation: dēor + wine
- Meaning: 'dear friend'

Darwin is a surname that is a modern spelling of Old English name Deorwine. Notable people with the surname include:

- Members of Charles Darwin's family:
  - Anne Darwin (1841–1851), daughter of Charles Darwin (1809–1882)
  - Bernard Darwin (1876–1961), golf writer
  - Charles Darwin (1809–1882), English naturalist and writer
  - Charles Darwin (1758–1778) physician and scientist, uncle of Charles Darwin (1809–1882)
  - Sir Charles Galton Darwin (1887–1962), physicist
  - Charles Waring Darwin (infant) (1856–1858), youngest son of Charles Darwin (1809–1882)
  - Charles Waring Darwin (soldier) (1855–1928), second cousin once removed of Charles Darwin (1809–1882)
  - Edward Levett Darwin (1821–1901), solicitor and author
  - Elinor Darwin (1871–1954), illustrator, engraver and portrait painter, wife of Bernard Darwin
  - Emma Darwin née Wedgwood (1808–1896), wife of Charles Darwin (1809–1882)
  - Emma Darwin (novelist) (born 1964), novelist
  - Erasmus Darwin (1731–1802), physician and biologist, grandfather of Charles Darwin (1809–1882)
  - Erasmus Darwin IV (1881–1915), businessman and soldier, son of Sir Horace Darwin
  - Erasmus Alvey Darwin (1804–1881), brother of Charles Darwin (1809–1882)
  - Etty Darwin, better known as Henrietta Litchfield (1843–1929), daughter of Charles Darwin (1809–1882)
  - Sir Francis Darwin (1848–1925), botanist
  - Sir Francis Sacheverel Darwin (1786–1859), physician and traveler
  - Sir George Darwin (1845–1912), astronomer and mathematician
  - Gwendoline Mary Darwin, birth name of Gwen Raverat (1885–1957), artist
  - Sir Horace Darwin (1851–1928), civil engineer
  - Ida Darwin (1854–1946), mental health campaigner, wife of Sir Horace Darwin
  - Leonard Darwin (1850–1943), soldier, politician, and activist
  - Emma Nora Darwin, birth name of Nora Barlow (1885–1989), editor and biographer of Charles Darwin (1809–1882)
  - Robert Darwin (1766–1848), physician, father of Charles Darwin (1809–1882)
  - Robert Waring Darwin of Elston (1724–1816), author of Principia Botanica
  - Robin Darwin (1910–1974), artist
  - Ursula Frances Elinor Darwin, birth name of Ursula Mommens (1908–2010), potter
  - William Erasmus Darwin (1839–1914), eldest son of Charles Darwin (1809–1882)
- Ben Darwin (born 1976), Australian international Rugby player
- Bobby Darwin, (born 1943), American baseball player
- Charles Darwin (disambiguation), several people
- Danny Darwin (born 1955), American baseball player
- Donald Victor Darwin (1896–1972) Australian road engineer
- George Darwin (footballer) (1932–2019), English footballer
- Jeff Darwin (born 1969), American baseball player
- John Darwin (disambiguation), several people
- Mike Darwin (born 1955), American writer and activist

== See also ==
- Darwen (disambiguation) § People with the surname Darwen
- Derwin, given name and surname
- Darwin (given name)
