= Port Darwin (disambiguation) =

Port Darwin is a port in the Northern Territory of Australia

Port Darwin may also refer to.

- Electoral division of Port Darwin, an electorate in the Northern Territory of Australia
- Port Darwin FC, a soccer club in the Northern Territory of Australia
- Another name for Darwin, Falkland Islands

== See also ==
- Darwin (disambiguation)
