= Midnight Plateau =

Plateau in Antarctica

- Location within Antarctica

Highest point
- Elevation: 2,200 m (7,200 ft)

Geography
- Continent: Antarctica
- Range coordinates: 79°53′S 156°15′E
- Parent range: Darwin Mountains

Midnight Plateau (79°53′S 156°15′E) is a prominent ice-covered plateau, over 2,200 metres (7,200 ft) high, forming the central feature of the Darwin Mountains in Antarctica. It is the only area of snow accumulation in the Darwin Mountains.

== Exploration and naming ==
The plateau was discovered by the Victoria University of Wellington Antarctic Expedition (VUWAE) of 1962–63 and so named because the feature was visited by expedition members at midnight on December 27, 1962.

== Location ==
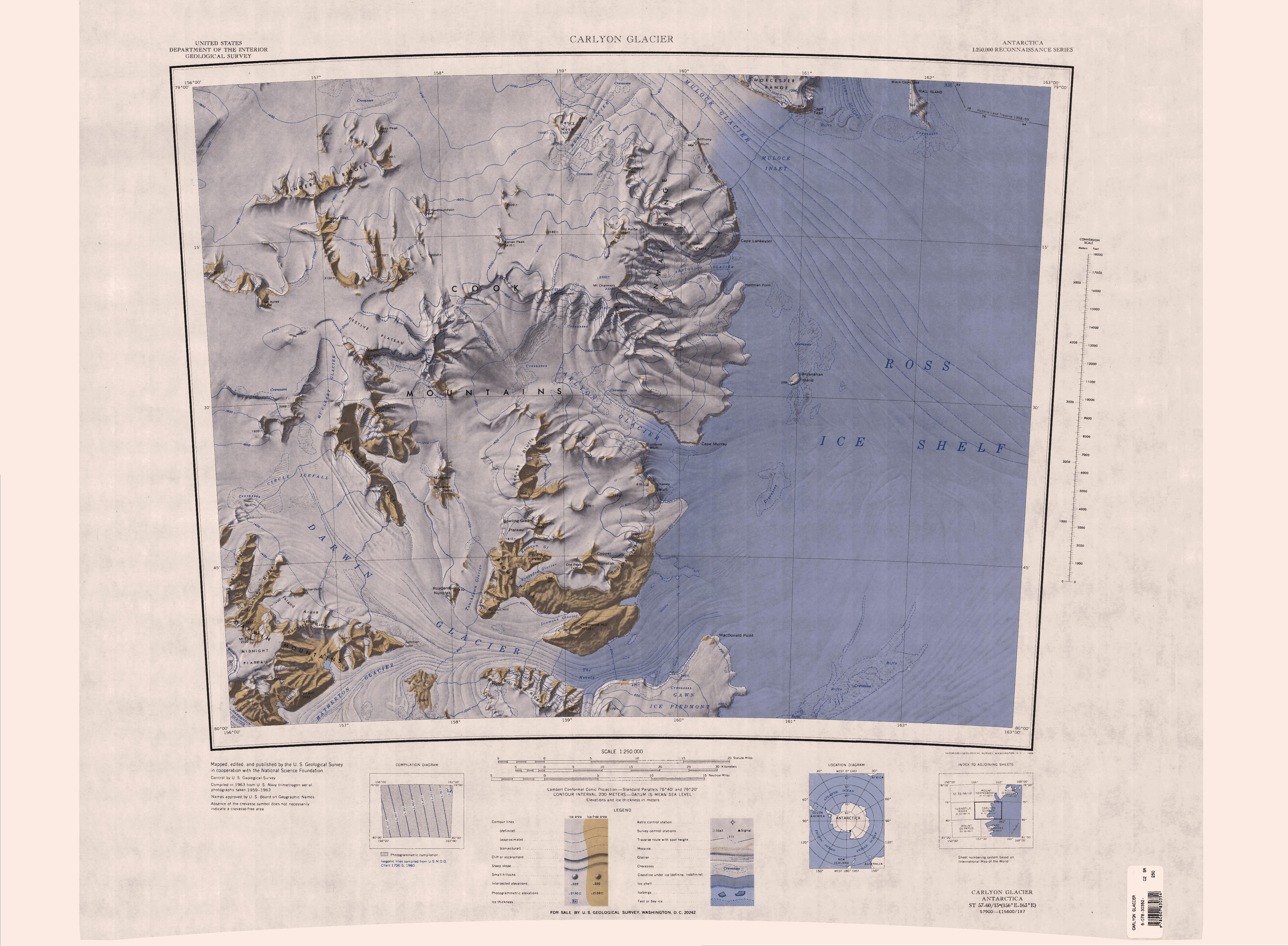
Eastern Darwin Mountains in southwest of map

Midnight Plateau is in the center of the Darwin Mountains. Mount Ellis rises over the north of the plateau. Haskell Ridge and Colosseum Ridge runs north from the plateau to the Darwin Glacier. The plateau rises above the Hatherton Glacier to the south.

== Northern features ==
=== Mount Ellis ===
79°52′S 156°14′E. The highest point, 2,330 metres (7,640 ft) high, surmounting the northern edge of Midnight Plateau. Mapped by the Darwin Glacier Party of the CTAE (1956-58). Named for M.R. Ellis, engineer with the CTAE, who accompanied Sir Edmund Hillary to the South Pole.

=== Exodus Valley ===
79°50′S 156°18′E. A steep moraine-filled valley which descends northward from Midnight Plateau between Colosseum Ridge and Exodus Glacier. So named by the VUWAE (1962-63) because the valley is virtually the only easy route of descent from Midnight Plateau.

=== Exodus Glacier ===
79°50′S 156°22′E. A steep, smooth glacier 1 nautical mile (1.9 km; 1.2 mi) northeast of Mount Ellis, flowing from the north edge of Midnight Plateau to the southwest side of Island Arena. Named by the VUWAE, 1962-63, in association with nearby Exodus Valley.

=== Kennett Ridge ===
79°51′S 156°45′E. A rocky ridge, 6 nautical miles (11 km; 6.9 mi) long, which descends eastward from the northeast end of Midnight Plateau. Mapped by the VUWAE (1962-63) and named for J.P. Kennett, geologist with the expedition.

=== Friedmann Peak ===
79.85°S 156.75°E. A prominent peak rising to 1,920 metres (6,300 ft) in the central part of Kennett Ridge. Named after Roseli Ocampo Friedmann, professor of microbiology, Florida A&M; University, Tallahassee, FL, who worked five austral summers in McMurdo Dry Valleys; co-discoverer there (with E. Imre Friedmann) of endolithic microorganisms in the Beacon sandstone, 1976.

== Eastern features ==
=== Hale Valley ===
79.8666667°S 156.6666667°E The north-most of three largely ice-free valleys that trend east from midnight Plateau in the Darwin Mountains. This valley is immediately south of Kennett Ridge. Named after Mason E. Hale (d.), lichenologist, National Museum of Natural History (Smithsonian), Washington, DC, who worked about six austral summers in the McMurdo Dry Valleys beginning c.1980.

=== McKay Valley ===
79.8833333°S 156.6666667°E The central valley of three largely ice-free valleys that trend east from Midnight Plateau in the Darwin Mountains. Named after Christopher P. McKay, physicist, NASA Ames Research Center, Moffett Field, CA, who carried out investigations in McMurdo Dry Valleys (micrometeorology, thickness of ice in frozen lakes, stability of ground ice) in 15 austral summers beginning c.1980.

=== Wellman Valley ===
79°55′S 156°40′E. A mainly ice-free valley lying just east of Midnight Plateau and north of Mount Ash. Explored by VUWAE, 1962-63, and named for H.W. Wellman, geologist of the Victoria University of Wellington, a participant in three Antarctic expeditions.

== Southern features ==
=== Prebble Icefalls ===
79°54′S 155°55′E. Icefalls on the southwestern side of Midnight Plateau. They occupy two large cirques south westward of Mount Ellis and fall about 900 metres (3,000 ft). Discovered by the VUWAE (1962-63) and named for W.M. Prebble, geologist with the expedition.

=== Polarmail Ledge ===
79.9333333°S 156.2166667°E A relatively flat wedge-shaped platform that rises above Communication Heights in the south part of Midnight Plateau. At 2,000 metres (6,600 ft) high, the feature is similar in elevation and aspect to Skilton Ledge, 1 nautical mile (1.9 km; 1.2 mi) to the east. Named in association with Richard Chapman Johnson of Nazareth, PA, radio operator involved for 16 years (1985-2001) in coordinating MARSgrams and Polarmail which have enabled personnel in Antarctica to communicate with home.

=== Communication Heights ===
79.9666667°S 156.25°E A group of highly eroded ice-free elevations to the south of Midnight Plateau. The feature rises to about 1,800 metres (5,900 ft) high between Conant Valley and Grant Valley. So named because features in the area are named for communication workers.

=== Skilton Ledge ===
79.9333333°S 156.3666667°E A relatively flat rectangular rock platform at the southeast margin of Midnight Plateau, Darwin Mountains. The upper surface 2,070 metres (6,790 ft) high is ice covered but a rock cliff forms the south end. Named after Larry Skilton, Connecticut ham radio operator who made phone patches in the United States to complete radio communications from United States Antarctic Project (USAP) science stations including Palmer, McMurdo, Byrd surface station, and particularly South Pole. He worked a regular nightly schedule for 11 years (1990-2001) and arranged the completion of several thousand calls.

== Sources ==
- Alberts, Fred G., ed. (1995), Geographic Names of the Antarctic (PDF) (2 ed.), United States Board on Geographic Names This article incorporates public domain material from websites or documents of the United States Board on Geographic Names.
- Carlyon Glacier, USGS United States Geologic Survey, 1960
- "Communication Heights", Geographic Names Information System, United States Geological Survey, United States Department of the Interior
- "Friedmann Peak", Geographic Names Information System, United States Geological Survey, United States Department of the Interior
- "Hale Valley", Geographic Names Information System, United States Geological Survey, United States Department of the Interior
- "McKay Valley", Geographic Names Information System, United States Geological Survey, United States Department of the Interior
- "Polarmail Ledge", Geographic Names Information System, United States Geological Survey, United States Department of the Interior
- "Skilton Ledge", Geographic Names Information System, United States Geological Survey, United States Department of the Interior

This article incorporates public domain material from websites or documents of the United States Geological Survey.
