= Darwin Centre =

Darwin Centre may refer to:

== Places ==
=== In Australia ===
- Darwin Entertainment Centre, an arts centre in Darwin, Australia.
- Darwin Convention Centre, a convention centre in Darwin, Australia.
- Darwin Correctional Centre, a prison in Darwin, Australia.

=== In the United Kingdom ===
- The Darwin Centre, education and research centre of the Natural History Museum, London, England.
- Darwin Shopping Centre, a shopping centre in Shrewsbury, England.
- Darwin Centre for Young People, a CAMHS Tier 4 adolescent inpatient unit based in Cambridge, England.

== See also ==
- Darwin (disambiguation) for other places called Darwin.
