= Derwin =

- Gender: Masculine
- Language: English

Origin
- Meaning: "friend of the deer"

Other names
- Related names: Derwyn, Durwin, Darwin

Derwin (also spelled Derwyn) is an English-language given name and surname. It shares the same etymology as the name Darwin with both being derived from the Old English words ‘deor’ (dear) and ‘wine’ (friend). Notable people with the name include:

== Surname ==
- Hal Derwin (1914–1998), American dance bandleader
- Mark Derwin (born 1960), American actor
- Scott Derwin, Australian sports administrator

== Given name ==
- Derwin Abrahams (1903–1974), American film director
- Derwin Brown (1954–2000), American law-enforcement officer and politician
- Derwin Christian (born 1983), Guyanese cricketer
- Derwin Collins (born 1969), American basketball player
- Derwin L. Gray (born 1971), American football player
- Derwin Gray (offensive lineman) (born 1995), American football player
- Derwin James (born 1996), American football player
- Derwin Kitchen (born 1986), American basketball player
- Derwin Martina (born 1994), Dutch association football player
- Derwin Williams (born 1961), American football player

== See also ==
- Darwin (given name)
- Darwin (surname)
