= Imre Friedmann =

American biologist

- Born: 1921
- Died: June 11, 2007 (aged 85–86)
- Education: University of Vienna
- Occupation: biologist
- Spouse: Roseli Ocampo-Friedmann

E. Imre Friedmann (1921 – June 11, 2007) was a biologist, Robert O. Lawton Distinguished Professor of Biology at Florida State University and the NASA Ames Research Center, and Director, Polar Desert Research Center. He studied endolithic microbial communities and astrobiology. After escaping the Holocaust, Friedmann received his Ph.D. in botany from the University of Vienna, Austria in 1951, and he died on June 11, 2007.

Friedmann made important discoveries of life in extreme environments, particularly cryptoendolithic microbial communities that grow within rocks in deserts, including those of Antarctica and the Negev Desert in Israel. He was also interested in terraforming and wrote several articles about the possibility of terraforming Mars using microbes. In later years he was involved with investigations of Martian meteorite ALH84001, which was claimed to contain evidence for early microbial life on Mars.

He was a Foreign Member of the Hungarian Academy of Sciences, and a Concurrent Professor at the University of Nanjing, China.

Friedmann was married to Roseli Ocampo-Friedmann, also a university professor, whom he met when she was a student in Jerusalem.
