= Meteorite Hills =

Group of hills in Antarctica

- Location within Antarctica

Highest point
- Elevation: 1,737 m (5,699 ft)

Geography
- Continent: Antarctica
- Range coordinates: 79°40′S 155°36′E
- Parent range: Darwin Mountains

The Meteorite Hills (79°40′S 155°36′E) are a group of hills, 11 nautical miles (20 km; 13 mi) long, forming the western portion of the Darwin Mountains in Antarctica. The hills are located between the heads of Darwin Glacier and Hatherton Glacier.

== Name ==
The name was proposed by John O. Annexstad of the Meteorite Working Group at the Johnson Space Center, Houston, Texas, in association with field work carried out in this vicinity by the Antarctic Search for Meteorites, led by William A. Cassidy of the University of Pittsburgh, during the 1978–79 season.

== Location ==
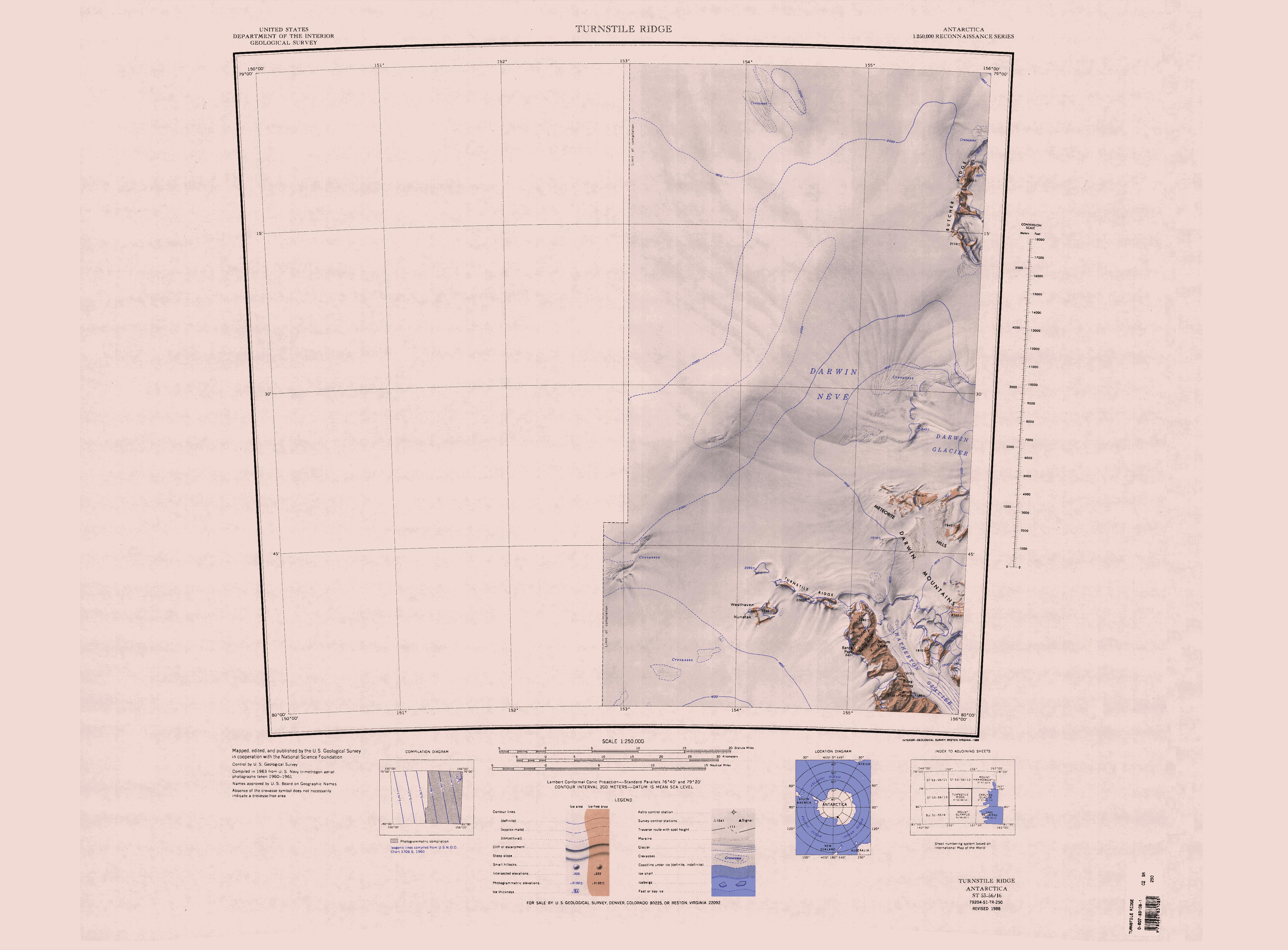
Western Darwin Mountains in southeast of map

The Meteorite Hills are in the northwest of the Darwin Mountains. The Darwin Névé and Darwin Glacier lie to their north. Turnstile Ridge is to the southwest, and the head of the Hatherton Glacier is to the south.

== Features ==
=== Mason Nunatak ===
79.65°S 155.25°E. A nunatak 1 nautical mile (1.9 km; 1.2 mi) long at the northwest end of the Meteorite Hills. Named after Brian Mason of the Department of Mineral Sciences, Smithsonian Institution, Washington, DC, who examined and classified meteorites collected by United States Antarctic Project (USAP) field parties directed by W.A. Cassidy in seven austral summers, 1977-78 through 1983-84.

=== Score Ridge ===
79.65°S 155.8833333°E. A rock ridge 2.5 nautical miles (4.6 km; 2.9 mi) northwest of Lindstrom Ridge in north-central Meteorite Hill. Named after Roberta Score, manager of the Antarctic Meteorite Laboratory, NASA Johnson Space Center, Houston, TX, 1978-96; member of ANSMET meteorite search teams in several areas of the Transantarctic Mountains, 1984-85 and 1988-89 field seasons; supervisor, Crary Science and Engineering Center (McMurdo), 1996-2001.

=== Lindstrom Ridge ===
79.7166667°S 156°E. A ridge on the west side of Green Glacier. The ridge is 4 nautical miles (7.4 km; 4.6 mi) long and forms the east end of Meteorite Hills. Named after Marilyn Lindstrom, curator of Antarctic meteorites at the NASA Johnson Space Center, Houston, Texas, for many years up to 2000.

=== Tether Rock ===
79.6666667°S 156.15°E. A rock outlier 1 nautical mile (1.9 km; 1.2 mi) north of Lindstrom Ridge. The rock marks the north margin of ice-covered Access Slope, a route through the Circle Icefall of upper Darwin Glacier. Named in association with Lindstrom Ridge, to which Tether Rock appears to be subglacially connected.

=== Access Slope ===
79.6833333°S 156.05°E. An ice slope between the north end of Lindstrom Ridge and Tether Rock. The slope is at the west end of the Circle Icefall in Darwin Glacier and appears to be the only route through the icefall. Descriptively named by the Darwin Glacier Party of the Commonwealth Trans-Antarctic Expedition (CTAE), 1956-58, which made the first descent of the glacier.

== Sources ==
- "Access Slope", Geographic Names Information System, United States Geological Survey, United States Department of the Interior
- Alberts, Fred G., ed. (1995), Geographic Names of the Antarctic (PDF) (2 ed.), United States Board on Geographic Names This article incorporates public domain material from websites or documents of the United States Board on Geographic Names.
- "Lindstrom Ridge", Geographic Names Information System, United States Geological Survey, United States Department of the Interior
- "Mason Nunatak", Geographic Names Information System, United States Geological Survey, United States Department of the Interior
- "Score Ridge", Geographic Names Information System, United States Geological Survey, United States Department of the Interior
- "Tether Rock", Geographic Names Information System, United States Geological Survey, United States Department of the Interior
- Turnstyle Ridge, USGS United States Geologic Survey, 1963

This article incorporates public domain material from websites or documents of the United States Geological Survey.
