= John Darwin =

John Darwin may refer to:

- John Darwin (statistician) (1923–2008), Government Statistician of New Zealand
- John Darwin (historian) (born 1948), British historian
- John Darwin disappearance case, British criminal who in 2002 faked his own death in a canoeing accident
