= Darwin Lora =

Bolivian footballer (born 1986)

Personal information
- Full name: Darwin Jesús Lora Vidaurre
- Date of birth: 18 July 1986 (age 40)
- Place of birth: Cochabamba, Bolivia
- Height: 1.74 m (5 ft 9 in)
- Position: Midfielder

Team information
- Current team: Club Atlético Palmaflor
- Number: 16

Senior career*
Years	Team	Apps	(Gls)
2009–2014	Club Aurora		
2014–2015	Club San José		
2015–2017	Nacional Potosí		
2018	Club Aurora		
2019	Sport Boys Warnes		
2020–	Club Atlético Palmaflor		
- * Club domestic league appearances and goals

Darwin Lora (born 10 July 1986) is a Bolivian football midfielder who plays for Club Atlético Palmaflor
