= Darwin Oordt =

American entrepreneur

Darwin Oordt is an American entrepreneur, who has owned publications in the United States.

== Media ==
Oordt's earliest newspaper ventures included the purchase of a small weekly shopper publication in Minnesota, which he soon sold for $14 million. In 1994, Oordt funded and directed the startup of shopper publications for the Providence Journal, successfully launching the newspaper in Rhode Island and Massachusetts Shopper Enterprises’ network of 38 publications. Mr. Oordt also acquired Minnesota Sun Publication from the Guy Gannet Co in 1995. Sun Publication served 329,000 homes in the Minneapolis suburbs. This venture involved the acquisition and complete overhaul of a group of underperforming properties that, under Oordt's ownership and direction, were transformed into a successful nationwide publishing network.

In 2010, Oordt purchased a group of regional newspapers in the Philadelphia Metro area that included the Northeast Times (circulation approximately 111,000) and the Star and Home News (circulation approximately 60,000) and formed Broad Street Media, LLC. Oordt subsequently closed several publications, including the Star of Manayunk, East Falls and Roxborough; the Three Star (serving Kensington, Harrowgate and Juniata; and the Girard Home News, a newspaper that served the Philadelphia neighborhoods of Fairmount, Brewerytown and Francisville for over 70 years. In 2015, Oordt and Broad Street Media purchased Philadelphia Weekly and the South Philly Review. The deal was finalized on Monday, Feb. 2, 2015. Although under the same ownership group, Philadelphia Weekly and the South Philly Review operate under R.P.M. Philly, LLC, while the Northeast Times, Star, the Midweek Wire, NJ Wire and Employment Weekly operate under Broad Street Media.

Broad Street Media LLC announced on September 30, 2015 that it acquired the intellectual property rights to Philadelphia City Paper, the city's longest-running alternative weekly, from SB New York Inc. SB New York also owns Metro, a free daily distributed in New York, Philadelphia and Boston. It purchased City Paper in August 2014. City Paper was founded in 1981 and had a circulation of approximately 70,000. As a result of the acquisition, City Paper ceased publication on Oct. 8, 2015. "There are several common partners in Broad Street Media and R.P.M. Philly. It is expected they will consolidate operations and incorporate the best features of City Paper into Philly Weekly," a statement posted to BSMPhilly.com on Sept. 20, 2015 read. All City Paper editorial staff positions were eliminated, and the closure of the paper caused some controversy due to the fact that editors and reporters learned the news only after a press release was issued to other media outlets.

Broad Street Media's headquarters are located at 3412 Progress Drive in the suburban Bucks County town of Bensalem, Pa., with an additional offices in Cherry Hill, New Jersey, as well as 1617 JFK Blvd. (Philadelphia Weekly) and 12th and Porter streets (South Philly Review) in Philadelphia.

== Other interests ==
In the 1990s, Oordt developed a successful breeding operation for Tennessee Walking show horses. He ran a barn with over 100 head of horses and a breeding operation, and has produced numerous champion sires and award winners. Oordt is active as a counselor/mentor for small businesses, offering advice and the benefit of his extensive experience and success to small business owners. He also serves on numerous national boards and industry councils, including the National Association of Advertising Publishers, Independent Free Papers of America and The Tennessee Walking Horse Owners Association.
