= Darwin Del Fabro =

Brazilian actor and singer

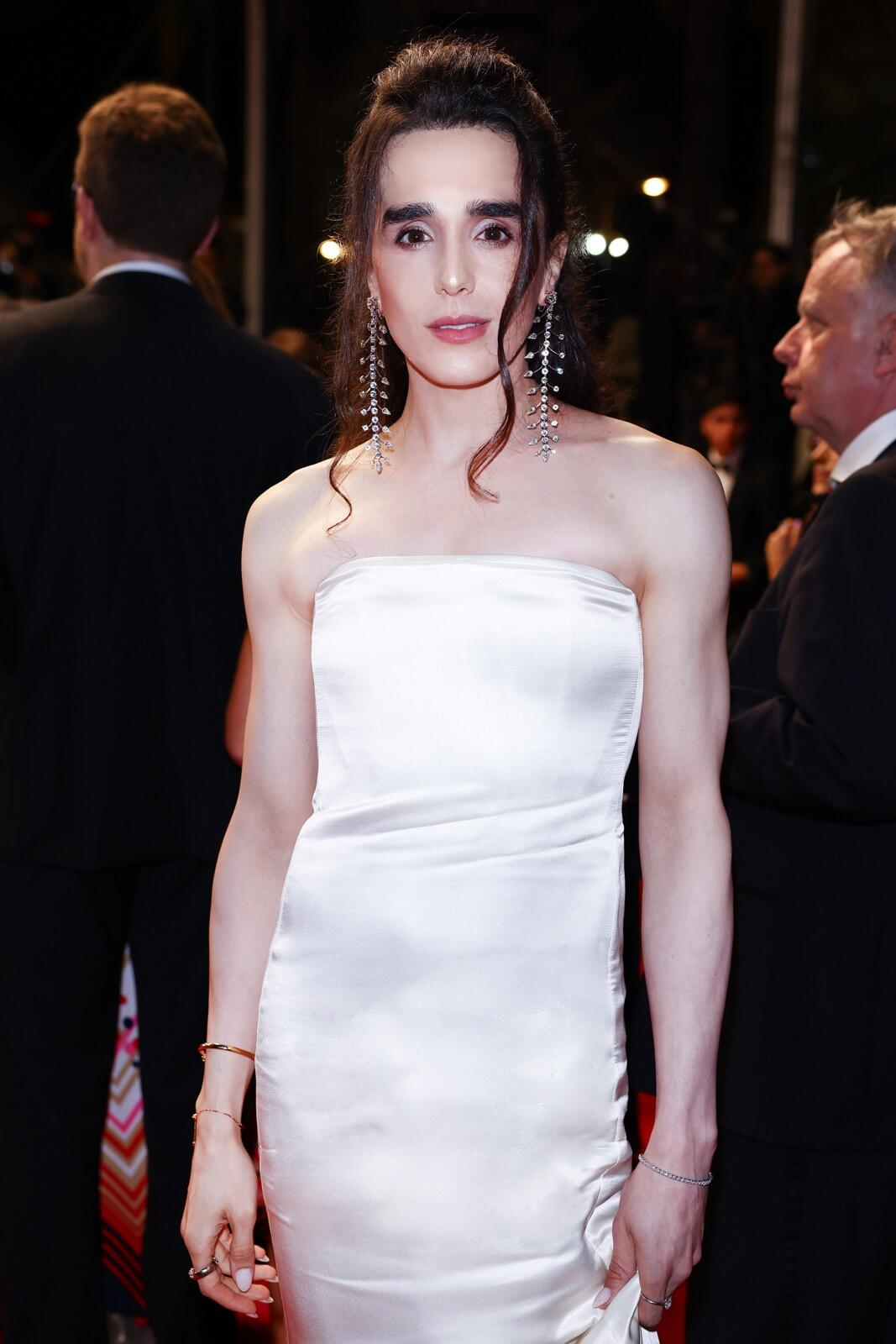
- Born: December 12, 1996 (age 29); Santa Maria, Rio Grande do Sul, Brazil
- Years active: 2016-present
- Known for: LGBTQ actress, singer, and producer
- Website: darwindelfabro.com

Darwin Del Fabro (born December 12, 1996) is a Brazilian actress.

== Early life ==
Darwin Del Fabro was born in Santa Maria, Rio Grande do Sul, Brazil. Both of her parents are fashion models and met while working in New York. Her father became an actor, and she was raised by her stepmother who had a television show in Brazil.

At the age of 14, she moved alone to Rio de Janeiro to further her career. She studied Portuguese literature at the Universidade Candido Mendes in Rio as well as classical and contemporary ballet.

== Career ==
Del Fabro made her professional debut in the musical Era no tempo do rei, directed by João Fonseca at the Joãn Caetano Theater in Rio de Janeiro. She studied theater with Daniel Herz at Casa de Cultura Laura Alvim where she performed in two plays, A Outra and Lapso de Mim Mesmo. A year later, Del Fabro created a play that, years later, was performed in New York City where she met writer/director John Logan.

Del Fabro produced, directed, and starred in the musical Be Careful, It's My Heart in 2015. The show was also adapted into an album and released the following year.

In 2015, Del Fabro started a production company, by the name of Madalena Production.

In 2016, Del Fabro played the role of Einar Wegener in the Sesc Copacabana's stage production of Lili based on the diaries of Lili Elbe in Rio de Janeiro.

Del Fabro was cast in her first television role playing Collete D'or (Astolfo Lemos) in the 2016 TV Globo miniseries Ligações Perigosas, which was inspired by the French novel Dangerous Liaisons. In preparation to play the role, Del Fabro joined a running group and lost five pounds. She also bought high heels, necklaces, bracelets, earrings, and makeup to further immerse herself in the character.

The following year, she starred as Castrato in the Brazilian television soap opera Novo Mudo, which aired on TV Globo.

In 2017, Del Fabro moved to New York City where she enrolled in the musical theater program at the Broadway Dance Center taking 24 classes per week while also learning to speak English. The following year she performed at Feinstein's 54/Below to promote her second album, Darwin Del Fabro in NY. She later starred as Puck in the Juneberry Collective production of A Midsummer Night's Dream, and as Adam in The Feather Doesn't Fall Far from the Tree produced at New York's Signature Theatre Company. In 2019, she starred as Domenic in the off-Broadway play Real, produced by The Tank.

Del Fabro secured her first U.S. film role as Gabriel Hernandez in the slasher film They/Them, written and directed by John Logan. The role was specifically written for Del Fabro. The film debuted on the Peacock Network in August 2022.

== Personal life ==
Del Fabro's native language is Portuguese. She learned to speak English after moving to New York City in 2017 to pursue a career as a performer. In December 2024, she wrote about her gender transition and identity.
