= Darwin College =

Darwin College may refer to:

- Darwin College, Cambridge, England, a constituent college of the University of Cambridge
- Darwin College, Kent
- Darwin Community College, a predecessor of Charles Darwin University, Darwin, Australia
- Darwin College (Mauritius)
- Darwin College, a fictional college in the film Horse Feathers
