= Darwen (disambiguation) =

Darwen is a market town and civil parish in Lancashire, England.

Darwen may also refer to:

- River Darwen, a river that runs through Darwen and Blackburn in Lancashire, England
- Darwen (UK Parliament constituency) was a county constituency in Lancashire, centred on the town of Darwen, England
- Darwen Group was a bus manufacturer located in Blackburn, Lancashire, England

== Football clubs ==
- A.F.C. Darwen, a football club from Darwen, Lancashire, England
- Darwen F.C. was a football club from Darwen, Lancashire, England

== People with the surname Darwen ==
- Hugh Darwen (born 1943), British computer scientist
- Wayne Darwen, Australian journalist and television producer

== See also ==
- Darwin (disambiguation)
