= Darvin (given name) =

Darvin is a masculine given name. Notable people with the name include:

- Darvin Adams (born 1990), American-born Canadian football player
- Dárvin Chávez (born 1989), Mexican footballer
- Darvin Ebanks (born 1993), American soccer player
- Darvin Edwards (born 1986), Saint Lucian athlete
- Darvin Ham (born 1973), American basketball player and coach
- Darvin Kidsy (born 1995), American football player
- Darvin Moon (1963–2020), American logger and poker player

== See also ==
- Darwin (given name)
