= Darvin Furniture & Mattress =

American furniture store

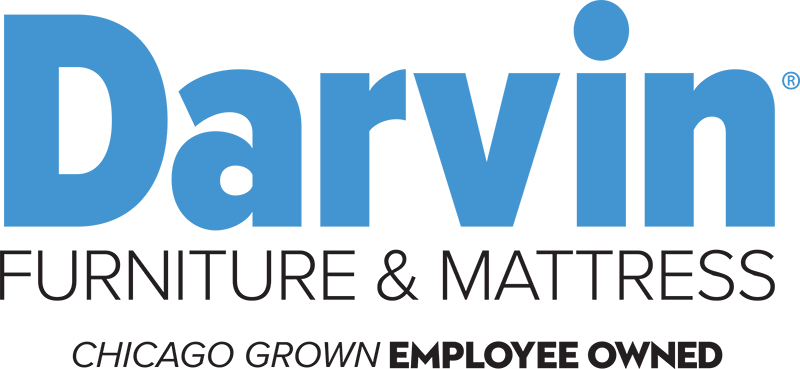

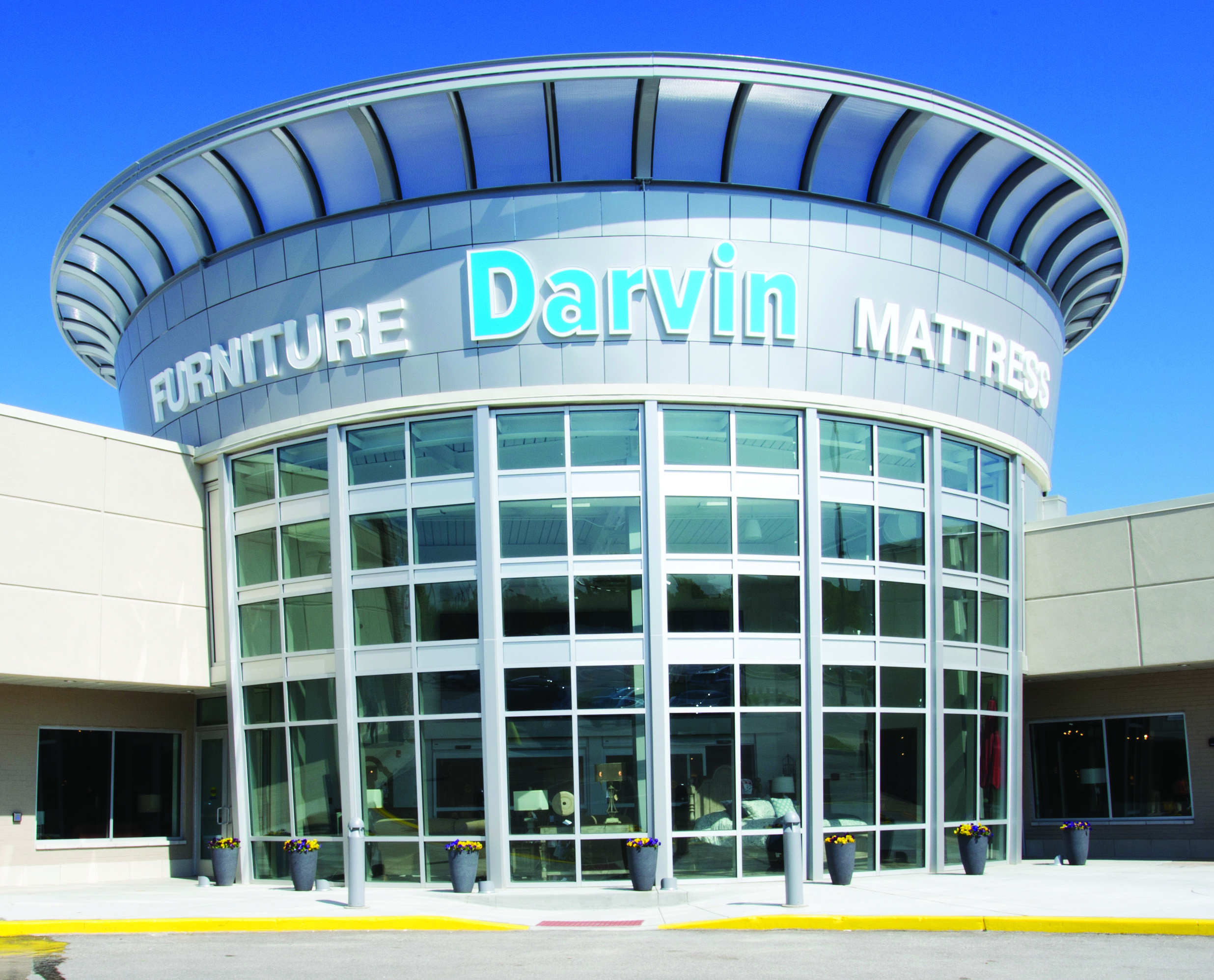
- Darvin Furniture Store in 2018
- Industry: Furniture and Mattress Retail
- Founded: 1920; 106 years ago
- Founder: Louis Darvin
- Headquarters: Orland Park, Illinois, U.S.
- Key people: Will Harris - President; Steven Darvin, Marty Darvin
- Products: Furniture, Mattresses, Rugs
- Revenue: ▲US$ 100 million (2021)
- Number of employees: about 300
- Website: www.darvin.com

Darvin Furniture & Mattress is an American furniture and mattress retailer based in Orland Park, Illinois. Three generations of the Darvin family have owned and operated Chicago metro area's furniture and mattress store. The company was founded by Louis Darvin in 1920 and succeeded by son David Darvin, then by grandsons Steve and Marty Darvin. Under the leadership of Darvin Furniture & Mattress President Will Harris, the retailer is ranked 71st in the Top-100 list of Furniture Retailers in the U.S.

== History ==
In 1920 Louis Darvin began selling furniture door-to-door in Chicago. In 1939, Louis and son, David, opened the first Darvin Furniture store in the West Pullman neighborhood of Chicago with 5,000 square feet (465 m^{2}) and moved to a 25,000-square-foot (2,323 m^{2}) location in Pullman in 1948 before settling into a 50,000-square-foot (4,645 m^{2}) showroom in Chicago's Southside. In the 1970s, David's sons, Steve and Marty, joined the family business, and in 1980 a new facility was built in Orland Park, 25 miles south of downtown Chicago. Five expansions to the facility have been made since 1980. In 2000, Darvin opened its 218,000-square-foot distribution center in Mokena, Illinois, In 2010, a 10,000-square-foot Mattress Gallery was added to the store. An additional 35,000-square-foot Clearance & Outlet Center was added to the second floor of its showroom in 2015. Darvin launched its digital e-commerce platform in 2017, allowing users to purchase merchandise online from home or on the go.

In 2019, Steve and Marty Darvin transitioned the company to employee ownership via an Employee Stock Ownership Plan (ESOP). This plan led to a transition of the management structure that brought Will Harris to run as the company's president. He is the first person outside the family to become the leader of Darvin Furniture. As of 2019, when the company went outside of the family for new leadership in Will Harris, the company was the largest furniture and mattress store in the Chicago area.

== Community ==
Darvin Furniture & Mattress is active in the Chicago giving community, participating with regional charities and helping with local non-profit needs. The company has participated in local fundraising, furniture donation, crisis center support, and support for autistic people.

== Awards and recognition ==
- Top-100 Furniture Retailer, Furniture Today Magazine – 2018
- Accredited by the Better Business Bureau (BBB) – 2018
- City of Hope Honoree
- Illinois Retail Merchants Association Retailer of the Year Award – 2016
- Orland Park Community Pride Award – 2016
- Best Furniture in Northwest Indiana, Northwest Indiana Times – 2012, 2015
- Furniture Today Leadership Award 2018
- Lifetime Achievement - Retail Giant, Furniture Today Magazine – 2021
