= Darwin Glacier (Kenya) =

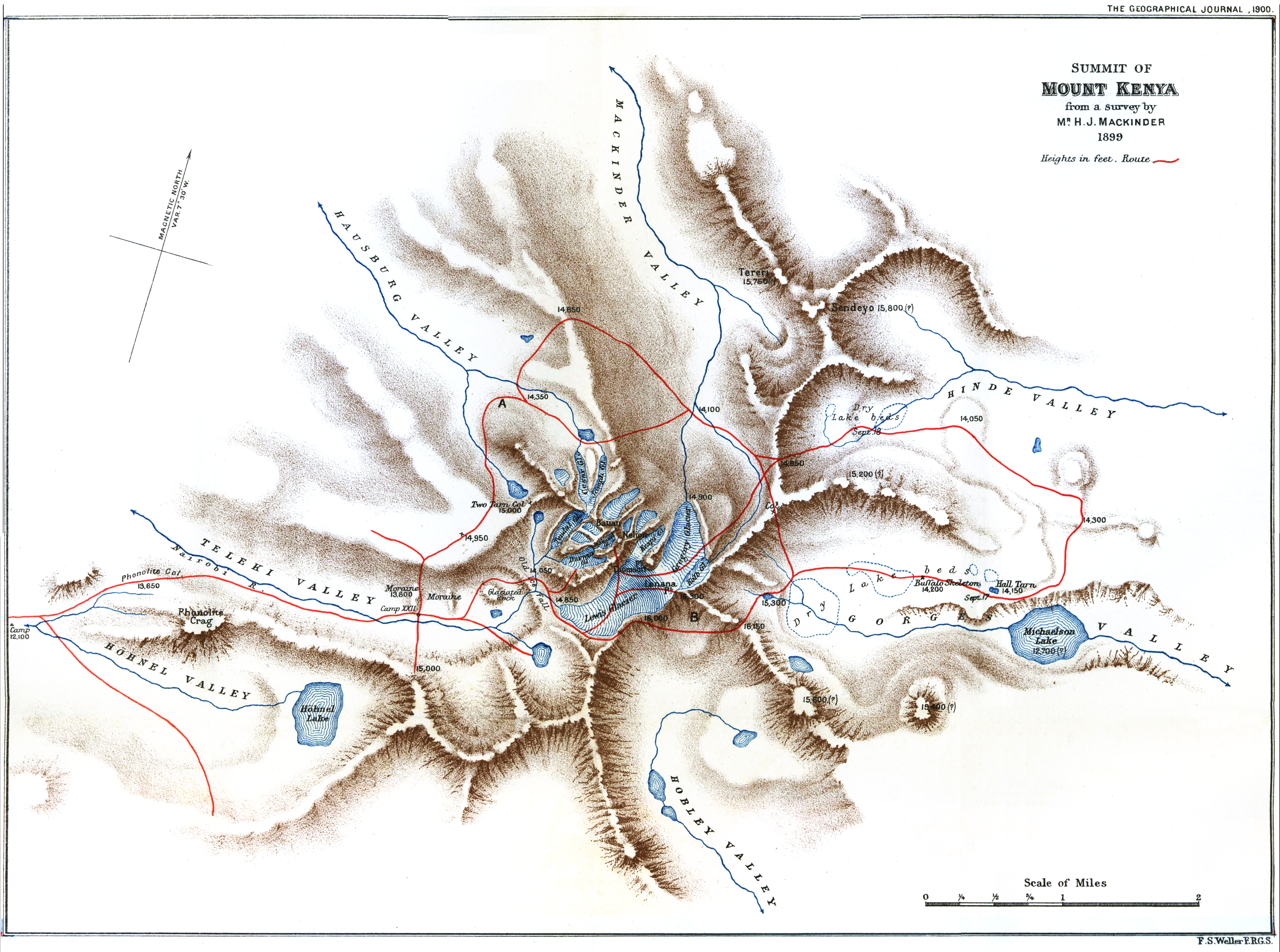
Mount Kenya in 1899 as drawn by Halford Mackinder. Darwin Glacier is shown below Diamond Glacier

Darwin Glacier is a former glacier that was on Mount Kenya. In 1947, the glacier was 260 m long with an area of 40000 sq. m. with the upper end at 4835 m and the lower end at 4620 m above sea level. It was named after Charles Darwin by John Walter Gregory in 1894 "as a reminder that for the first precise description of a glacial valley in England we are indebted to the late Charles Darwin".

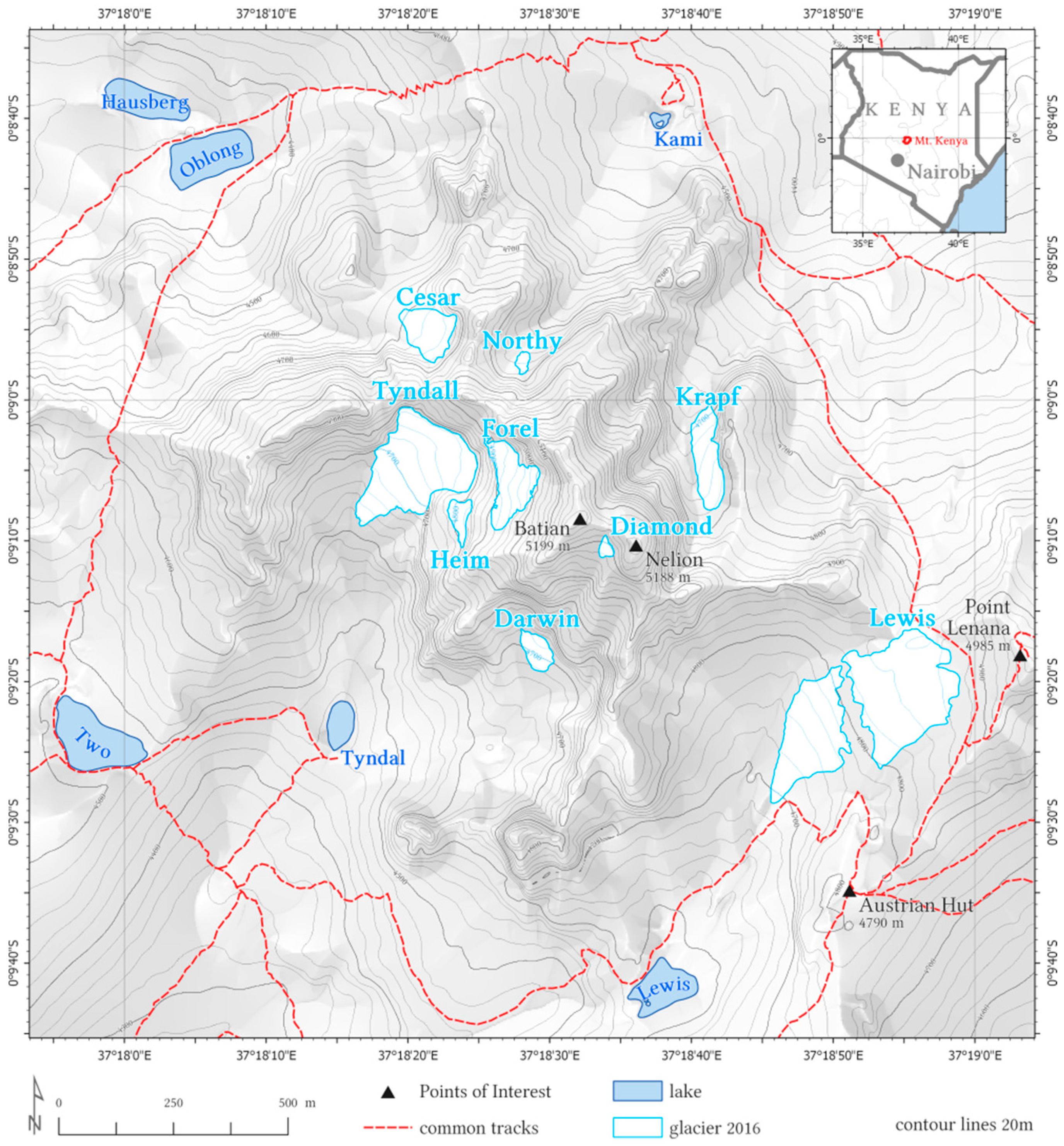
Glacier extents based on satellite imagery in 2016

By 1987 Darwin Glacier had declined in length to 200 m and with just an area of 14000 sq. m. It almost completely vanished by 2016 along with the Northey Glacier and the southeastern part of the Lewis Glacier. Raymond Hook of Nanyuki wrote to Commander P. C. Spink in 1946 that he had measured the retreat of the glacier and found it to be 200 feet in 25 years. The glaciers Barlow and Kolbe had vanished by 1926. Melhuish Glacier vanished in 1978.

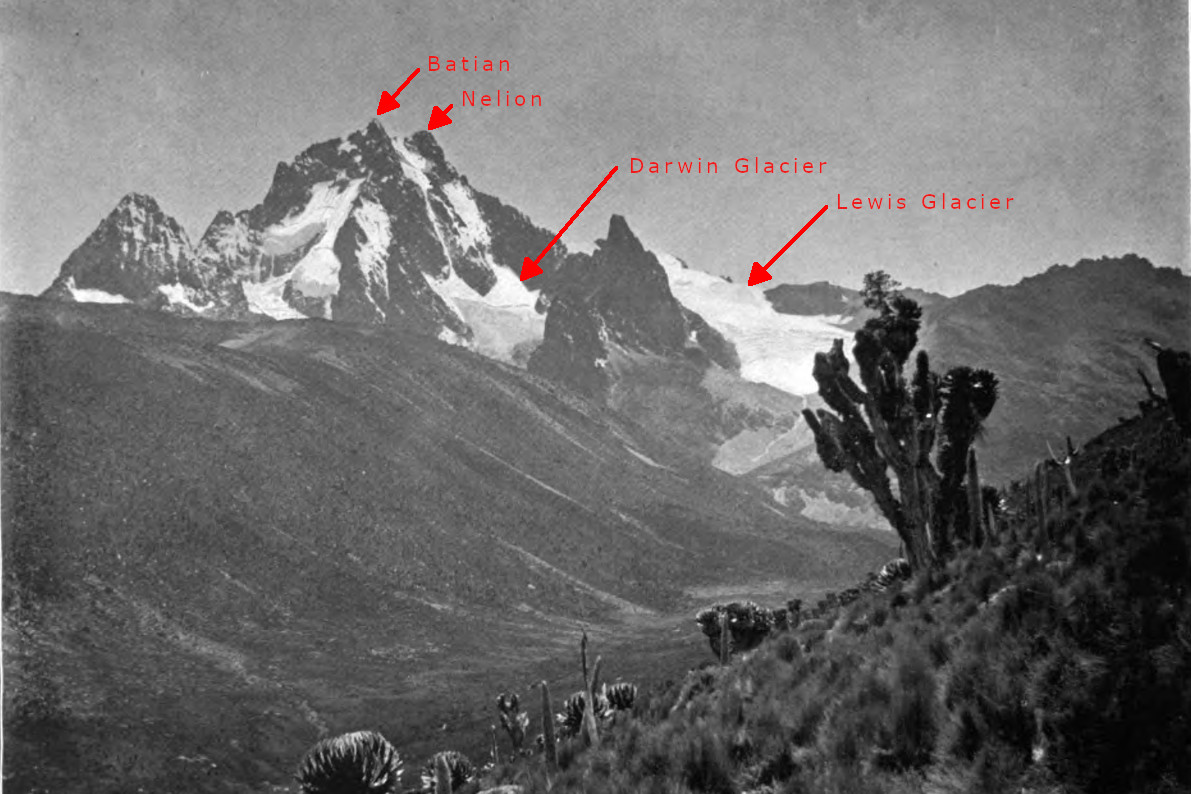
c. 1899

The Darwin Glacier was fed by the Diamond Glacier and Couloir above it. The connection began to break in the 1970s. During 2014-2016 the glacier area on Mt Kenya declined by 44%, with the largest glacier, Lewis, losing 46% of its area and 57% of its volume. It has been estimated that at current rates of glacial retreat, the glaciers on Mount Kenya will be gone by 2030.
