= Darwin Mountains =

Mountain range in Antarctica

ins
- Location within Antarctica

Highest point
- Elevation: 1,900 m (6,200 ft)

Geography
- Continent: Antarctica
- Range coordinates: 79°51′S 156°15′E
- Parent range: Transantarctic Mountains

The Darwin Mountains (79°51′S 156°15′E) are a group of mountains between the Darwin Glacier and Hatherton Glacier in Antarctica. They were discovered by the British National Antarctic Expedition (1901–04) and named for Major Leonard Darwin, at that time Honorary Secretary of the Royal Geographical Society. They are south of the Cook Mountains and north of the Britannia Range

== Location ==
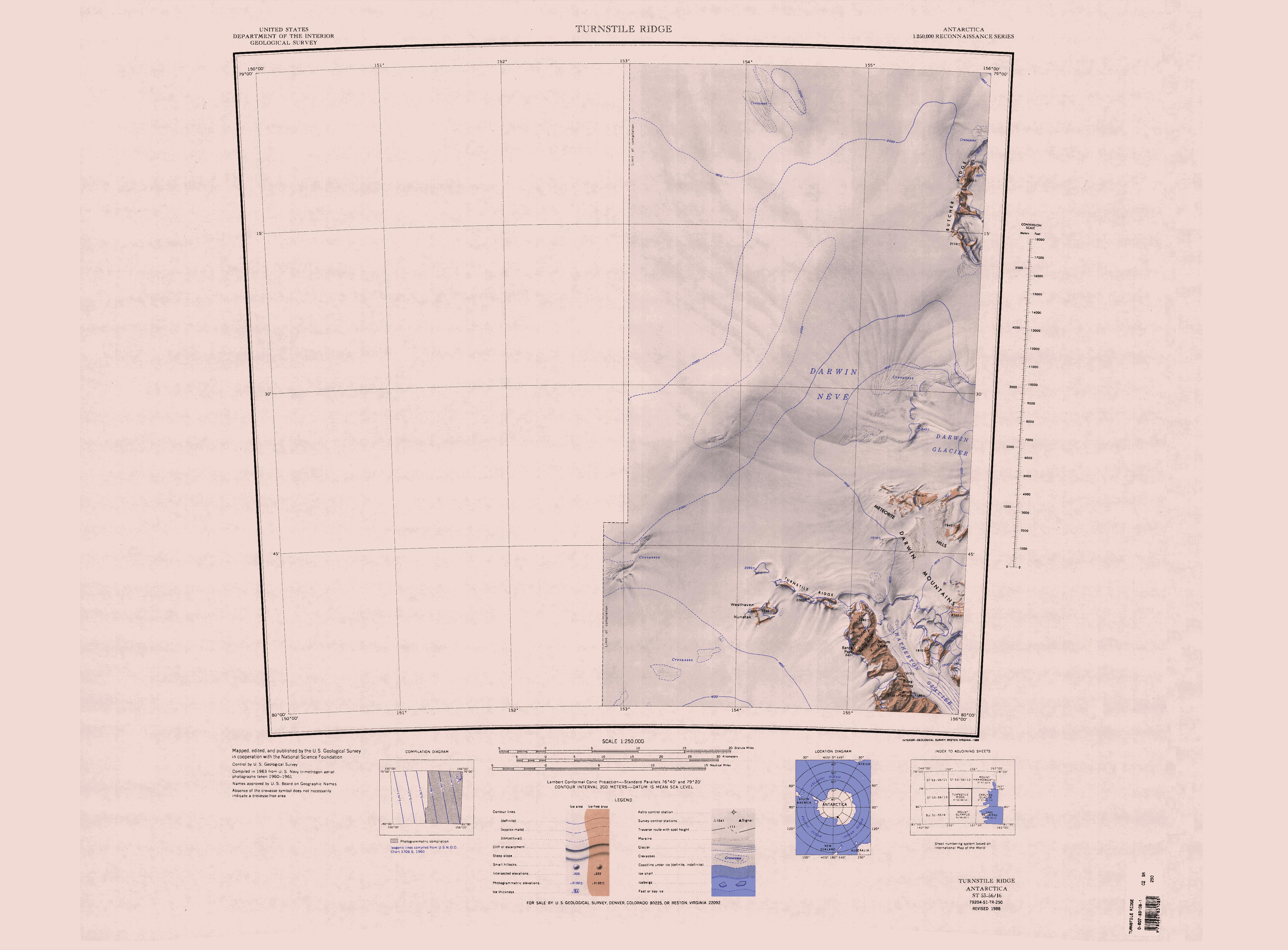
Western Darwin Mountains in southeast of map

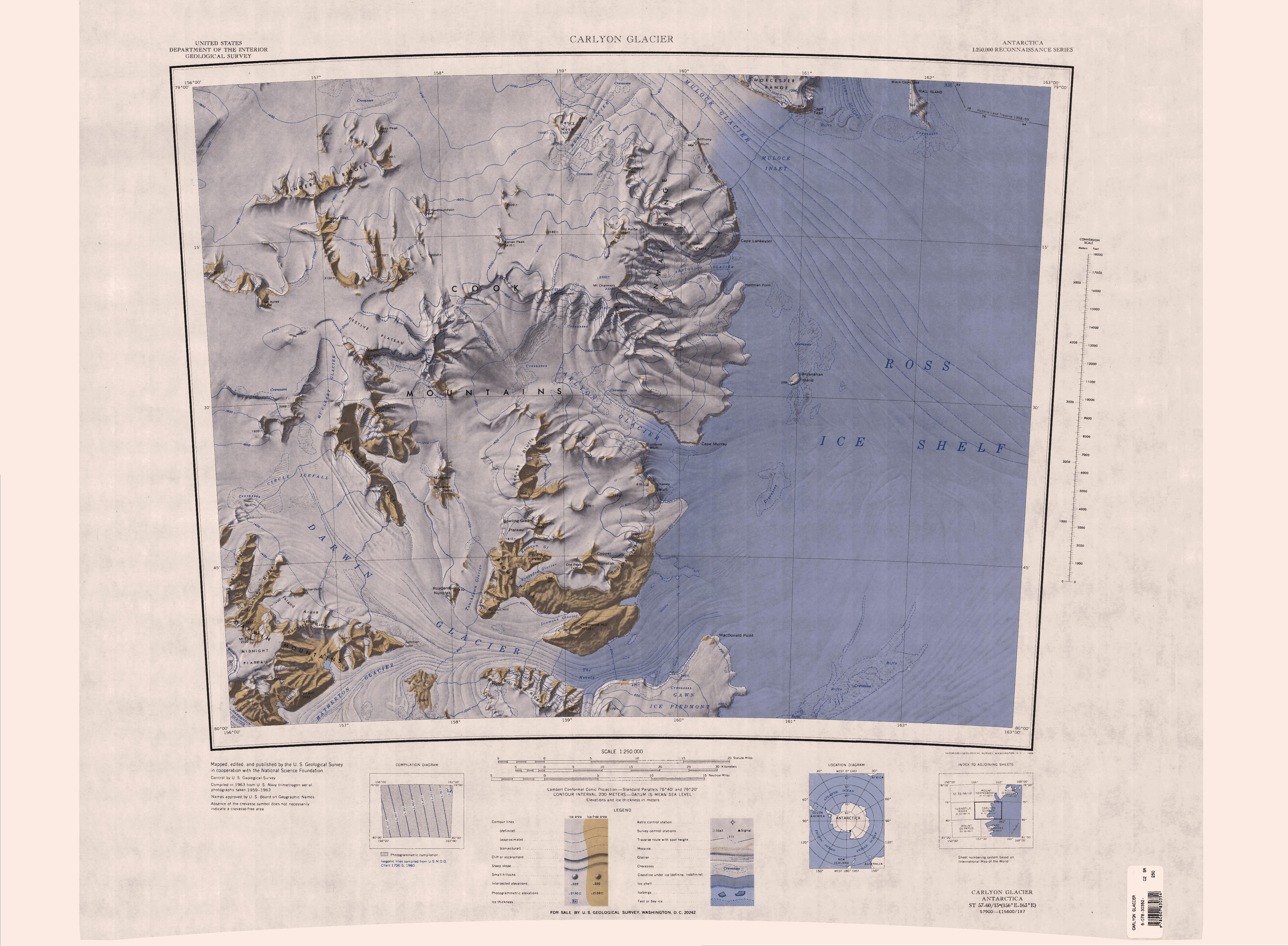
Eastern Darwin Mountains in southwest of map

The Darwin Mountains are bounded by the Hatherton Glacier which flows southeast past its west side, then turns and flows northeast past Junction Spur at the eastern tip of the mountains to join Darwin Glacier. Darwin Glacier defines the northeast and north boundary of the mountains. Darwin Névé lies to the west. The Meteorite Hills are the western end of the mountains. Further east the Haskell Ridge and Colosseum Ridge extend into Darwin Glacier. Mount Ellis rises about the Midnight Plateau. Mount Ash overlooks the lower Hatherton Glacier. In the northeast Kennett Ridge rises above the Island Arena and Richardson Hill.

== Southern features ==
=== Scheuermann Spur ===
79.85°S 155.5833333°E. A broad ice-covered limb of the Darwin Mountains between the head of the Hatherton Glacier and the west end of Prebble Icefalls. The feature has a relatively flat summit area about 1,600 metres (5,200 ft) high that tapers southward to a narrow snout. A rock cliff marks the west side facing Hatherton Glacier. Named after Mike Scheuermann, Air Projects Specialist, Office of Polar Programs, NSF, 1995-2001; former Navy liaison to OPP from United States Navy.

=== Harvey Cirque ===
79.9°S 155.8666667°E. A cirque containing a small glacier between Scheuermann Spur and Corell Cirque in the south part of the Darwin Mountains. The cirque occurs along the extensive Prebble Icefalls which contributes some ice to the head of the cirque; there is limited flow from the cirque to Hatherton Glacier. Named after geologist Ralph P. Harvey of Case Western Reserve University, Cleveland, OH, engaged in the United States Antarctic Project (United States ArmyP) Antarctic Search for Meteorites in the Transantarctic Mountains for many austral summers, 1992-2001, ultimately as ANSMET principal investigator.

=== Corell Cirque ===
79.9°S 155.95°E. A large cirque containing a glacier between Harvey Cirque and Duncan Bluff in the south part of the Darwin Mountains. Located at the east end of the extensive Prebble Icefalls, the cirque channels some of the ice from the Midnight Plateau icecap into the Hatherton Glacier. Named after Robert Corell, who headed the Geosciences Directorate at the NSF, 1987-99, which for many years included the Foundation's Polar Research, and chaired national and international groups evaluating global change.

=== Duncan Bluff ===
79.95°S 155.9666667°E. A steep rock bluff along the north side of Hatherton Glacier. It rises to 1,800 metres (5,900 ft) high between Corell Cirque and Conant Valley in the Darwin Mountains. In association with the names of communication workers grouped in this area, named after Patrick Duncan Smith of the Office of Polar Programs, NSF, 1995-2001, information technology specialist for the United States Antarctic Project (United States ArmyP) with responsibility for projects that access communication satellites as well as Antarctic communication with the outside world.

=== Conant Valley ===
79.95°S 156.05°E. A valley between Duncan Bluff and Communication Heights in the south part of Darwin Mountains. The valley mouth opens to Hatherton Glacier. Named after Neil Conant, communications operator in support of the United States Antarctic Project (United States ArmyP) in 15 austral summers, 1984-2001; three summers were at Siple Station in the 1980s, the remainder at South Pole Station.

=== Grant Valley ===
79.9666667°S 156.4166667°E. A valley between Communication Heights and Mount Ash in the Darwin Mountains. A lobe of ice from Hatherton Glacier occupies the mouth of the valley. Named after Bettie Kathryn (B.K.) Grant, Information Systems Supervisor at South Pole Station. She made 11 deployments to Antarctica, 1990-2001, the last 10 to South Pole Station where she wintered, 1993.

=== Mount Ash ===
79°57′S 156°39′E. Mountain, 2,025 metres (6,644 ft) high, overlooking the north side of Hatherton Glacier 11 nautical miles (20 km; 13 mi) west-southwest of Junction Spur. Mapped by the USGS from tellurometer surveys and Navy air photos, 1959-63. Named by US-ACAN for Ralph E. Ash, mechanic, a member of the United States McMurdo-Pole traverse party, 1960-61.

== Northern features ==
Northern features, from west to east, include:

=== Haskell Ridge ===
79°44′S 156°10′E. A rocky ridge 2 nautical miles (3.7 km; 2.3 mi) west of Colosseum Ridge. Mapped by the VUWAE (1962-63) and named after T.R. Haskell, a member of the expedition.

=== Misthound Cirque ===
79°46′S 156°12′E. A cirque forming a large embayment in the east side of Haskell Ridge. It is the type locality for the Misthound Coal measures, a formation of the Beacon Sequence. So named by VUWAE, 1962-63, because of the eerie bleakness and often mist-filled floor of the cirque, which contains many peculiarly shaped boulders resembling large dogs.

=== Muchmore Valley ===
79.7666667°S 156.25°E A valley 6 nautical miles (11 km; 6.9 mi) long between Haskell Ridge and Colosseum Ridge. The valley is filled by ice except at the head, where flow from the Midnight Plateau icecap is insufficient to enter the valley. Named after Doctor Harold G. Muchmore of the Oklahoma Medical Research Foundation, Oklahoma City, OK, field leader for a long term project on biomedical aspects of human adaptation at the South Pole, 1970-83.

=== Colosseum Ridge ===
79°47′S 156°20′E. A ridge between Haskell Ridge and Richardson Hill. The ridge contains pyramidal peaks and five large cirques, the appearance of the latter bearing a resemblance to the Colosseum in Rome. Mapped and named by the VUWAE (1962-63).

=== Richardson Hill ===
79°48′S 156°40′E. An ice-free hill which rises above the ice of Island Arena on the north side of the Darwin Mountains. Mapped and named by the VUWAE (1962-63), for Professor L.R. Richardson of the Victoria University of Wellington, N.Z., an active supporter of the University's Antarctic expeditions.

=== Smith Heights ===
79°52′S 157°07′E. The highest part of the jumble of peaks between Kennett Ridge and Junction Spur in the eastern part of the Darvin Mountains. Mapped by the VUWAE, 1962-63, and named for G.J. Smith, a member of the expedition.

=== Junction Spur ===
79°53′S 157°29′E. A rocky spur marking the eastern extremity of the Darwin Mountains and the junction of the Hatherton and Darwin Glaciers. Mapped and named by the Darwin Glacier Party of the CTAE (1956-58).

== Sources ==
- Alberts, Fred G., ed. (1995), Geographic Names of the Antarctic (PDF) (2 ed.), United States Board on Geographic Names This article incorporates public domain material from websites or documents of the United States Board on Geographic Names.
- Carlyon Glacier, USGS United States Geologic Survey, 1960
- "Conant Valley", Geographic Names Information System, United States Geological Survey, United States Department of the Interior
- "Corell Cirque", Geographic Names Information System, United States Geological Survey, United States Department of the Interior
- "Duncan Bluff", Geographic Names Information System, United States Geological Survey, United States Department of the Interior
- "Grant Valley", Geographic Names Information System, United States Geological Survey, United States Department of the Interior
- "Harvey Cirque", Geographic Names Information System, United States Geological Survey, United States Department of the Interior
- "Muchmore Valley", Geographic Names Information System, United States Geological Survey, United States Department of the Interior
- "Scheuermann Spur", Geographic Names Information System, United States Geological Survey, United States Department of the Interior
- Turnstyle Ridge, USGS United States Geologic Survey, 1963

This article incorporates public domain material from websites or documents of the United States Geological Survey.
