= Tentacle Ridge =

Tentacle Ridge (79°37′S 157°15′E) is a long partially ice-free ridge lying south of Mount Longhurst, extending from the mouth of McCleary Glacier southeast along the north side of Darwin Glacier. The descriptive name was given by the Darwin Glacier Party of the Commonwealth Trans-Antarctic Expedition (1956–58).
