= Darwin Glacier (Antarctica) =

Glacier in Antarctica

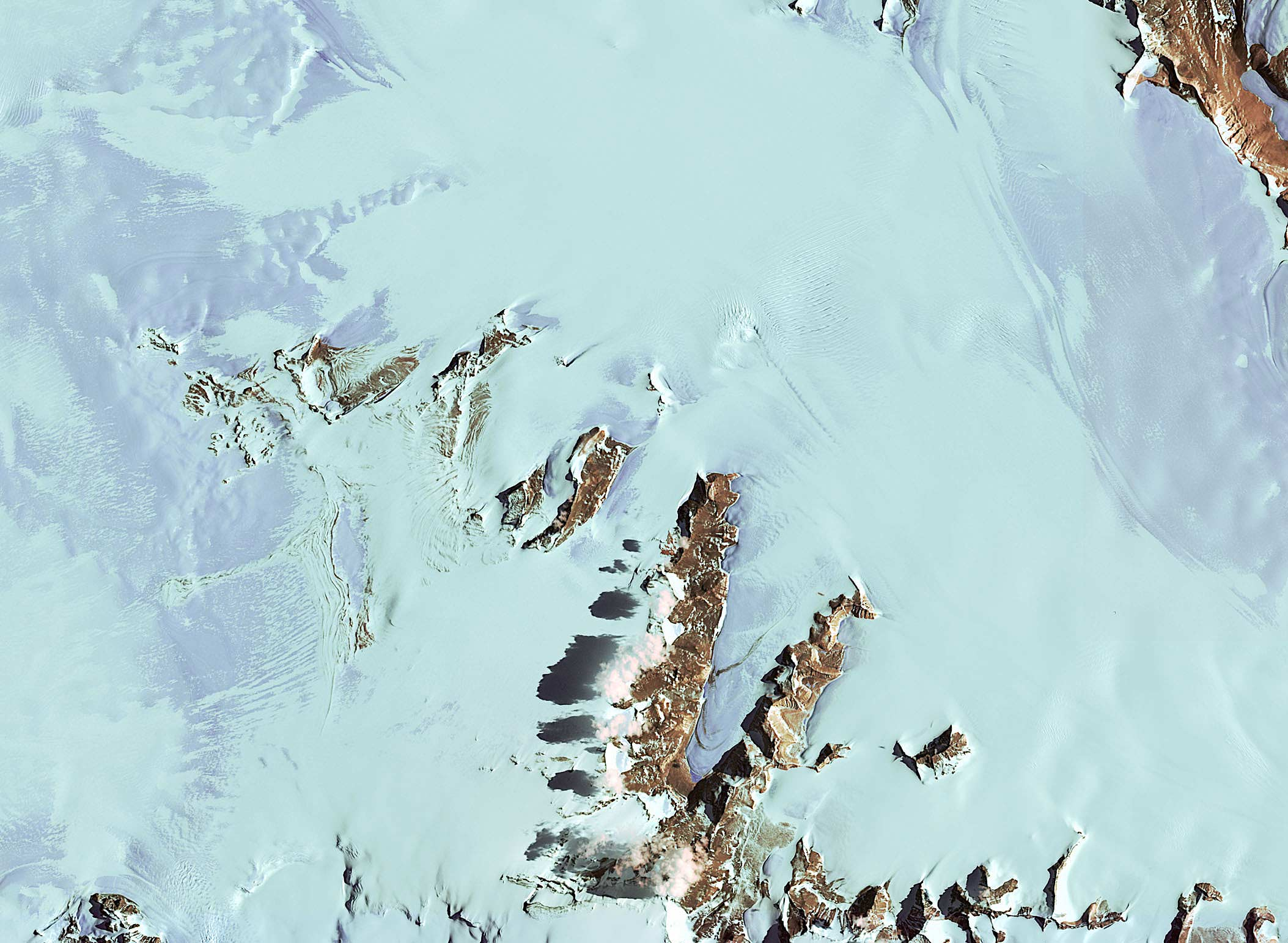
- Satellite view of Antarctica showing part of Darwin Glacier

- Location within Antarctica
- Location: Ross Dependency
- Coordinates: 79°53′S 159°00′E
- Thickness: unknown
- Terminus: Ross Ice Shelf
- Status: unknown

The Darwin Glacier (79°53′S 159°00′E) is a large glacier in Antarctica. It flows from the polar plateau eastward between the Darwin Mountains and the Cook Mountains to the Ross Ice Shelf. The Darwin and its major tributary the Hatherton are often treated as one system, the Darwin–Hatherton.

== Early exploration and naming ==
The lower part of the glacier was mapped by the British National Antarctic Expedition, 1901–04 (BrNAE), and the whole area traversed by New Zealand parties of the Commonwealth Trans-Antarctic Expedition (1956–58). The glacier was named in association with the Darwin Mountains.

== Glaciology ==
The Darwin Glacier flows relatively slowly compared to other glaciers in the Transantarctic Mountains, at less than 100 metres (330 ft) per year. There are small scale fluctuations due to daily tidal cycles downstream from its grounding line. During the Last Glacial Maximum (LGM) the Antarctic ice sheet expanded, forming grounded ice in the Ross Sea. This would cause the ice streams flowing into the Ross Sea to be buttressed and thickened, and there is some evidence to support this. However, there is contradictory evidence from the upper Hatherton Glacier that suggests the ice extent there was lower in the LGM than it is today.

Darwin and Hatherton glaciers both thinned steadily by about 500 metres (1,600 ft) during the last deglaciation between 9,000 and 3,000 years ago. It seems that they lost about half their catchment area to the Byrd Glacier and/or Mulock Glacier, and also that convergent ice flowing from the Byrd and Mulock glaciers strongly buttresses the Darwin and Hatherton glaciers.

== Course ==
The Darwin Glacier originates in the Darwin Névé, on the west rim of the polar plateau. It flows east past the Meteorite Hills of the Darwin Mountains to the south. It turns to flow southeast past the Darwin Mountains to the southwest and the Brown Hills of the Cook Mountains to the north. McCleary Glacier drains southward into Darwin Glacier east of Walker Cirque and just west of Tentacle Ridge. It is joined from the north by the Touchdown Glacier between Roadend Nunatak and the Brown Hills. The Diamond Glacier is a reentrant from the Darwin Glacier north into the Brown Hills.

The Hatherton Glacier forms south of the head of the Darwin Glacier, below Turnstile Ridge, and flows southeast. The Lieske Glacier and Hinton Glacier enter the Hatherton Glacier from the south on either side of Dusky Ridge. The Ragotzkie Glacier enters the Hatherton Glacier to the southwest of Junction Spur. The Hatherton Glacier, which has turned to flow northeast, joins the Darwin Glacier east of Junction Spur. The Darwin Glacier flows east through The Nozzle between Diamond Hill to the north and the Gawn Ice Piedmont to the south to enter the Ross Ice Shelf north of MacDonald Point.

== Head ==
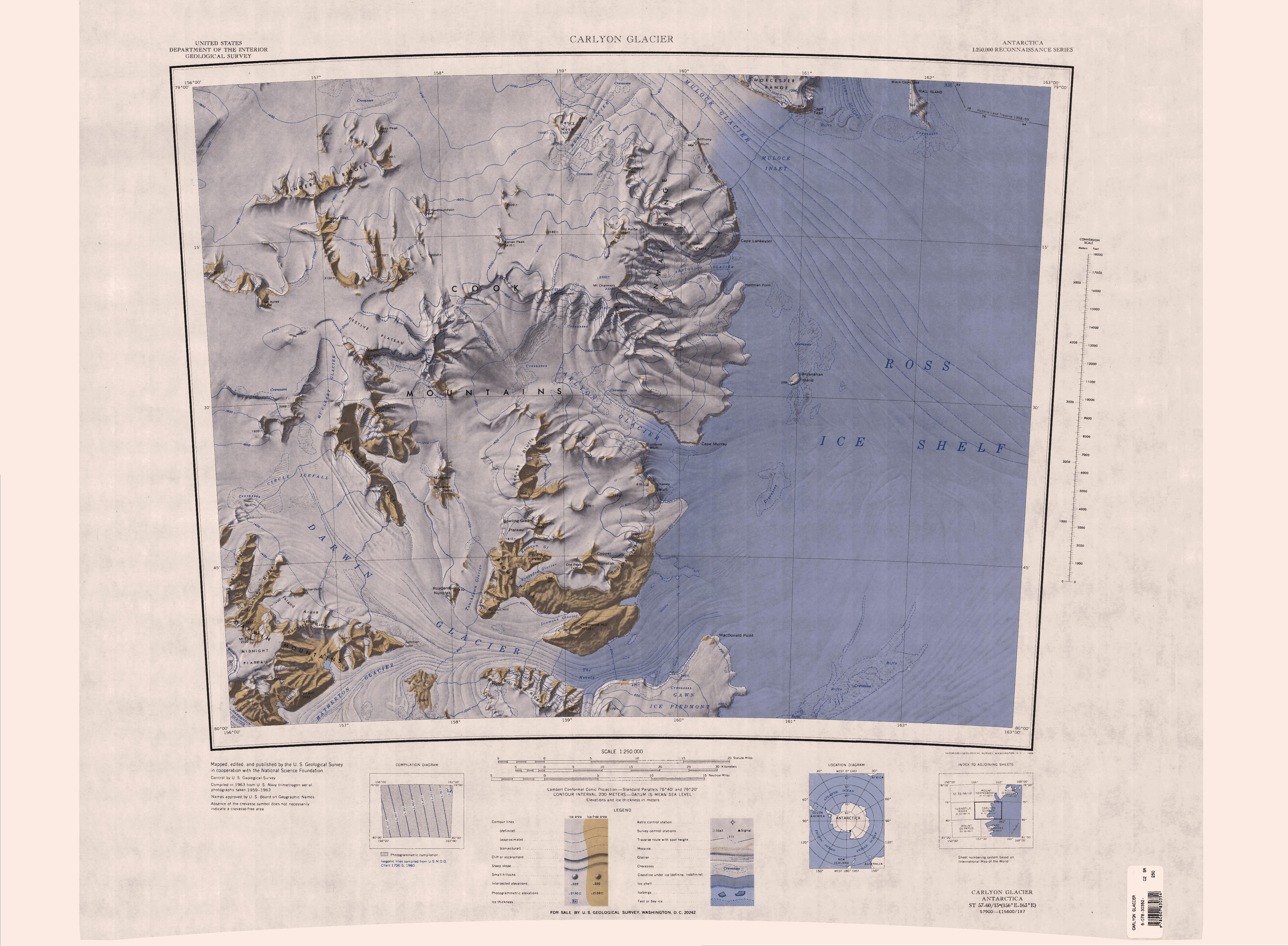
Darwin Glacier in the southwest of the map

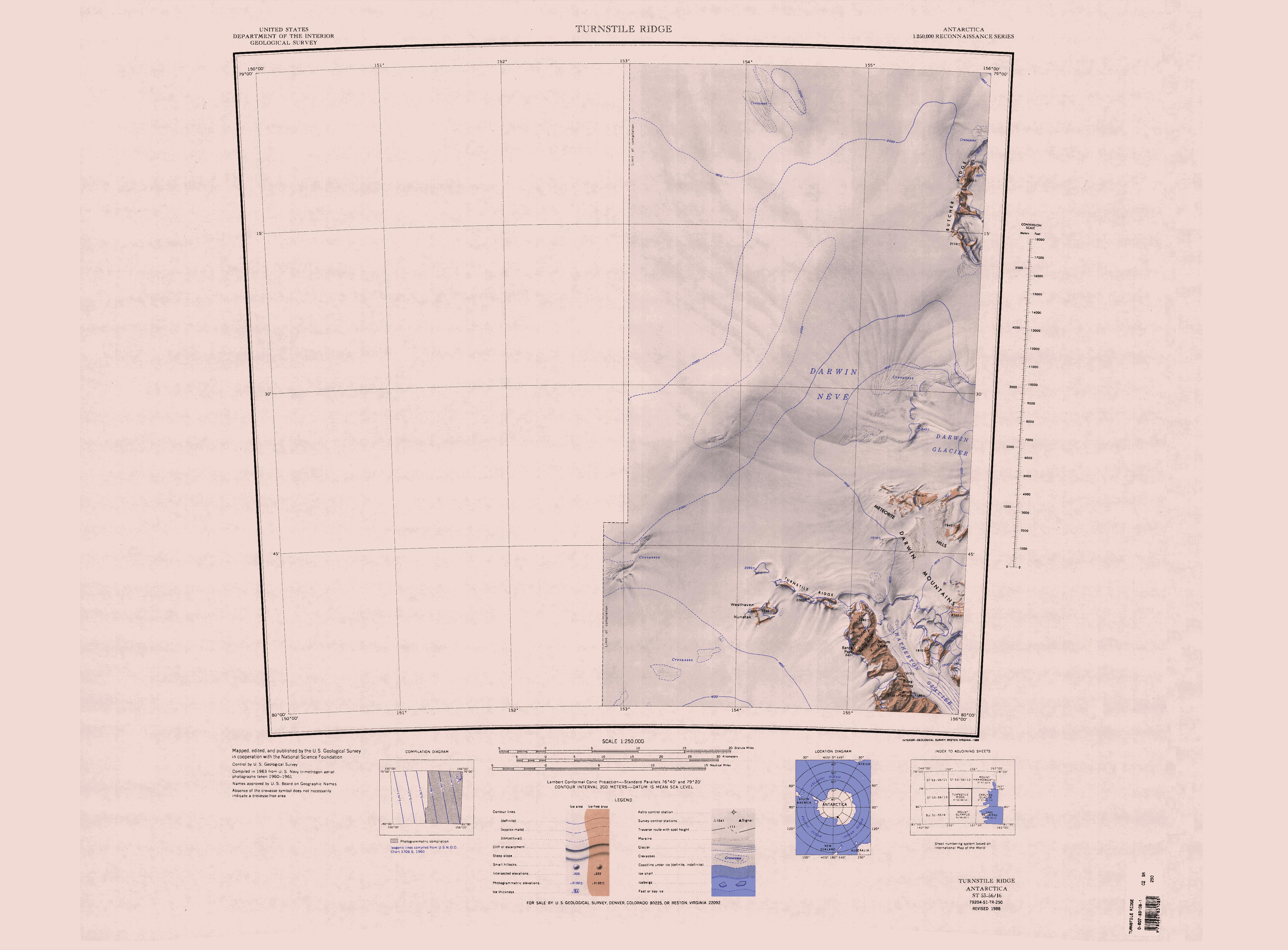
Head of the Darwin Glacier

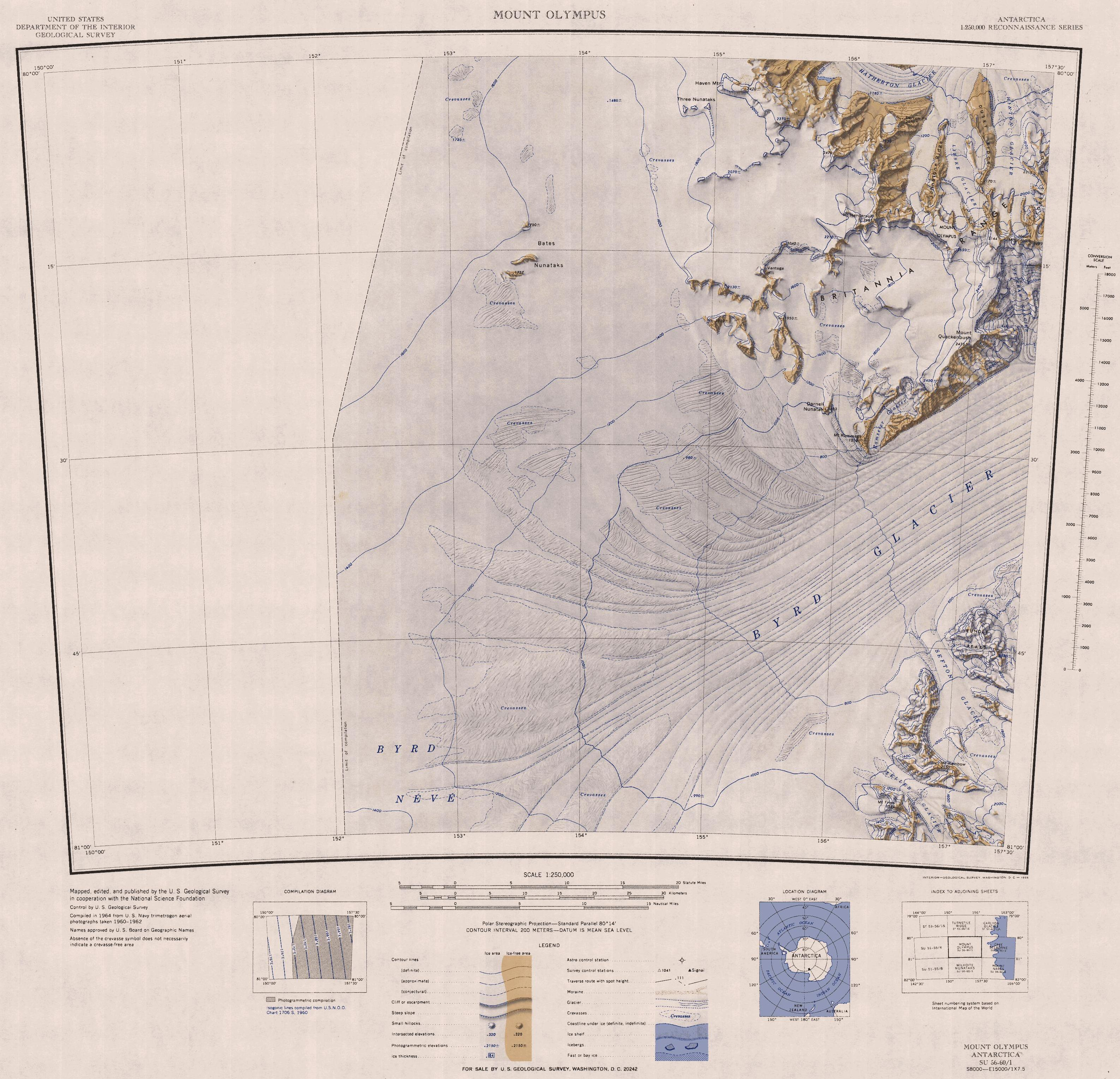
South of the head

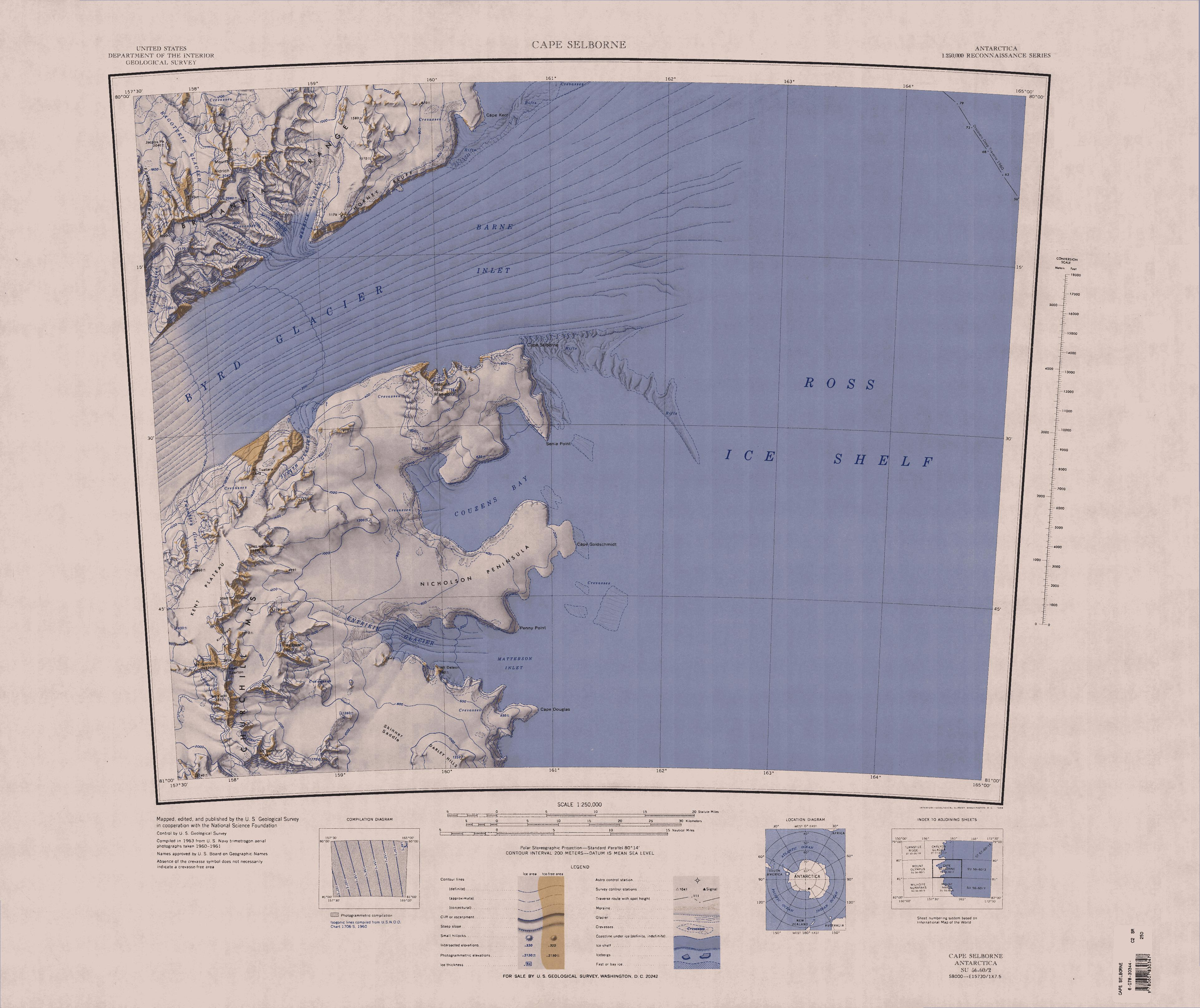
South of the mouth

=== Darwin Névé ===
79°30′S 155°00′E. A large névé on the west side of the Cook and Darwin Mountains which feeds the Darwin and Hatherton Glaciers. Named for its association with Darwin Glacier by the N.Z. Darwin Glacier Party of the CTAE, 1956-58.

=== Circle Icefall ===
79°38′S 156°30′E. An almost impenetrable icefall near Tentacle Ridge, 45 metres (148 ft) high and 15 nautical miles (28 km; 17 mi) long, extending in an arc for almost the whole width across the Darwin Glacier. Named by the Darwin Glacier Party of the Commonwealth Trans-Antarctic Expedition (CTAE) (1956–58) for its similarity to the circle of an opera house.

== Tributaries ==
=== Green Glacier ===
79°43′S 156°10′E. Glacier on the west side of Haskell Ridge, flowing north from the Darwin Mountains into Darwin Glacier. Mapped by the Darwin Glacier Party of the CTAE, 1956–58, who named it because of the green color of its surface.

=== McCleary Glacier ===
79°33′S 156°50′E. A broad glacier about 10 nautical miles (19 km; 12 mi) long, draining southward into Darwin Glacier just west of Tentacle Ridge. Mapped by the United States Geological Survey (USGS) from tellurometer surveys and Navy air photos, 1959-63. Named by the Advisory Committee on Antarctic Names (US-ACAN) for George McCleary, public information officer on the staff of the U.S. Antarctic Projects Officer (1959–61), whose labors helped to start the Bulletin of the USAPO.

=== Touchdown Glacier ===
79°48′S 158°10′E. A tributary of Darwin Glacier, flowing south between Roadend Nunatak and the Brown Hills. Mapped by the VUWAE (1962–63) and so named because the glacier was used as a landing site for aircraft supporting the expedition.

=== Diamond Glacier ===
79°51′S 159°00′E A small distributary glacier of the Darwin Glacier, flowing east-northeast into the narrow valley on the north side of Diamond Hill. Mapped by the VUWAE (1962–63) and named after Diamond Hill.

=== Hatherton Glacier ===
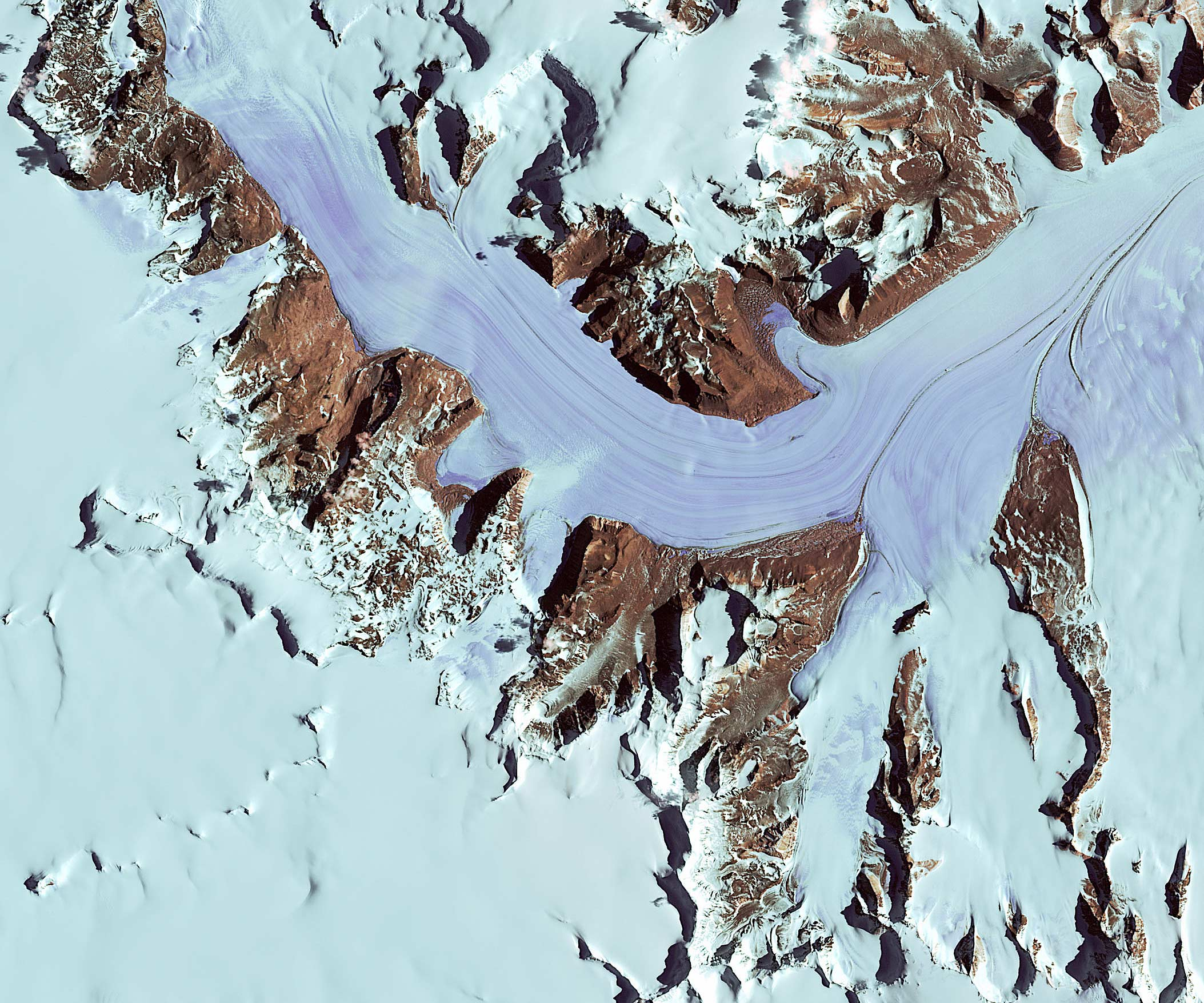
Hatherton Glacier

79°55′S 157°35′E. A large glacier flowing from the polar plateau generally eastward along the south side of the Darwin Mountains and entering Darwin Glacier at Junction Spur. Mapped by the Darwin Glacier Party of the CTAE (1956–58). Named for Trevor Hatherton, Scientific Officer in Charge of Antarctic Activities, Dept. of Scientific and Industrial Research, Wellington, New Zealand.

=== Overturn Glacier ===
79.9°S 157.25°E. A short tributary glacier of the Hatherton Glacier 3.6 nautical miles (6.7 km; 4.1 mi) west of Junction Spur in the Darwin Mountains. The glacier is steep without crevasses. Named by the members of a New Zealand Antarctic Research Program (NZARP) field group who had a dramatic overturn with their toboggan while driving down the glacier.

=== McCraw Glacier ===
79°07′S 156°35′E. Glacier in the Britannia Range, draining the northwest slopes of Mount Olympus and flowing north, westward of Johnstone Ridge, to enter Hatherton Glacier. Named by a University of Waikato geological party, 1978–79, led by M.J. Selby. Named for John D. McCraw, Dean of Science, University of Waikato, Hamilton, N.Z., a member on a 1959-60 field party to the McMurdo Dry Valleys.

=== Lieske Glacier ===
79°05′S 156°50′E. A tributary glacier draining the north slopes of Mount Olympus in Britannia Range and flowing north between Johnstone and Dusky Ridges into Hatherton Glacier. Named by the US-ACAN for Bruce J. Lieske, meteorologist who wintered at Little America V in 1957.

=== Hinton Glacier ===
79°03′S 157°10′E. A tributary glacier in the Britannia Range, flowing north between Forbes Ridge and Dusky Ridge into Hatherton Glacier. Named by US-ACAN for Chief Construction Mechanic Clarence C. Hinton, Jr., USN. Hinton wintered at McMurdo Station, 1963, and headed a team charged with the maintenance of mechanical equipment at the outlying U.S. stations.

=== Ragotzkie Glacier ===
79°02′S 157°45′E. A glacier in the Britannia Range, about 10 nautical miles (19 km; 12 mi) long, flowing northward along the west side of Mount Aldrich and coalescing with other north-flowing glaciers which enter the Hatherton Glacier to the southwest of Junction Spur. Named by US-ACAN for Robert A. Ragotzkie, project director for United States Antarctic Program (USARP) studies of lakes in the ice-free valleys. He made personal studies in Victoria Land in the 1962-63 season.

=== Ragotzkie Icefall ===
80°03′S 158°00′E An icefall 2.5 nautical miles (4.6 km; 2.9 mi) wide in the east-central part of Ragotzkie Glacier. The icefall is a significant distributary of Ragotzkie ice to Alley Glacier, which occupies the valley to the east. Named by US-ACAN in association with Ragotzkie Glacier.

=== Alley Glacier ===
79.9666667°S 158.0833333°E A glacier that drains the north slopes of Britannia Range in the vicinity of Ward Tower and flows north to Darwin Glacier. Named by Advisory Committee on Antarctic Names (US-ACAN) after Richard B. Alley, Department of Geosciences, Pennsylvania State University, U.S. Antarctic Project (USAP) glaciologist who has specialized in the study of ice streams of the West Antarctic Ice Sheet.

== Other features ==
=== Walker Cirque ===
79.5333333°S 156.5166667°E Description: A prominent glacier-filled cirque at the west side of the terminus of McCleary Glacier in Cook Mountains. The cirque opens to Darwin Glacier near the head. Named after Carlton Walker, Facilities, Maintenance, and Construction Supervisor at South Pole Station during U.S. Antarctic Project (USAP) South Pole Station Modernization.

=== Roadend Nunatak ===
79°48′S 158°02′E. A conspicuous nunatak 4 nautical miles (7.4 km; 4.6 mi) west-northwest of Bastion Hill along the north side of Darwin Glacier. So named by the Victoria University of Wellington Antarctic Expedition (VUWAE) (1962–63) because of its use as a landmark for manhauling sledge journeys and aircraft flights which supported the expedition and landed there.

=== Island Arena ===
79°49′S 156°35′E. A broad valley occupied by a lateral lobe of the Darwin Glacier, indenting the north side of the Darwin Mountains between Colosseum Ridge and Kenneth Ridge. An islandlike nunatak, Richardson Hill, rises above the ice of the valley. The descriptive name was given by the VUWAE (1962–63).

=== Turnstile Ridge ===
79°50′S 154°36′E. A ridge about 9 nautical miles (17 km; 10 mi) long, lying 3 nautical miles (5.6 km; 3.5 mi) north of Westhaven Nunatak at the northwest extremity of Britannia Range. So named by the Darwin Glacier Party (1957) of the CTAE because snow passages resembling turnstiles occur throughout its length.

=== Junction Spur ===
79°53′S 157°29′E. A rocky spur marking the eastern extremity of the Darwin Mountains and the junction of the Hatherton and Darwin Glaciers. Mapped and named by the Darwin Glacier Party of the CTAE (1956–58).

=== The Nozzle ===
79°55′S 159°05′E. A comparatively narrow constriction through which the lower Darwin Glacier flows, causing the ice to bank up somewhat in the vicinity of Diamond Hill. The descriptive name was given by the Darwin Glacier Party of the CTAE (1956–58).

=== Cranfield Icefalls ===
79°56′S 158°40′E. A series of about eight spectacular icefalls, in an east-west line, falling steeply from Bucknell Ridge into the narrowest portion of Darwin Glacier near its mouth. Named by the Darwin Glacier Party of the CTAE (1956–58) for W.J. Cranfield, a member of the party.

=== Gawn Ice Piedmont ===
79°58′S 160°12′E. An ice piedmont and snow slope occupying the coastal platform between Darwin Glacier and Byrd Glacier. Named by the Darwin Glacier Party of the CTAE (1956–58) for J.E. Gawn, radio operator at Scott Base who worked closely with the field parties.

=== MacDonald Point ===
79°52′S 160°20′E. A coastal point with some rocky exposures at the south side of the mouth of Darwin Glacier, where the latter flows into Ross Ice Shelf. Mapped by the USGS from tellurometer surveys and Navy air photos, 1959-63. Named by US-ACAN for James H. (Scot) MacDonald, journalist who as a member of U.S. Navy Squadron VX-6 worked several seasons at McMurdo Station between 1958 and 1961.

== Sources ==
- Alberts, Fred G., ed. (1995), Geographic Names of the Antarctic (PDF) (2 ed.), United States Board on Geographic Names This article incorporates public domain material from websites or documents of the United States Board on Geographic Names.
- "Alley Glacier", Geographic Names Information System, United States Geological Survey, United States Department of the Interior
- Cape Selborne, USGS: United States Geological Survey
- Carlyon Glacier, USGS: United States Geological Survey
- King, Courtney; Hall, Brenda; Hillebrand, Trevor; Stone, John (2018), Hatherton & Darwin Glacier, Antarctica 2014 – 2015, University of Maine
- Hillebrand, Trevor R.; Stone, John O.; Koutnik, Michelle; King, Courtney; Howard Conway; Brenda Hall; Keir Nichols; Brent Goehring; Mette K. Gillespie (2021), "Holocene thinning of Darwin and Hatherton glaciers, Antarctica and implications for grounding-line retreat in the Ross Sea", The Cryosphere, 15 (7): 3329–3354, Bibcode:2021TCry...15.3329H, doi:10.5194/tc-15-3329-2021
- Mount Olympus, USGS: United States Geological Survey
- "Overturn Glacier", Geographic Names Information System, United States Geological Survey, United States Department of the Interior
- "Ragotzkie Icefall", Gazetteer, AADC: Australian Antarctic Data Centre
- Scheffler, Ekkehard (2017), Tide induced velocity fluctuations in the grounding zone of Darwin Glacier, Antarctica, Revealed by GNSS and SAR satellite data (thesis), University of Canterbury, doi:10.26021/6188
- Turnstile Ridge, USGS: United States Geological Survey, 1988
- "Walker Cirque", Geographic Names Information System, United States Geological Survey, United States Department of the Interior
- This article incorporates public domain material from websites or documents of the United States Geological Survey.
