= Westgard =

Westgard may refer to

- Westgard (surname)
- Westgard Pass in California, U.S.
- Westgard Rules for laboratory quality control
