= Cloudripper =

Mountain peak of the Sierra Nevada in California, United States

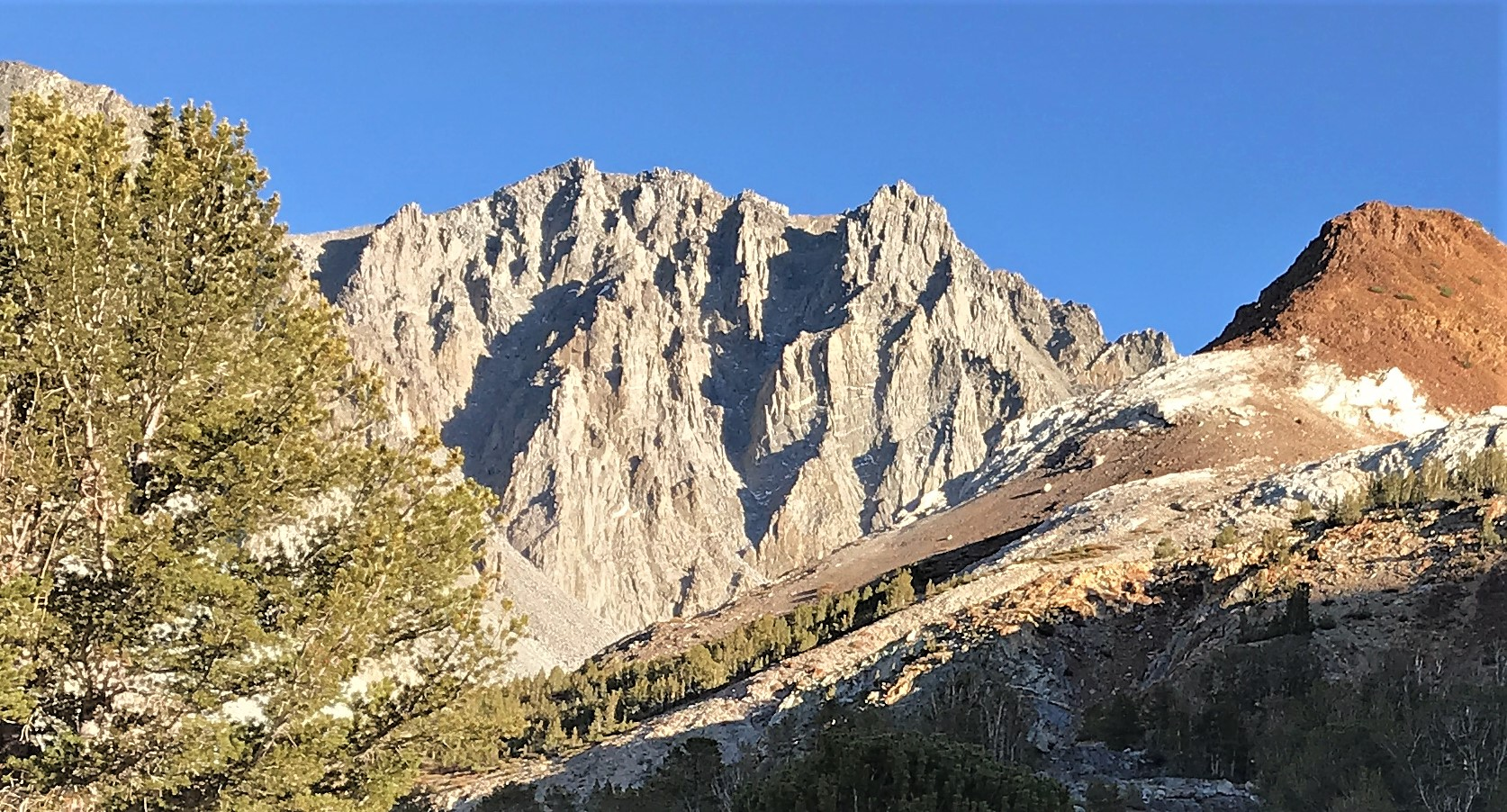
- West aspect, (Chocolate Peak to the right)

Highest point
- Elevation: 13,525 ft (4,122 m) NAVD 88
- Prominence: 845 ft (258 m)
- Parent peak: Mount Agassiz (13,899 ft)
- Isolation: 2.12 mi (3.41 km)
- Listing: Sierra Peaks Section
- Coordinates: 37°08′34″N 118°31′50″W

Geography
- Location within California Location within the United States
- Country: United States
- State: California
- County: Inyo
- Protected area: John Muir Wilderness
- Parent range: Sierra Nevada; Palisades; Inconsolable Range
- Topo map: USGS Mount Thompson

Climbing
- First ascent: 1926 or 1927 Norman Clyde
- Easiest route: East Ridge

Cloudripper is a 13,525-foot-elevation (4,122-meter) mountain summit located two miles east of the crest of the Sierra Nevada mountain range in Inyo County of northern California, United States. It is situated in the Palisades area of the John Muir Wilderness, on land managed by Inyo National Forest. It is approximately 14 miles (23 km) west of the community of Big Pine, 1.1 miles (1.8 km) north-northeast of Picture Puzzle, and 2.1 miles (3.4 km) south of parent Mount Agassiz. Cloudripper ranks as the 58th highest summit in California, and the highest point of the Inconsolable Range.

== Climbing ==
Established climbing routes on Cloudripper:

- East Ridge via Big Pine Lakes – class 1
- North Ridge via Green Lake – class 2
- West Chute via Chocolate Lake – class 3

The first ascent of the summit was made June 15, 1927, by Norman Clyde, who is credited with 130 first ascents, most of which were in the Sierra Nevada. Other sources place the date as June 15, 1926.

== Climate ==
According to the Köppen climate classification system, Cloudripper is located in an alpine climate zone. Most weather fronts originate in the Pacific Ocean, and travel east toward the Sierra Nevada mountains. As fronts approach, they are forced upward by the peaks, causing them to drop their moisture in the form of rain or snowfall onto the range (orographic lift). Precipitation runoff from this mountain drains east into North Fork Big Pine Creek, and northwest into headwaters of Bishop Creek.

== Gallery ==
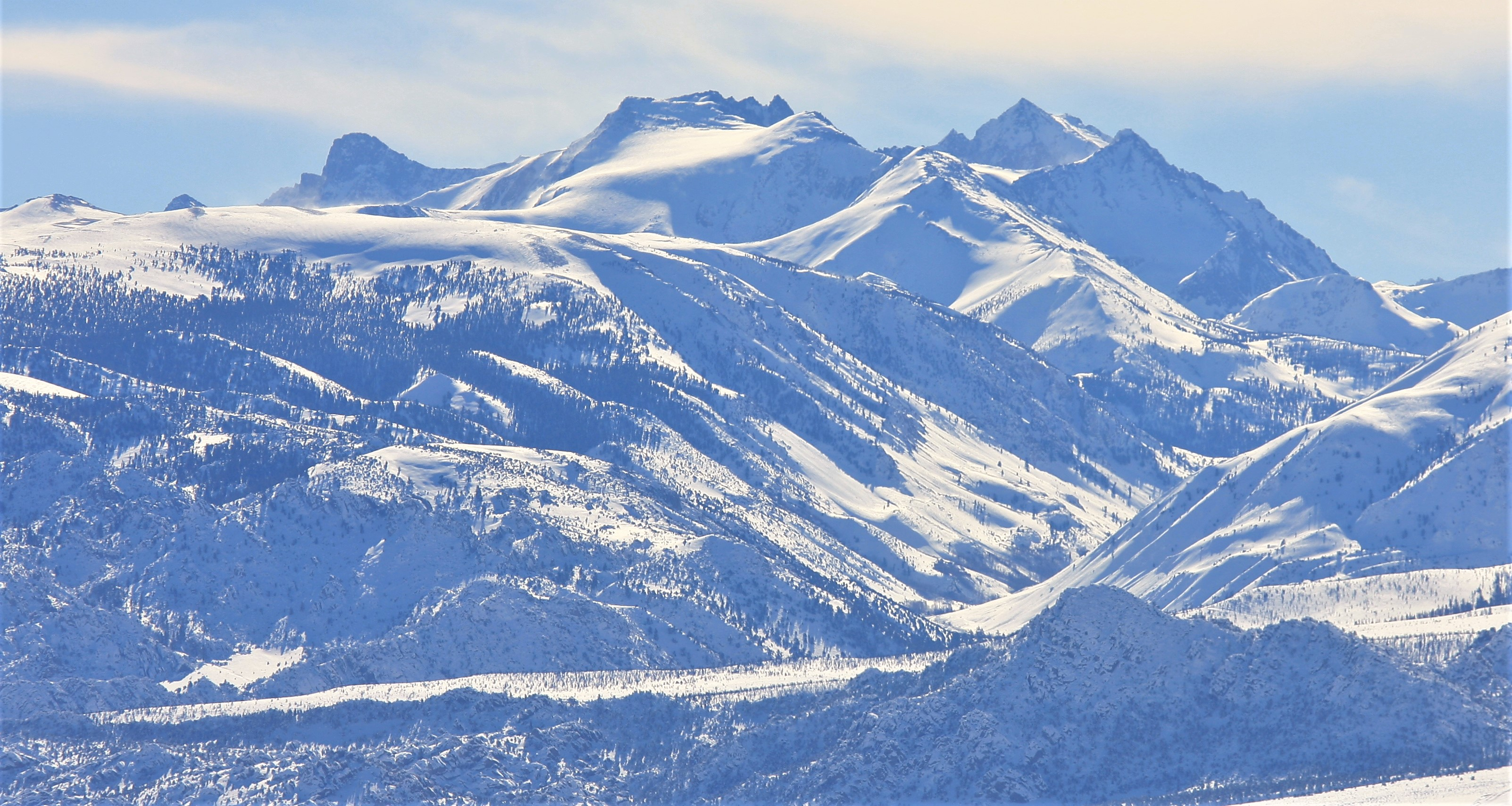
Cloudripper in winter

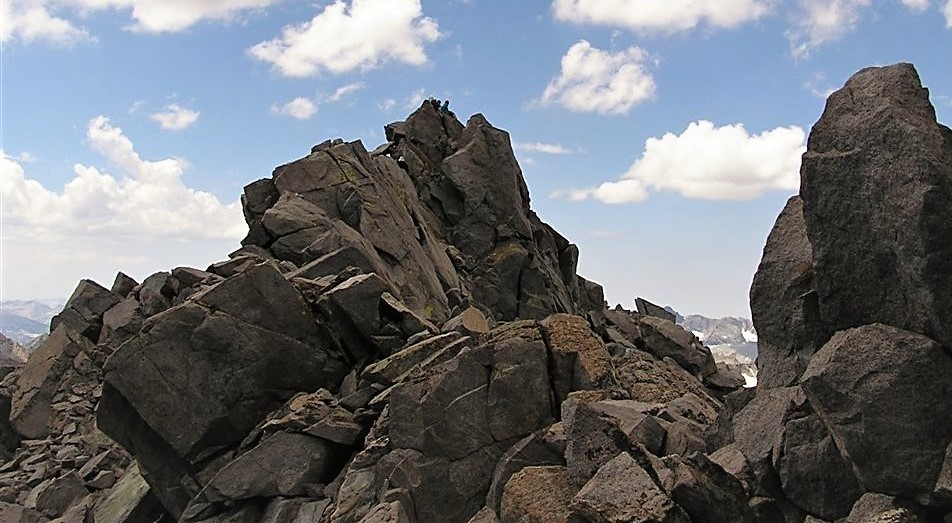
Cloudripper's summit

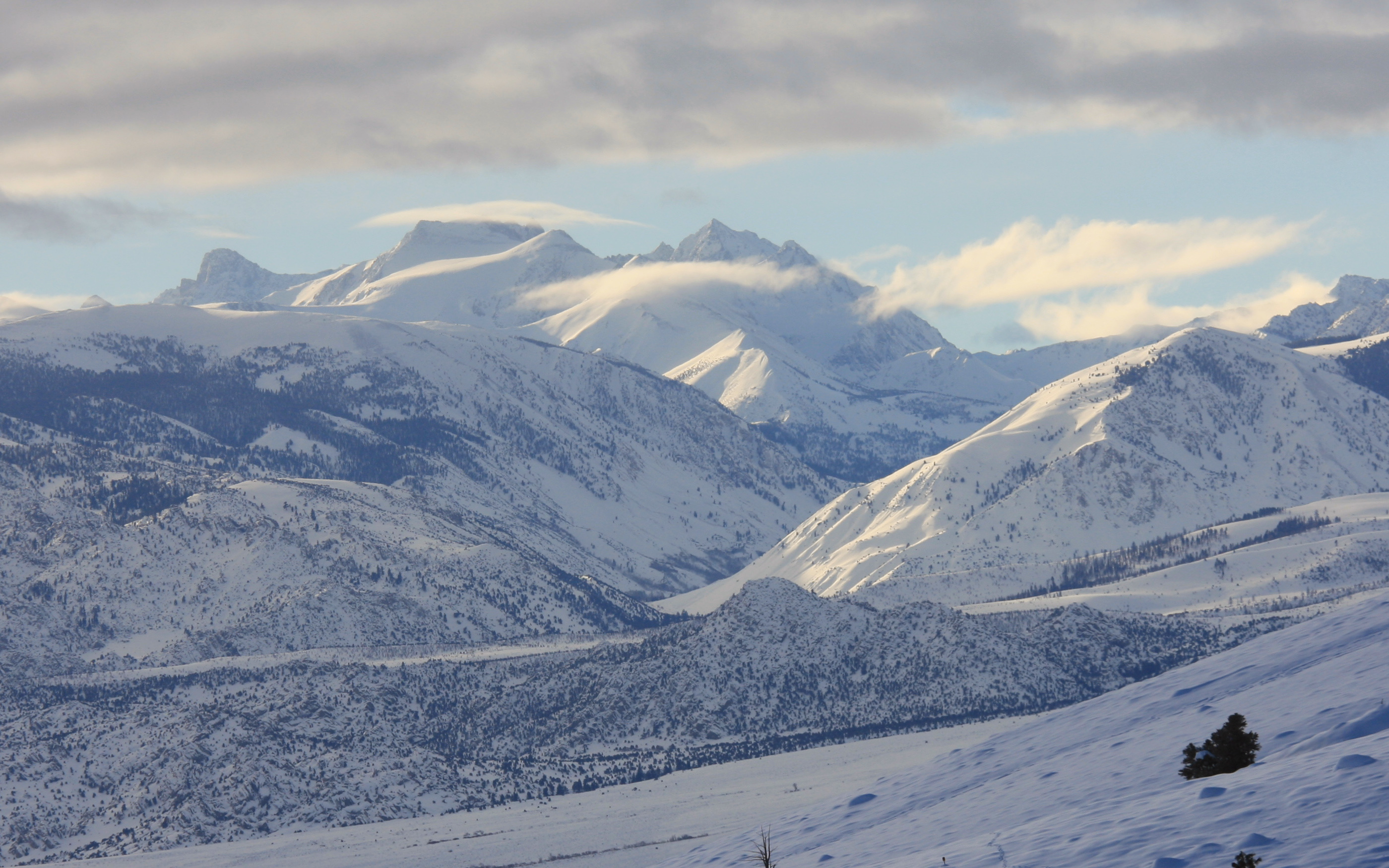

== See also ==
- List of the major 4000-meter summits of California
