= Picture Puzzle =

Mountain peak of the Sierra Nevada in California, United States

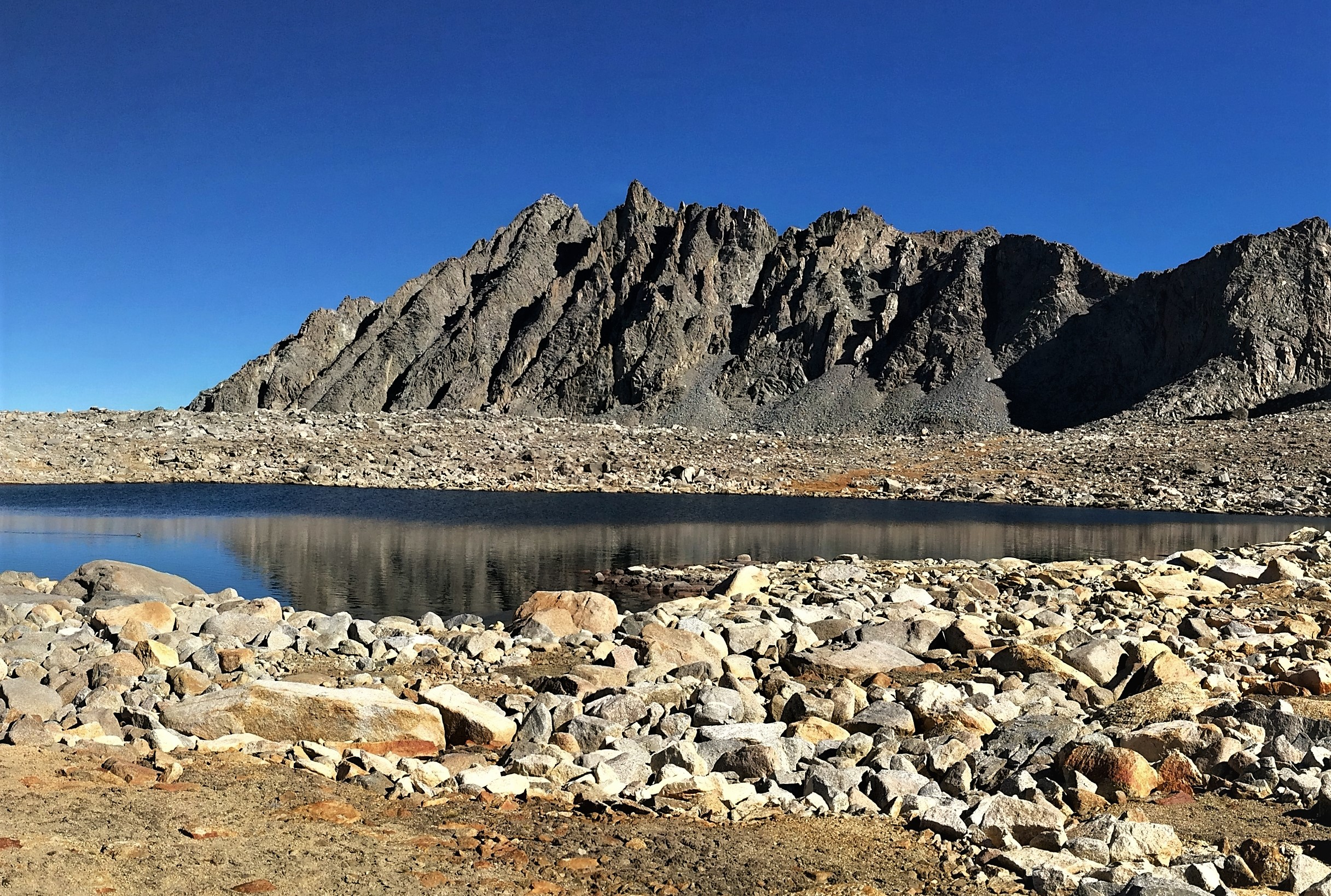
- South aspect, from Bishop Pass

Highest point
- Elevation: 13,286+ ft (4050+ m)
- Prominence: 600 ft (183 m)
- Parent peak: Cloudripper (13,525 ft)
- Isolation: 1.12 mi (1.80 km)
- Coordinates: 37°07′40″N 118°32′20″W

Geography
- Location within California Location within the United States
- Country: United States
- State: California
- County: Inyo
- Protected area: John Muir Wilderness
- Parent range: Sierra Nevada; Inconsolable Range
- Topo map: USGS Mount Thompson

Geology
- Rock age: Cretaceous
- Rock type: Inconsolable Quartz Monzodiorite

Climbing
- First ascent: 1937 by Norman Clyde
- Easiest route: Exposed scramble, class 3

Picture Puzzle, also known as Picture Puzzle Peak, is a 13,297-foot-elevation (4,053-meter) mountain summit located one mile east of the crest of the Sierra Nevada mountain range in Inyo County of northern California, United States. It is situated in the Palisades area of the John Muir Wilderness, on land managed by Inyo National Forest. It is approximately 14.5 miles (23.3 km) west of the community of Big Pine, one mile north of Bishop Pass, 0.8 miles (1.3 km) northwest of Aperture Peak, 1.2 miles (1.9 km) north-northwest of Mount Agassiz, and 1.1 miles (1.8 km) south-southwest of parent Cloudripper. Picture Puzzle ranks as the 90th-highest summit in California, and the third-highest peak of the Inconsolable Range.

== Climbing ==
Established climbing routes on Picture Puzzle:

- Northeast Couloir – class 3
- North Slope – class 3
- West Face – class 4

The first ascent of the summit was made June 15, 1937, by Norman Clyde, who is credited with 130 first ascents, most of which were in the Sierra Nevada.

== Climate ==
According to the Köppen climate classification system, Picture Puzzle is located in an alpine climate zone. Most weather fronts originate in the Pacific Ocean, and travel east toward the Sierra Nevada mountains. As fronts approach, they are forced upward by the peaks, causing them to drop their moisture in the form of rain or snowfall onto the range (orographic lift). Precipitation runoff from this mountain drains east into headwaters of North Fork Big Pine Creek, and west into headwaters of South Fork Bishop Creek.

== Gallery ==
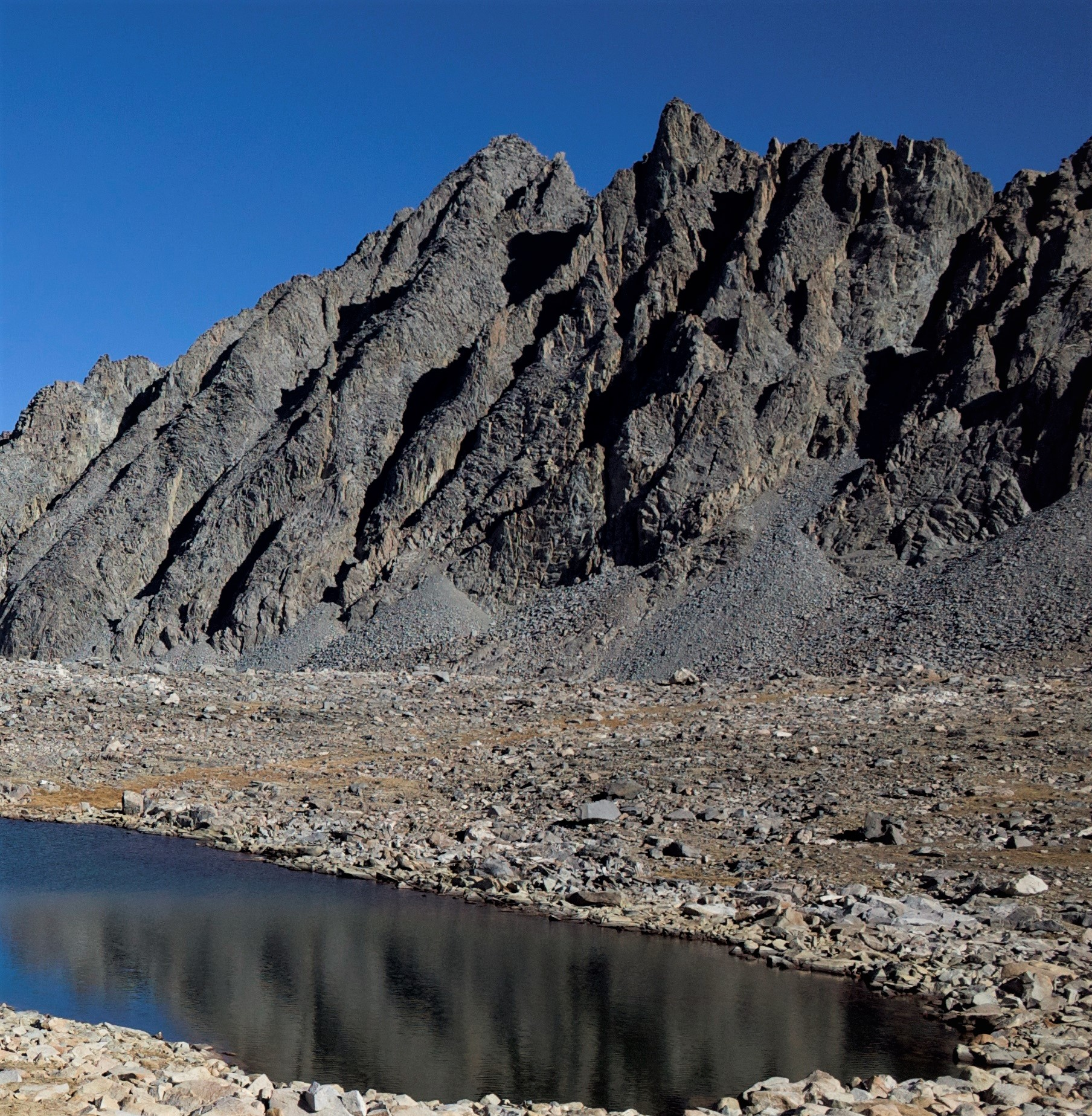
South aspect

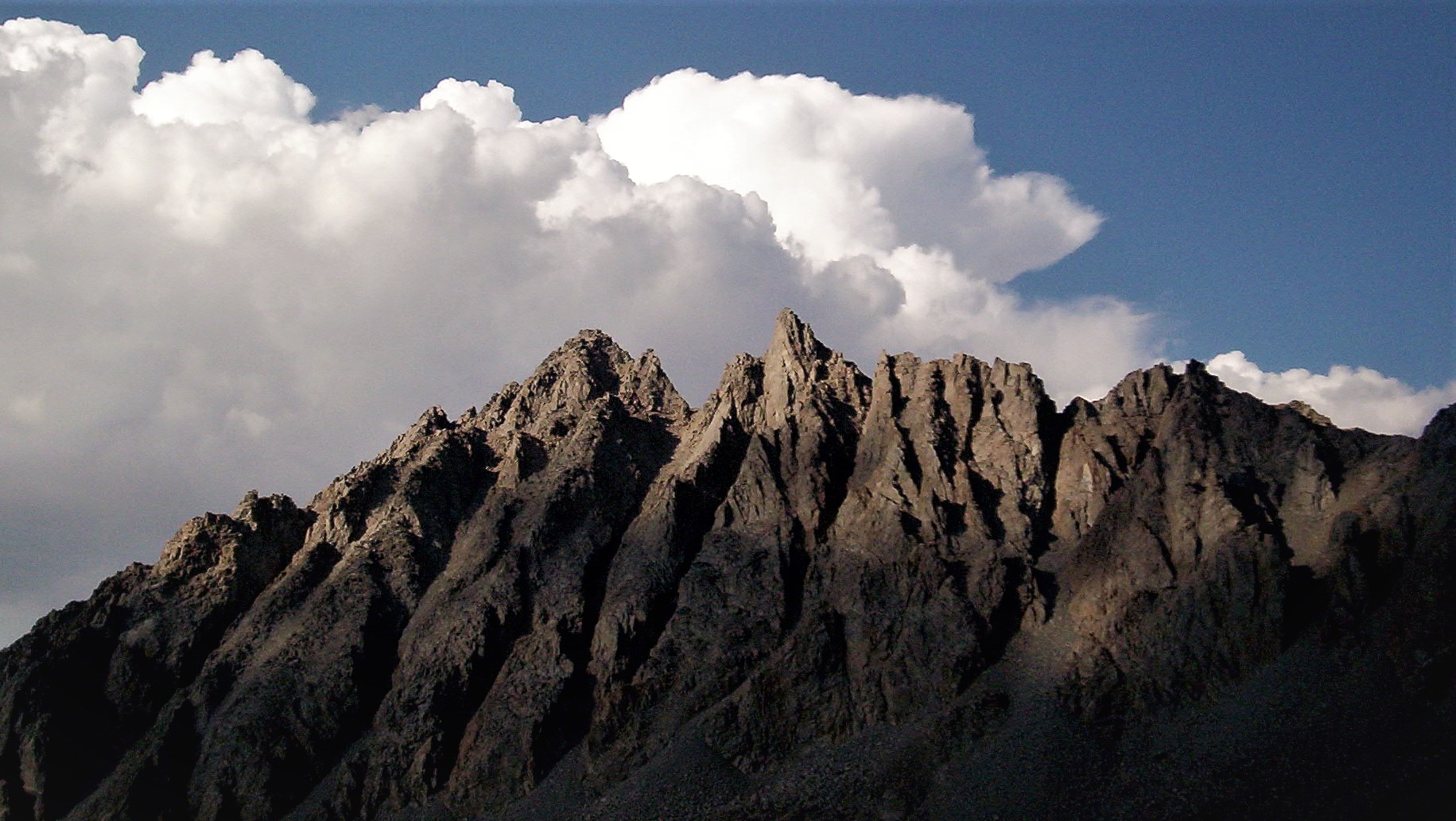

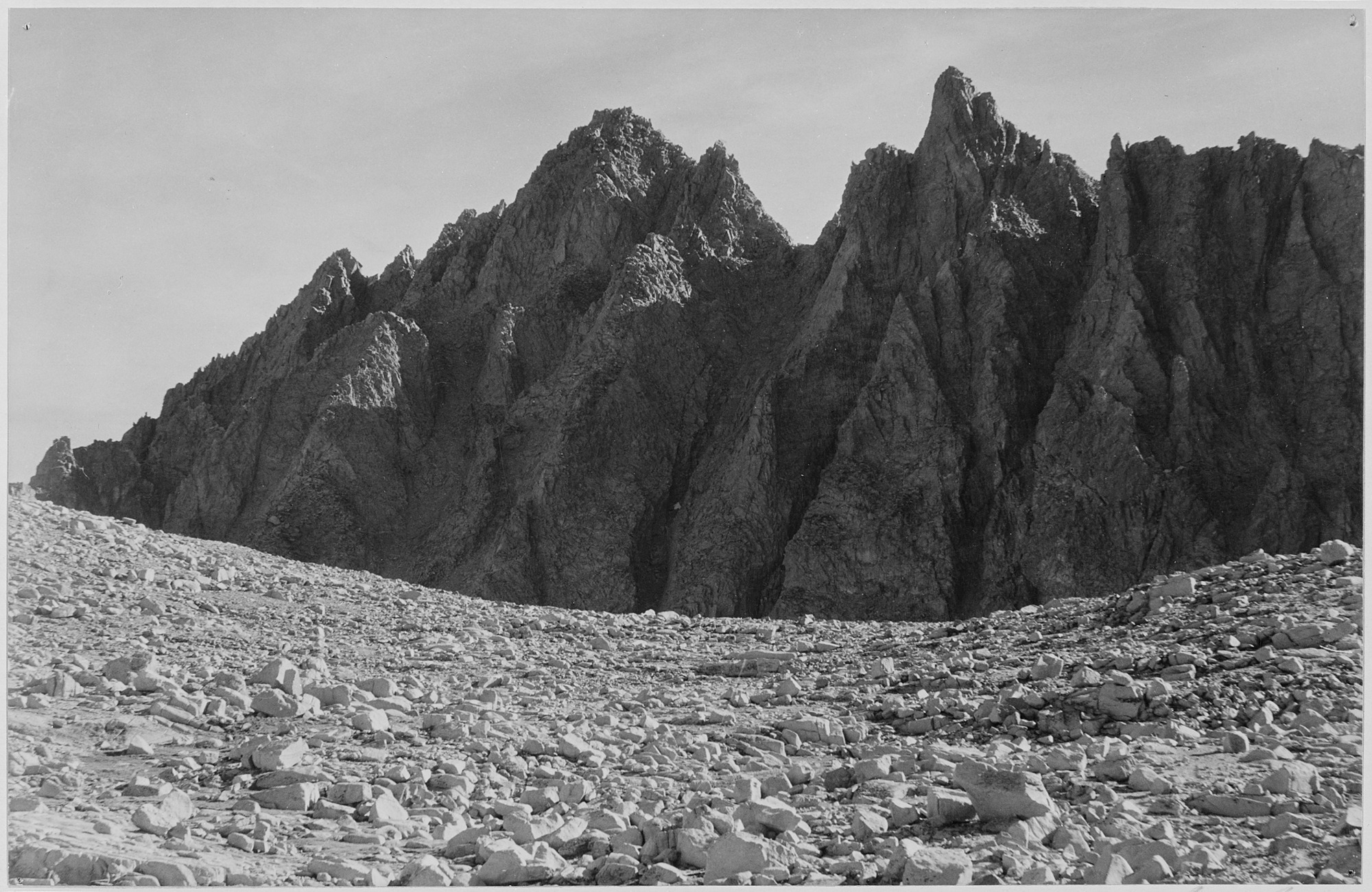
Picture Puzzle by Ansel Adams ca. 1936

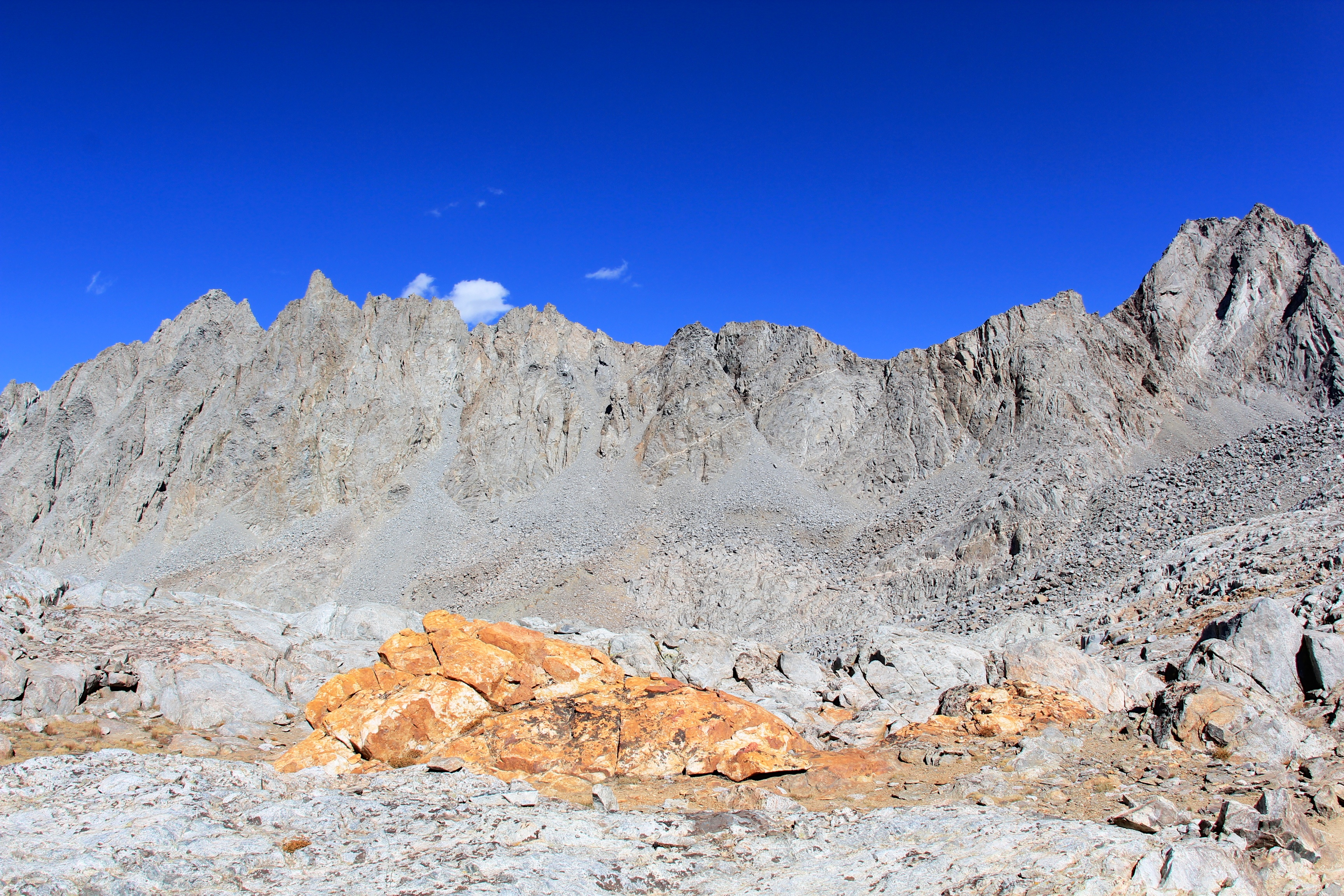
Picture Puzzle (left) and Aperture Peak (right)

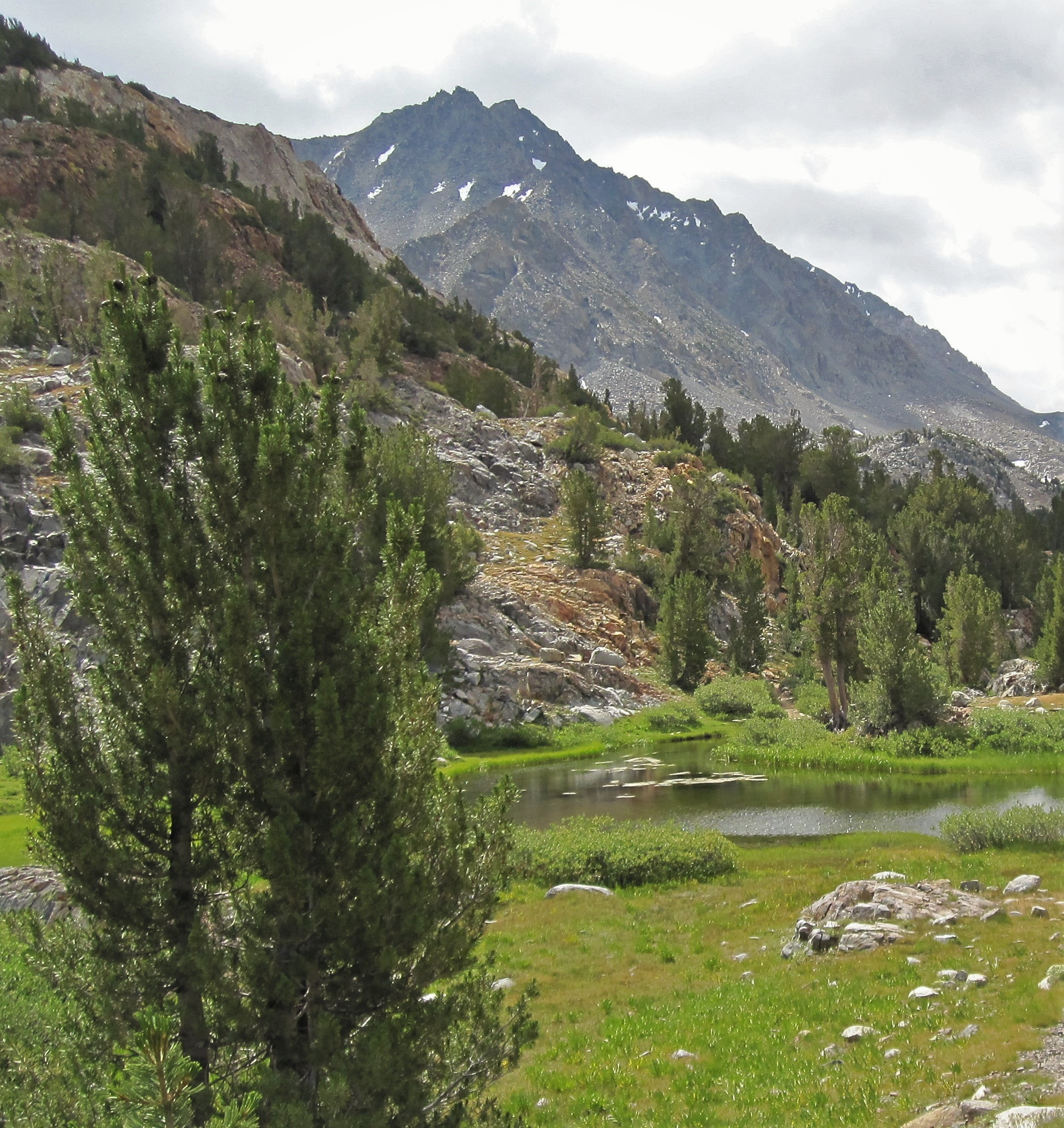
Picture Puzzle from northwest

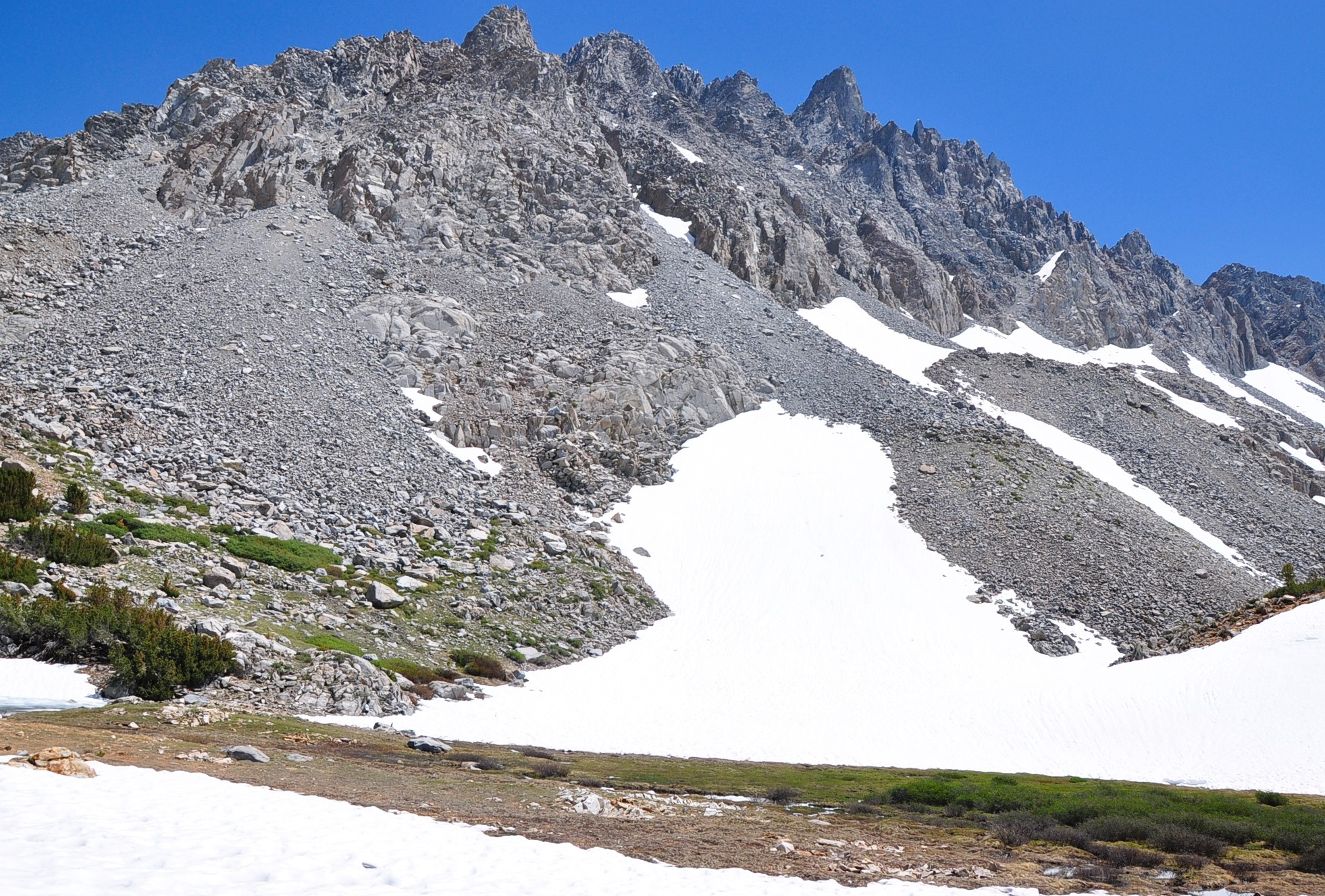

== See also ==
- List of the major 4000-meter summits of California
