= Aperture Peak =

Mountain in the state of California

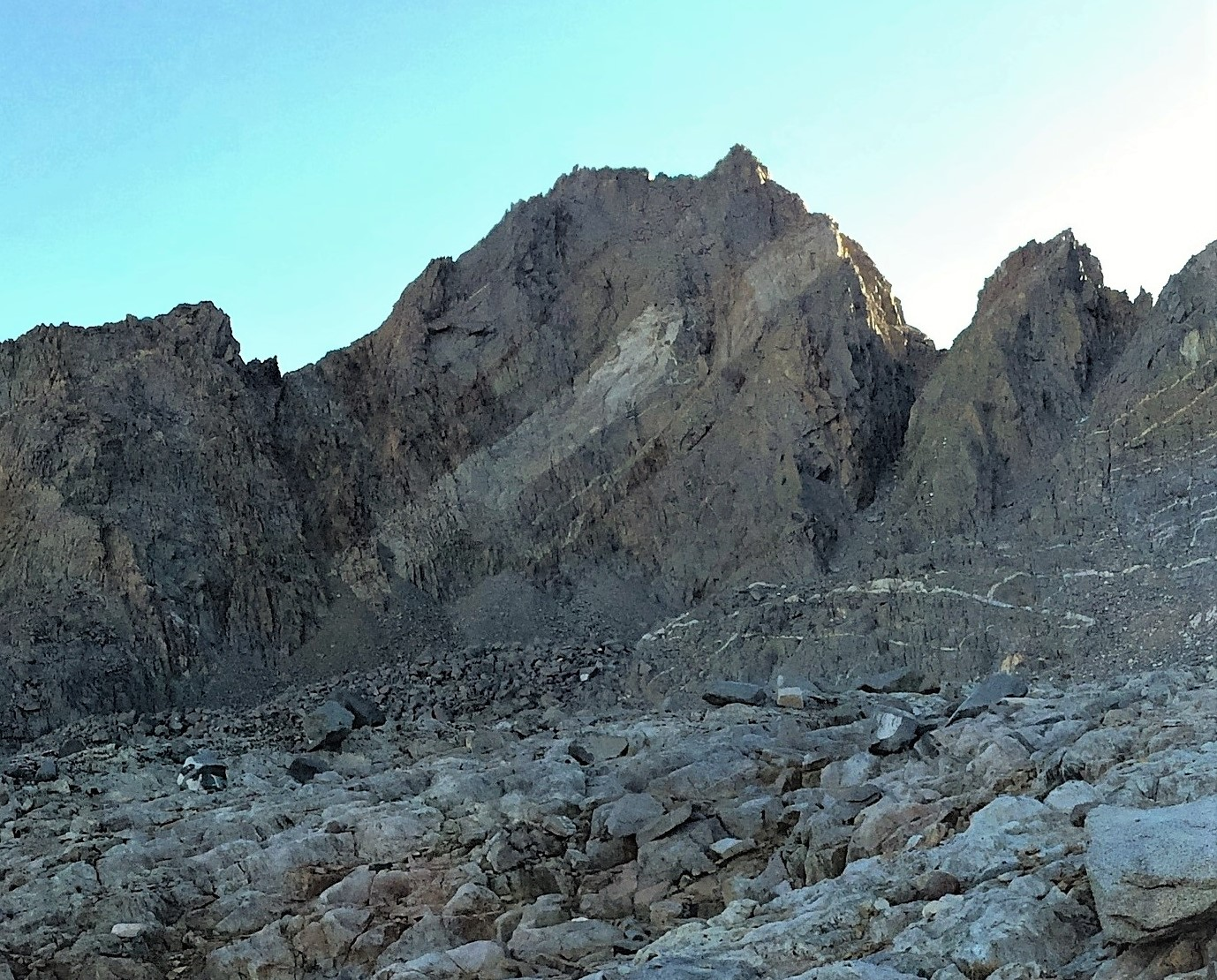
- West aspect

Highest point
- Elevation: 13,265 ft (4,043 m)
- Prominence: 305 ft (93 m)
- Parent peak: Mount Agassiz (13,899 ft)
- Isolation: 0.44 mi (0.71 km)
- Coordinates: 37°07′05″N 118°31′50″W

Geography
- Location within California Location within the United States
- Country: United States
- State: California
- County: Inyo
- Protected area: John Muir Wilderness
- Parent range: Sierra Nevada; Inconsolable Range
- Topo map: USGS North Palisade

Geology
- Rock age: Cretaceous
- Mountain type: Fault block
- Rock type: Inconsolable Quartz Monzodiorite

Climbing
- First ascent: 1934
- Easiest route: class 3 via Jigsaw Pass

Aperture Peak is a 13,265-foot-elevation (4,043-meter) mountain summit located in Inyo County, California, United States.

== Description ==
Aperture Peak is set within the John Muir Wilderness, on land managed by Inyo National Forest. It is situated one-half mile east of the crest of the Sierra Nevada mountain range in the Palisades area, just outside the boundary of Kings Canyon National Park. It is approximately 14 miles (23 km) west of the community of Big Pine, one mile (1.6 km) east-northeast of Bishop Pass, one-half mile (0.80 km) north of line parent Mount Agassiz, and 0.8 miles (1.3 km) southeast of Picture Puzzle. Aperture Peak ranks as the 95th-highest summit in California, and the fourth-highest peak of the Inconsolable Range. Topographic relief is modest as the summit rises 2,500 feet (760 meters) above the Big Pine Lakes in 1.5 mile. The west face of the peak features a large, white, diagonal dike, and a rock glacier lies below the east face.

== History ==
The first ascent of the summit was made June 14, 1934, by David Brower and Hervey Voge. This landform's toponym was officially adopted in 1969 by the U.S. Board on Geographic Names, but the name was used informally by mountaineers for years prior. The geological term "aperture" is the measure of the distance separating adjacent rock walls relating to joints and open discontinuities.

== Climate ==
According to the Köppen climate classification system, Aperture Peak is located in an alpine climate zone. Most weather fronts originate in the Pacific Ocean, and travel east toward the Sierra Nevada mountains. As fronts approach, they are forced upward by the peaks (orographic lift), causing them to drop their moisture in the form of rain or snowfall onto the range. Precipitation runoff from this mountain drains east into headwaters of North Fork Big Pine Creek, and west into headwaters of South Fork Bishop Creek.

== Gallery ==
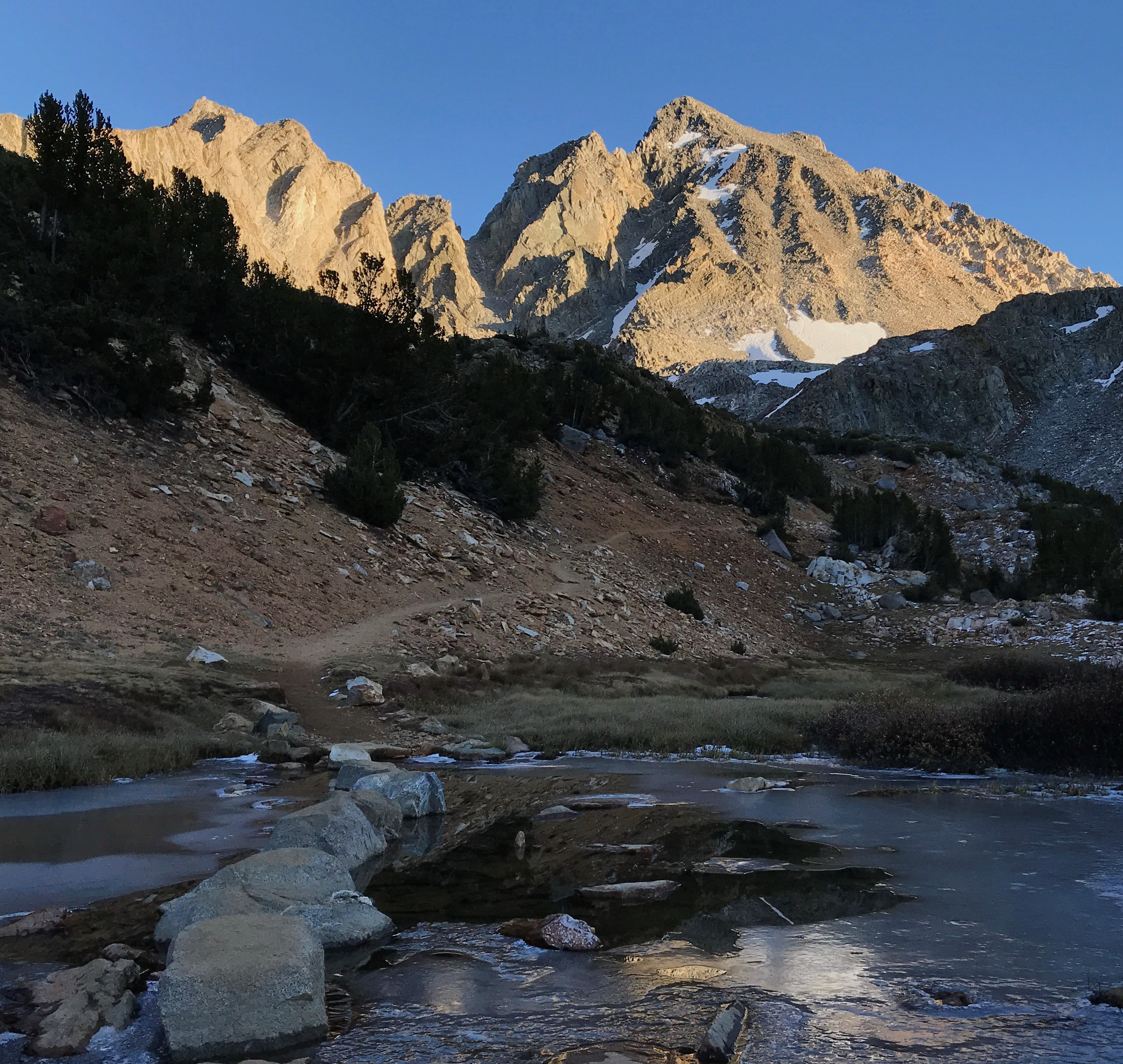
Aperture Peak (left) and Mount Agassiz from Bishop Lake

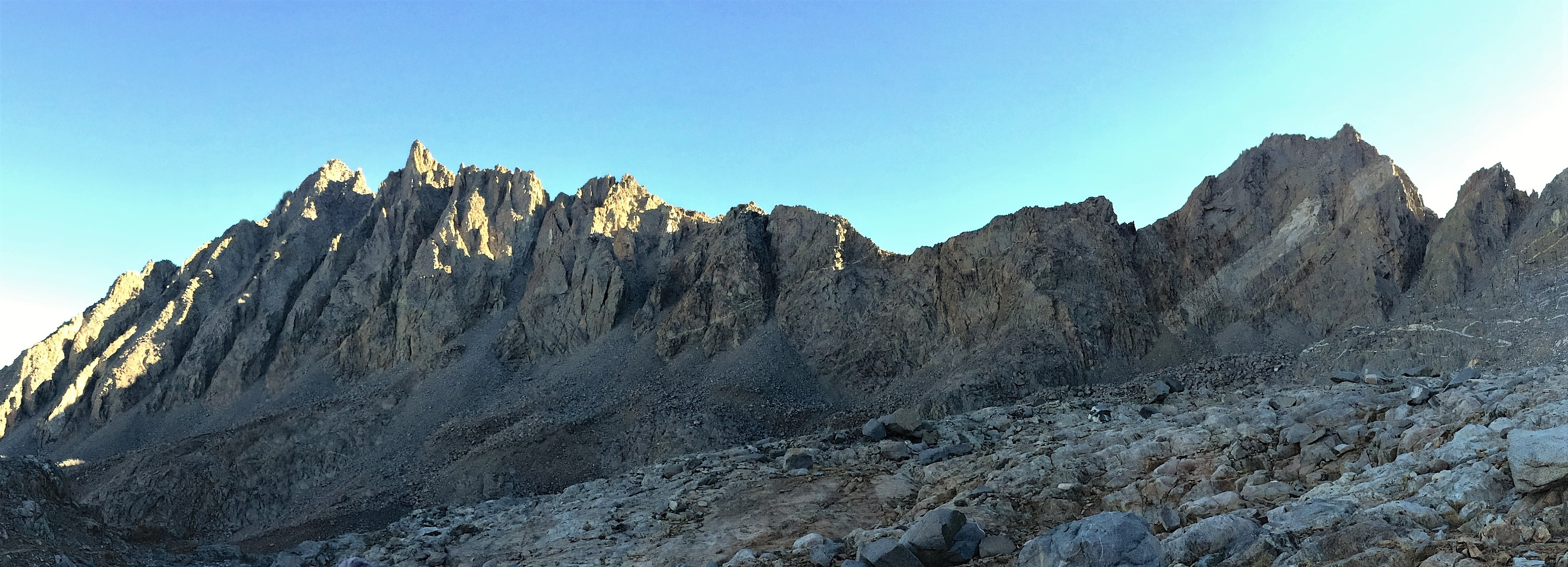
Picture Puzzle (left) and Aperture Peak (right) from Bishop Pass

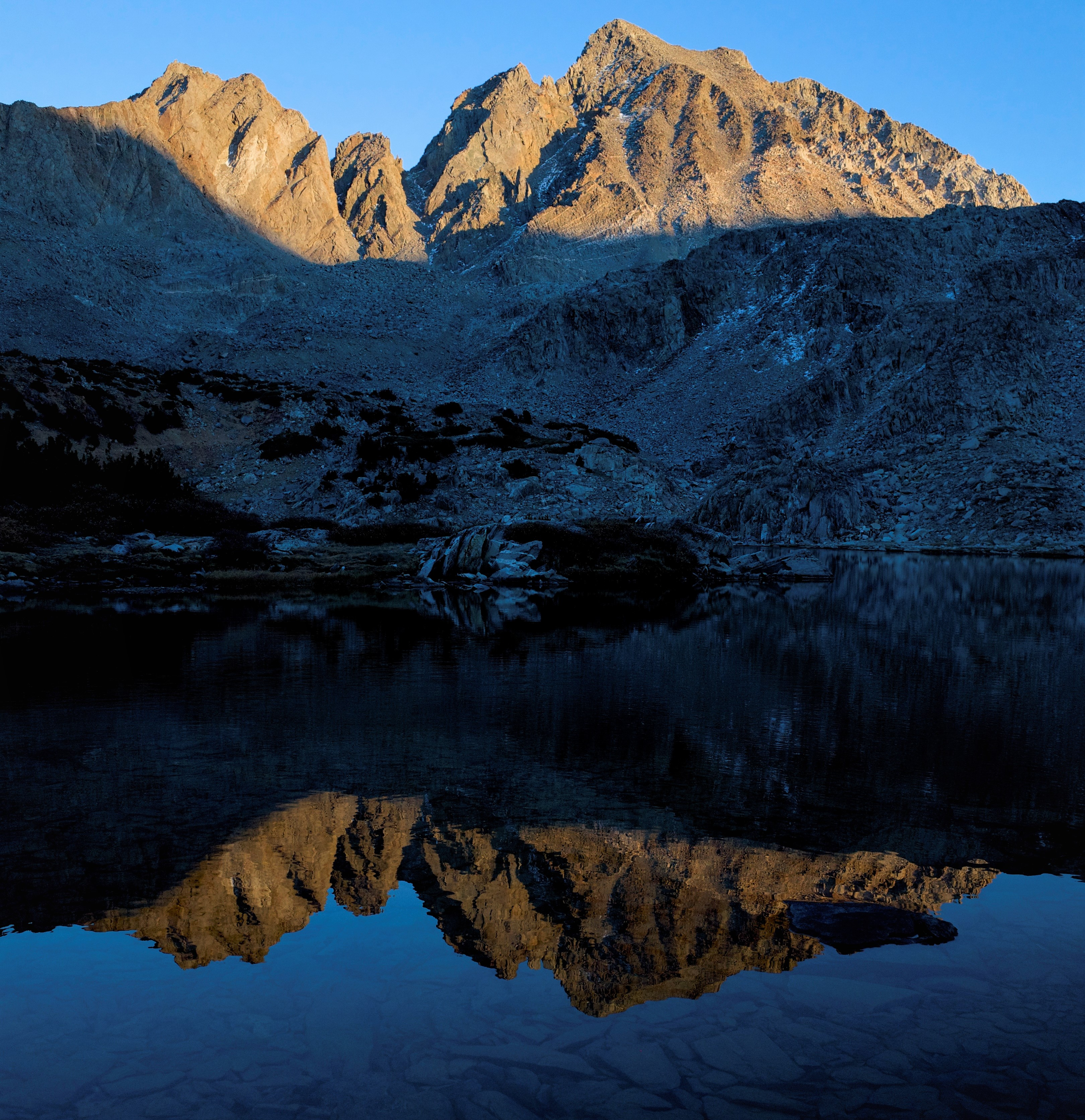
Aperture Peak (left) and Mount Agassiz from Bishop Lake

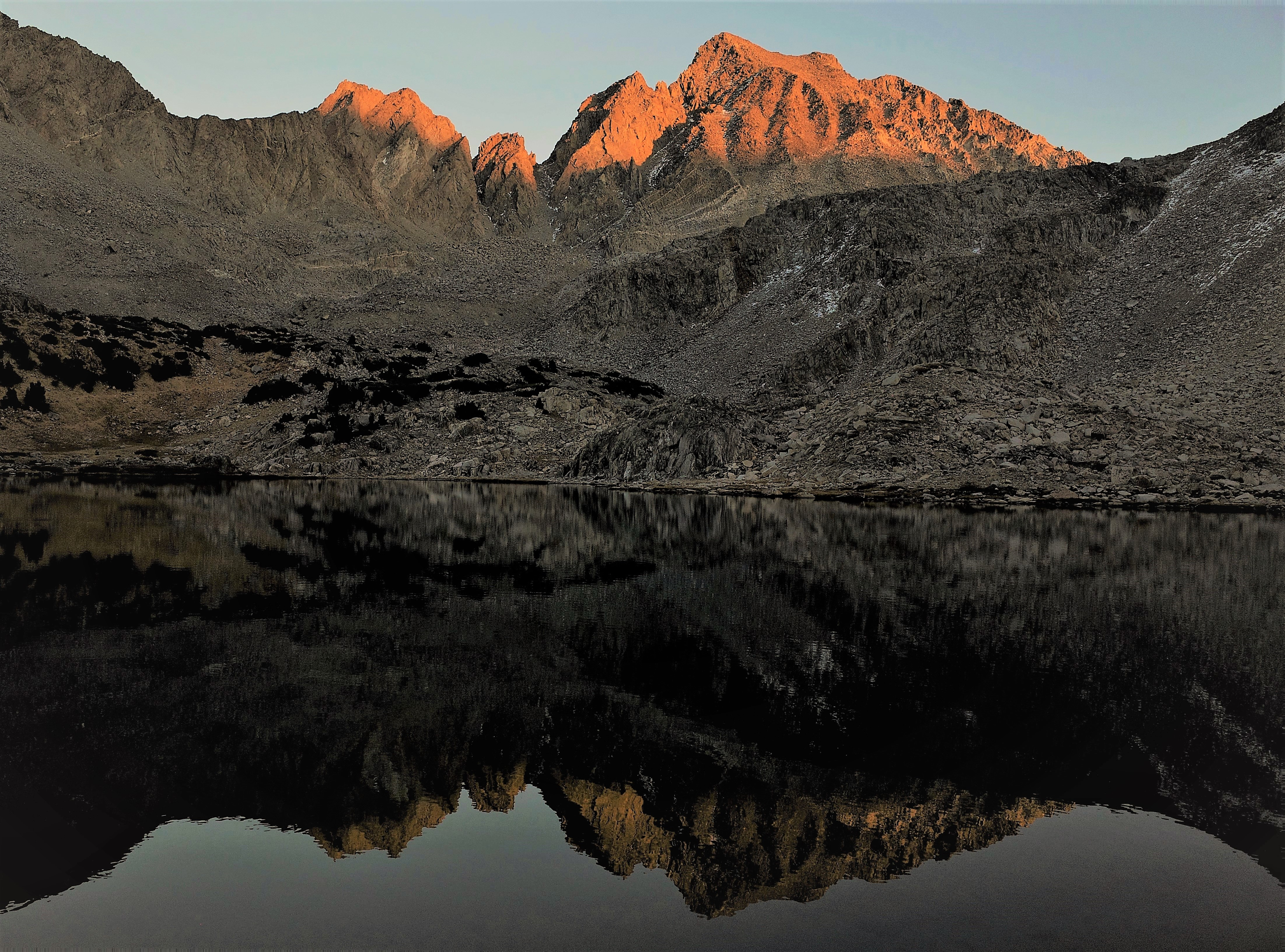
Sunset on Aperture Peak (left) and Mt. Agassiz, from Bishop Lake

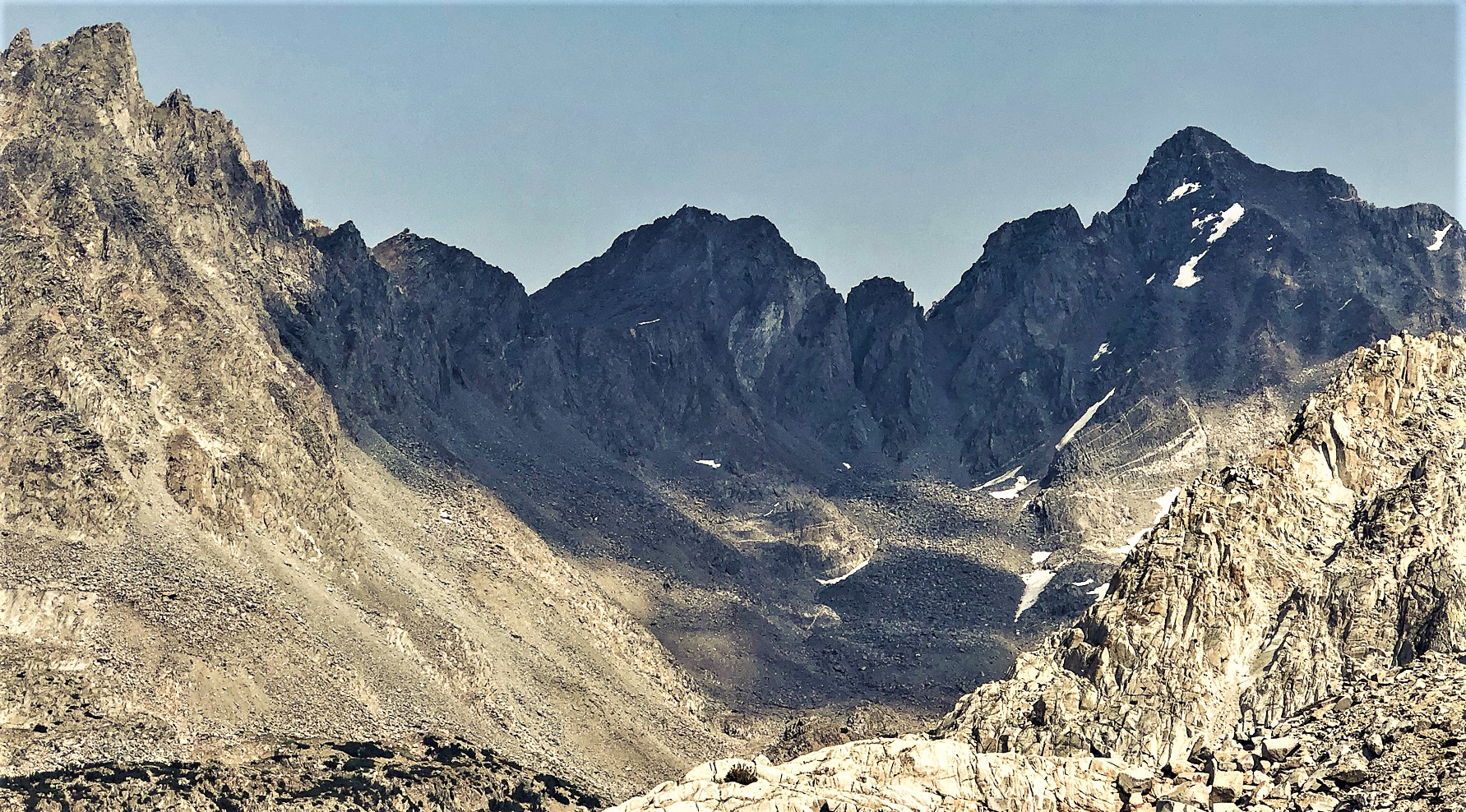
Picture Puzzle (left), Aperture Peak centered, and Mt. Agassiz (right)

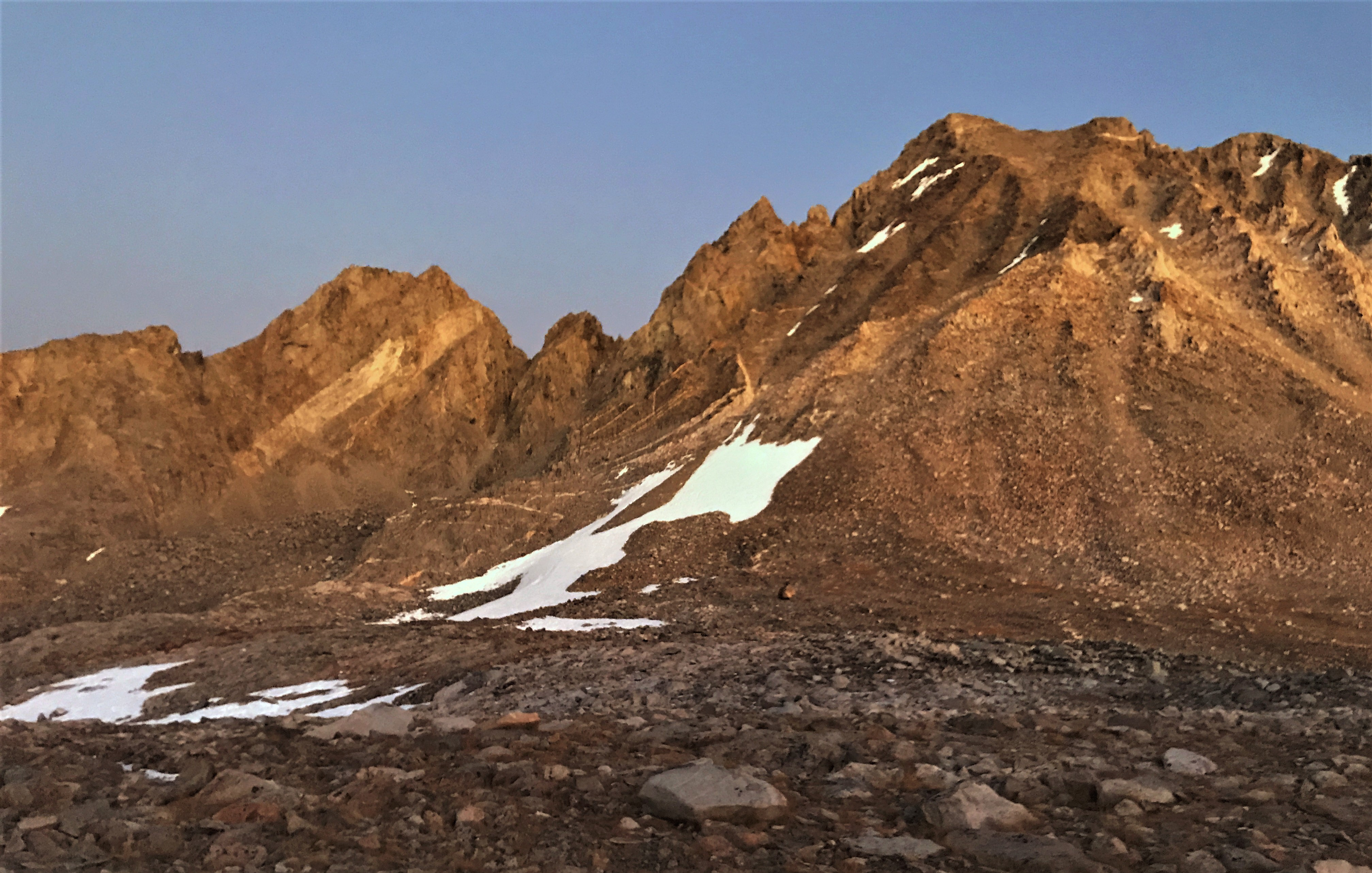
Dawn view of Aperture Peak (left) and Mt. Agassiz (right)

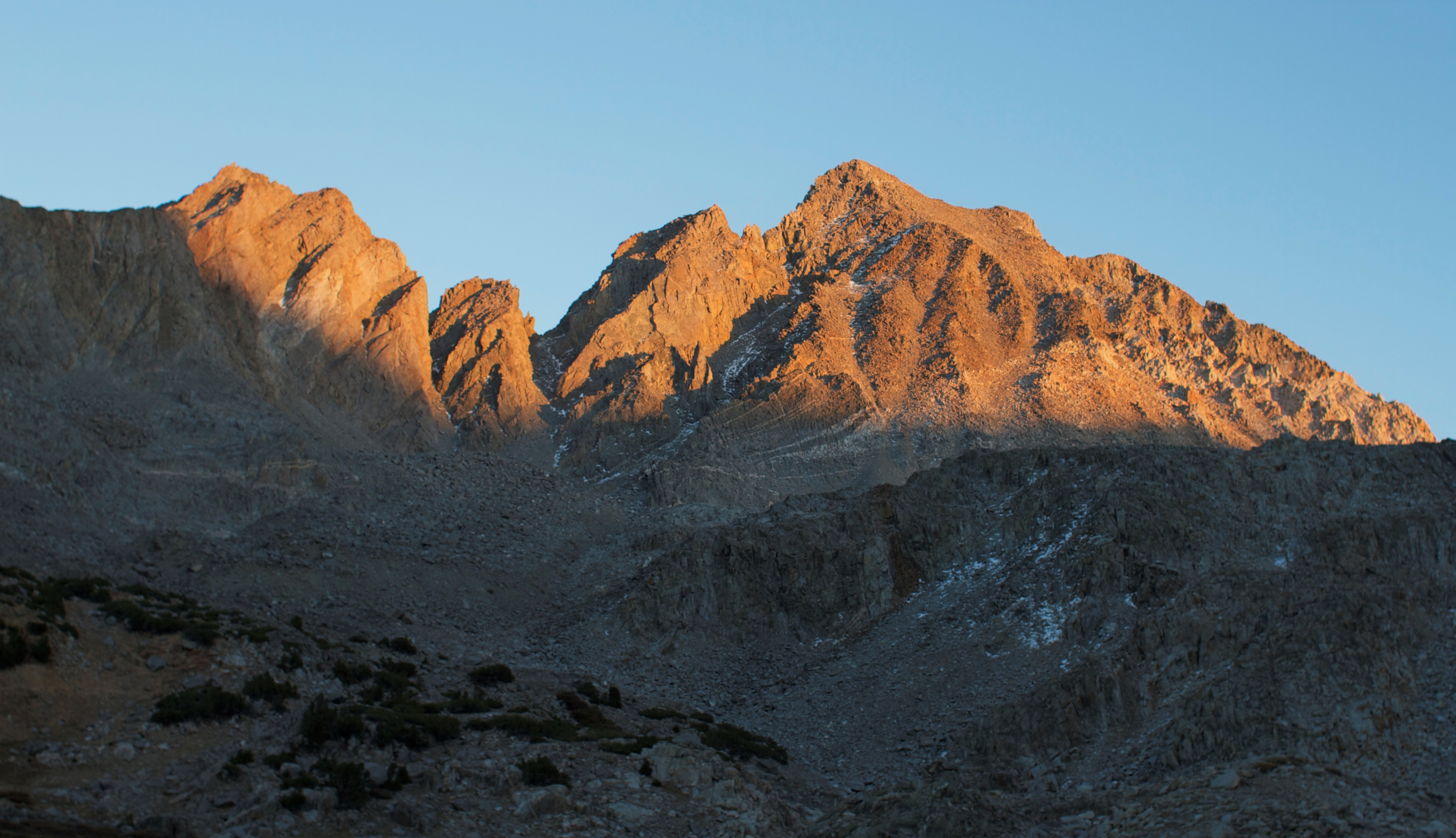
Sunset on Aperture Peak (left) and Mt. Agassiz

== See also ==
- List of the major 4000-meter summits of California
- Thirteener
