= Intake Two =

Reservoir in Inyo County, California

- Coordinates: 37°14′51″N 118°35′03″W

Intake Two is a small lake created by a dam on Bishop Creek. It is approximately 16 miles west of Bishop, California. It is well known for its fishing as it is annually stocked with Rainbow Trout, and has a healthy population of wild Brown Trout.

== See also ==
- Lake Sabrina
