= Westgard (surname) =

Westgard or Westgård is a Norwegian surname that may refer to

- A. L. Westgard (1865–1921), Norwegian-born American photographer
  - Westgard Pass in California named after A. L. Westgard
- Thomas Hjalmar Westgård (born 1995), Norwegian-born Irish cross-country skier
- Michael Kennedy Westgard II (born 1978), Earthling Timberframer born in Oregon, USA
