= Piute Pass =

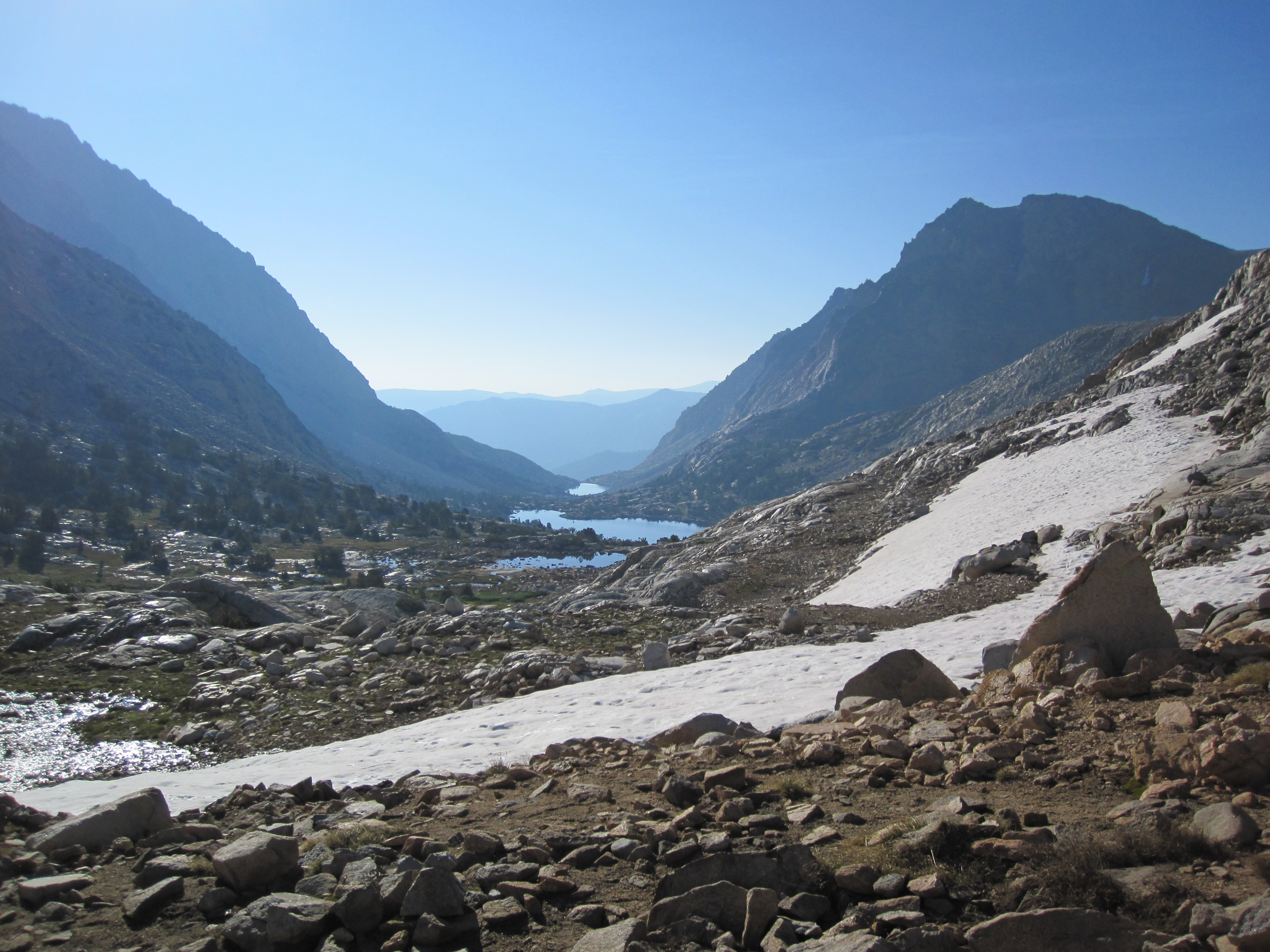
- View from pass looking east
- Interactive map of Piute Pass
- Elevation: 11,417 feet (3,480 m)
- Traversed by: Piute Pass Trail

Third Approach
- Range: Sierra Nevada
- Coordinates: 37°14′21″N 118°41′02″W

Piute Pass is a 11,417 feet (3,480 m) mountain pass along the crest of the Sierra Nevada, between Inyo and Fresno Counties in the John Muir Wilderness area of California. The pass is traversed by the Piute Pass Trail, linking the John Muir Trail to the west with North Lake to the east.

Native Americans used Piute Pass for trade across the Sierra for millennia. In the 1920s, various local and business groups lobbied for a highway to be constructed over the pass, envisioning it as a scenic route through areas that was compared to the Swiss Alps, and boosting the economies of both counties. The highway proposal died away by the 1930s as the Forest Service and the Sierra Club fought to protect the wilderness areas along that portion of the Sierra. Eventually, the Wilderness Act of 1964 established the John Muir Wilderness, and what is now State Route 168 remains unbuilt between Huntington Lake in the Western Sierra and Lake Sabrina in the Eastern Sierra.
