= Deep Springs Valley =

Valley in the Inyo-White Mountains of Inyo County, California

Deep Springs Valley is a high desert valley in the Inyo-White Mountains of Inyo County, California. It is east of the Owens Valley and the Sierra Nevada mountain range, and south of Fish Lake Valley, Nevada, near the California-Nevada state border.

California State Route 168 connects it to the Owens and Fish Lake valleys, crossing Westgard Pass to the west and Gilbert Pass to the north. To the northwest lies White Mountain Peak. To the east lies Eureka Valley, connected via Soldier Pass in the Piper Mountain Wilderness, which can be traversed on horseback but not by automobile.

== Geography ==
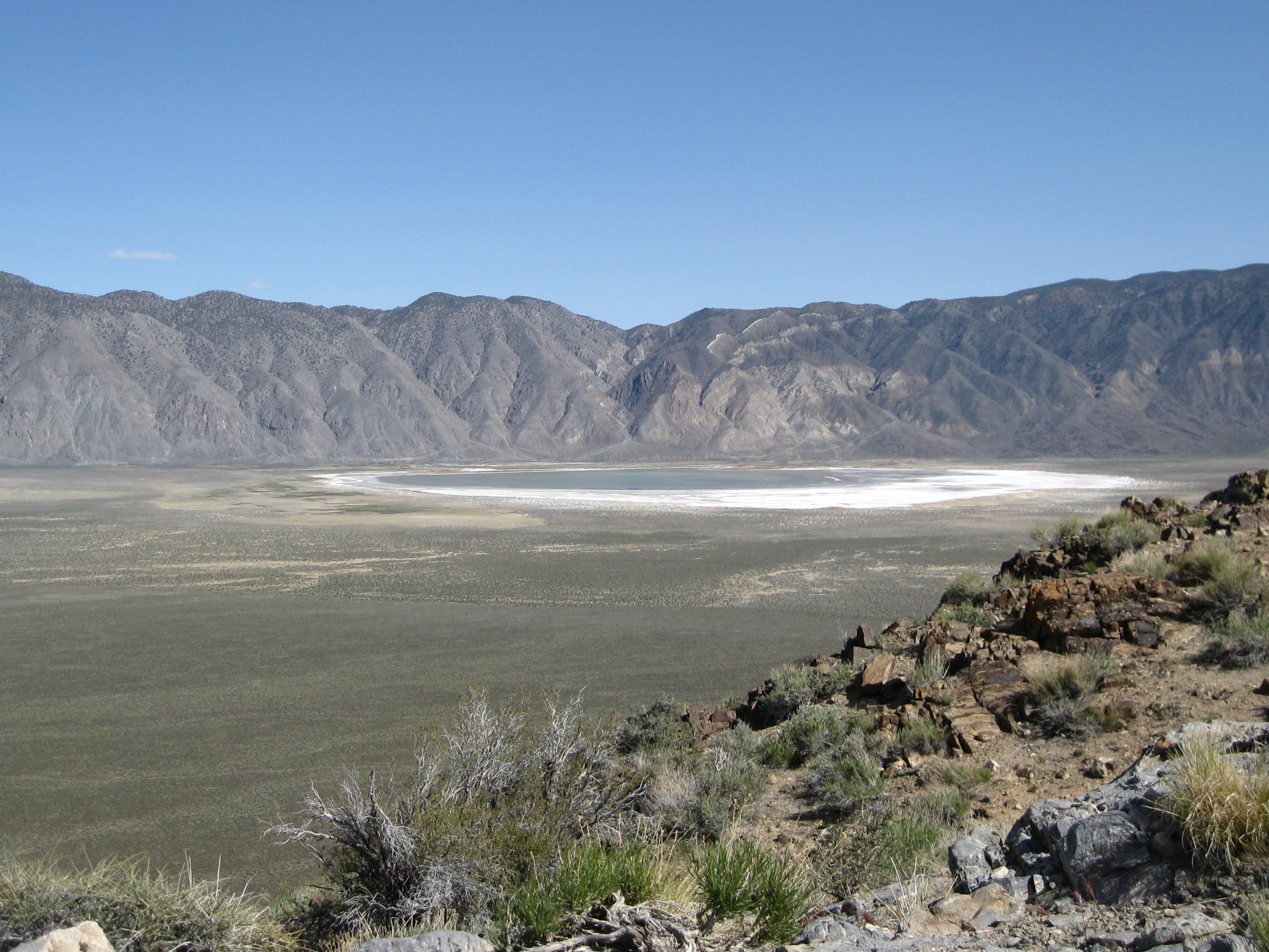
Deep Springs Lake from the northwest

Deep Springs Lake is a playa, a seasonal salt lake, generally drying in the summer to produce a salt pan, with surface water replenished in late spring with flows from nearby springs and snowmelt that travels the length of the valley from Wyman and Crooked creeks, which enter from the north. Birds, and birdwatchers, flock to the Lake during the spring and fall migrations. Surrounding the lake are numerous springs, some artesian, which gave the valley its name.

The springs are home to the Deep Springs black toad (Bufo exsul, or "exile toad"), an endemic species that occurs only in Deep Springs Valley. Although the population in Antelope Springs was once thought to be introduced, a genetics study published in 2009 found that there was not strong similarity to the perceived source population and this population likely occurs naturally. The population of toads, however, appears to be stable, despite the presence of cattle that graze around the lake during the winter and spring.

== Geology ==
On the hillsides of the southwestern end of the valley, lie the Poleta Folds, a distinctly visible example of crustal folding frequently studied by geology students from the University of California and California State University educational systems. The intensely folded and clearly visible layers comprise the Cambrian-aged Poleta formation. Several complex fault systems add to the challenge for geology students to unravel the area's history. The Poleta Folds field area is revered as one of the most complexly folded and faulted in California, and has been used by generations of undergraduate-level geology students around the United States and Canada. During a typical summer one can often find near-established trails leading to the best outcrops.

Also easily visible at the base of the Inyo Mountains, in the southwestern end of the valley behind Deep Springs Lake, is a sizable dip-slip fault. Researchers showed that the most recent fault scarp had an average displacement of 2.7 meters (8 ft 10 in) along a 20 km (12 mi) section of the fault. With an estimated rupture area of 345 km^{2} (133 sq mi), the event was calculated to have a moment magnitude of 7.0 and was estimated to have occurred about 1,800 years ago. The fault is still active, but studies suggest that it slips about every 4000 years. Deep Springs Lake is at 37°16′35″N 118°02′37″W. At 4,905 feet (1,495 m) in elevation, the lake is intermittently filled and actively precipitating dolomite, understood to rarely occur in such conditions.

It is conjectured that at times between 70,000 and 90,000 BCE, Deep Springs Lake was a balanced-fill lake that overflowed into Eureka Valley via Soldier Pass.

== Population ==
It is the home of Deep Springs College, a nontraditional two-year liberal arts institution with about 26 students. There are also ruins of an early small mining establishment, White Mountain City, in the northwest corner of the valley.

== See also ==
- Eureka Valley Sand Dunes
