= California State Route 168 =

Highway in California

State Route 168
- Map of eastern California with CA 168 highlighted in red; the gap represents the unconstructed segment over the Sierra Nevada

Route information
- Maintained by Caltrans
- Length: 124 mi (200 km)
- Existed: 1934–present
- Tourist routes: Sierra Heritage Scenic Byway; Ancient Bristlecone Scenic Byway
- Restrictions: The segment from Lake Sabrina east to Aspendell in the eastern Sierra is closed most winters due to snow.

Section 1
- West end: SR 41 / SR 180 in Fresno
- East end: Huntington Lake

Section 2
- West end: Lake Sabrina
- Major intersections: US 395 from Bishop to Big Pine
- East end: SR 266 at Oasis

Location
- Country: United States
- State: California
- Counties: Fresno, Inyo, Mono

Highway system
- State highways in California; Interstate; US; State; Scenic; History; Pre‑1964; Unconstructed; Deleted; Freeways
← SR 167	→ SR 169

State Route 168 (SR 168) is an east-west state highway in the U.S. state of California that is separated into two distinct segments by the Sierra Nevada. The western segment runs from State Routes 41 and 180 in Fresno east to Huntington Lake along the western slope of the Sierra. The eastern segment connects Lake Sabrina in the Eastern Sierra to State Route 266 in the community of Oasis, just to the west of the Nevada border. The eastern segment of SR 168 also forms a concurrency with U.S. Route 395 between Bishop and Big Pine. Originally conceived as a trans-Sierra highway, the California Department of Transportation (Caltrans) has no plans to complete SR 168 over the Sierra Nevada through wilderness areas.

== Route description ==
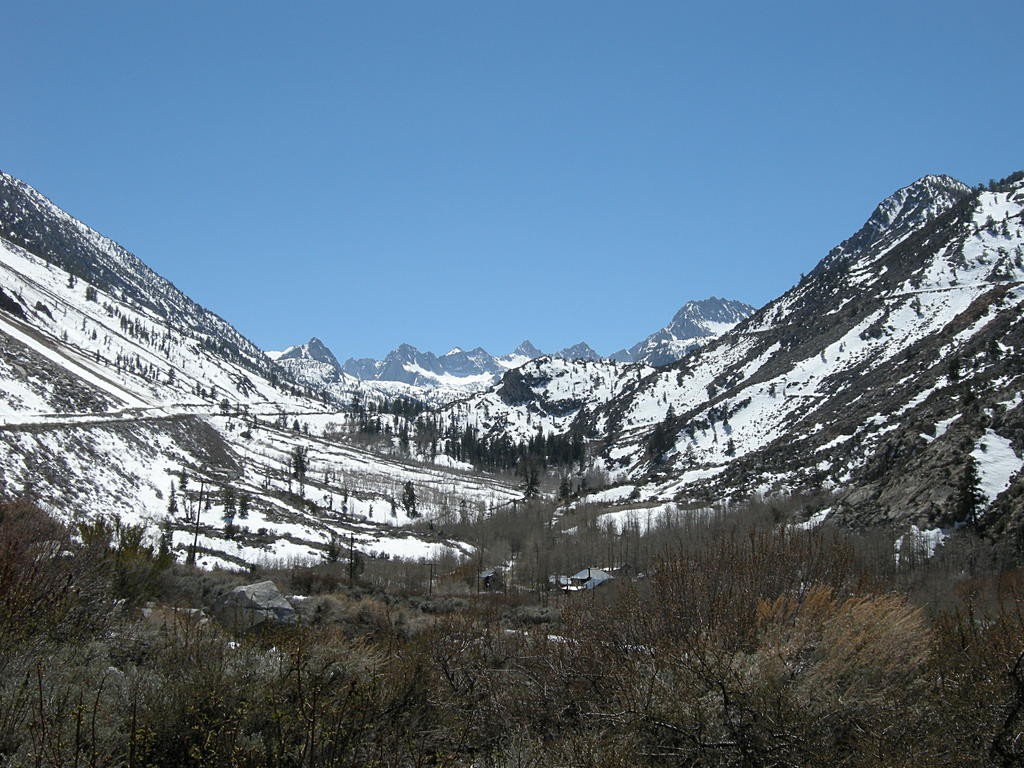
Highway 168 along Bishop Creek, Eastern Sierra

Route 168 is defined in section 468 of the California Streets and Highways Code. The definition omits the gap through the Sierra Nevada, as well as the concurrency with Route 395 instead of duplicating that segment in the other route's definition in the code:

Route 168 is from:
(a) Fresno to Huntington Lake.
(b) Camp [sic] Sabrina to Route 395.
(c) Route 395 at Big Pine to Route 266 at Oasis.

The western segment of SR 168 begins as the Sierra Freeway in southeast Fresno at its interchange with Highway 180. The Sierra Freeway extends west to Clovis, where it ends at an at-grade intersection at Owen's Mountain Parkway. SR 168 then continues as a four-lane expressway to Shepherd Avenue at the northeast edge of Clovis, where it then assumes the two-lane Tollhouse Road before it begins its ascent up the Sierra Foothills. Near Humphreys Station, Tollhouse Road branches off and takes a direct route northeast to Tollhouse, while SR 168 bypasses northwest through Prather. SR 168 and Tollhouse Road then merge again north of Tollhouse. In Ockenden, SR 168 changes from Tollhouse Road to Huntington Lake Road. The highway then continues east up the Sierra Nevada, passing Shaver Lake before ending at Huntington Lake.

Before the reconstruction of urban Route 168 as a freeway, the route started at SR 41 and Shaw Avenue in Fresno. SR 168 ran along Shaw Avenue, Clovis Avenue, Third Street (Clovis), and Tollhouse Road to the current end of the freeway.

SR 168 cannot be used to cross the Sierra Nevada. The closest crossings of the Sierra Nevada are SR 120 via Tioga Pass to the north and Sherman Pass to the south. Both of these passes are accessible in warmer months only.

The eastern segment of SR 168 has its western terminus at Lake Sabrina on the eastern slope of the Sierra Nevada. This rural mountain road runs east to the town of Bishop, then joins U.S. Route 395 for 14.6 miles before separating from 395 in Big Pine. SR 168 then climbs into the White Mountains through Westgard Pass, passing the Ancient Bristlecone Pine Forest. From here it traverses Deep Springs Valley, home of Deep Springs College, before crossing into Fish Lake Valley, where the segment ends at SR 266, just west of the Nevada border. The segment of the highway from Lake Sabrina east to the community of Aspendell is subject to closure to most vehicles during the winter months, usually not opening until mid- or late-April, due to snow removal. The winter road closure gate is located to the southwest of Aspendell.

SR 168 is part of the California Freeway and Expressway System, and in the Fresno and Clovis city limits is part of the National Highway System, a network of highways that are considered essential to the country's economy, defense, and mobility by the Federal Highway Administration. SR 168 is eligible to be included in the State Scenic Highway System, and is officially designated as a scenic highway by the California Department of Transportation from Camp Sabrina to Brockman Lane on the Lone Pine Indian Reservation.

Two portions of SR 168 are designated as National Forest Scenic Byways: the segment between Clovis and Huntington Lake is the Sierra Heritage Scenic Byway, while the segment from Camp Sabrina to Brockman Lane is the Ancient Bristlecone Scenic Byway.

== History ==
The eastern part of the route, from the eastern over Westgard Pass to the Nevada state line near Lida, Nevada predates the era of numbered highways and dates to the auto trail era as part of the Midland Trail, one of the earliest transcontinental roads in the USA. It was at Big Pine that the Midland trail forked in its westward journey to its eventual western termini, Los Angeles and San Francisco. The western descent from Westgard Pass into the Owens Valley was described as a "Welcome to California" view in the route guides for the Midland trail. Though SR 168 is the original routing of the Midland Trail, the route was realigned numerous times, and signs today mark U.S. Route 6 as the routing of the Midland Trail from California east to Denver, Colorado.

When the state of California began conceiving its own route network, modern SR 168 was conceived as a trans-Sierra highway connecting Fresno and Bishop. The proposed route, named the High Sierra Piute Highway, would have taken the highway over the 11,453-foot (3,491 m) Piute Pass, over 1,400 ft (430 m) higher than Tioga Pass, the current highest highway-traversed pass. However, the two segments were never connected. The rugged Sierra crest and eastern escarpment would have made construction very difficult and today two congressionally designated wilderness areas block the way: Kings Canyon National Park and the John Muir Wilderness. The traversable route now comprises Kaiser Pass Road from Huntington Lake to Florence Lake, various hiking trails from Florence Lake and through the Piute Pass to North Lake, and North Lake Road to a point along SR 168 east of where the highway connects to Lake Sabrina.

As originally designated SR 168 extended to the Nevada state line. The easternmost section of SR 168 was transferred to California State Route 266 in 1986.

== Major intersections ==
Except where prefixed with a letter, postmiles were measured on the road as it was in 1964, based on the alignment that existed at the time, and do not necessarily reflect current mileage. Postmile prefixes include: R reflecting a realignment in the route since then, M indicating a second realignment, L referring to an overlap due to a correction or change, and T indicating postmiles classified as temporary. Segments that remain unconstructed or have been relinquished to local control may be omitted. The numbers reset at county lines; the start and end postmiles in each county are given in the county column.

County	Location	Postmile	Exit	Destinations	Notes
Fresno; FRE R0.29-65.84	Fresno	R0.29	1	SR 41 (Yosemite Freeway) / SR 180 (Sequoia-Kings Canyon Freeway) – Lemoore, Paso Robles, Yosemite, Kings Canyon, Kerman, Mendota	Westbound exit and eastbound entrance; signed as exits 1A (SR 180 west) and 1B (SR 180 east); west end of SR 168; SR 41 exit 128A; SR 180 east exit 60A, west exit 60
Fresno; FRE R0.29-65.84	Fresno	R0.99	1C	McKinley Avenue	Signed as exit 1 eastbound; serves Fresno Yosemite International Airport
Fresno; FRE R0.29-65.84	Fresno	R2.02	2	Shields Avenue	
Fresno; FRE R0.29-65.84	Fresno	R3.04	3	Ashlan Avenue	
Fresno; FRE R0.29-65.84	Fresno	R4.26	4	Shaw Avenue	Former SR 168; serves California State University, Fresno
Fresno; FRE R0.29-65.84	Clovis	R5.63	6	Bullard Avenue	
Fresno; FRE R0.29-65.84	Clovis	R6.87	7	Herndon Avenue	
Fresno; FRE R0.29-65.84	Clovis	R8.04	8	Fowler Avenue	
Fresno; FRE R0.29-65.84	Clovis	R9.15	9	Temperance Avenue	Serves Clovis Community Medical Center
Fresno; FRE R0.29-65.84	Clovis	R10.59		Owens Mountain Parkway, Tollhouse Road west	East end of freeway
Fresno; FRE R0.29-65.84	Clovis	R11.85		Shephard Avenue	
Fresno; FRE R0.29-65.84		15.47		Academy Avenue – Sanger, Kingsburg	
Fresno; FRE R0.29-65.84		T22.70		Tollhouse Road east	Connects northeast to Tollhouse
Fresno; FRE R0.29-65.84		T24.70		Millerton Road – Friant	
Fresno; FRE R0.29-65.84	Prather	T30.20		Auberry Road – Millerton Lake	
Fresno; FRE R0.29-65.84		R36.18		Tollhouse Road west	Connects southwest to Tollhouse
Fresno; FRE R0.29-65.84	Huntington Lake	65.84		Kaiser Pass Road – Mono Hot Springs, Edison Lake, Florence Lake	East end of western section of SR 168
Fresno; FRE R0.29-65.84	Huntington Lake	65.84		Huntington Lake Road – Huntington Lake	Continuation beyond the east end of western section of SR 168
Gap in route
Inyo; INY R0.00-54.70		R0.00		Lake Sabrina (Lake Sabrina Road)	Continuation beyond the west end of eastern section of SR 168
Inyo; INY R0.00-54.70		R1.25	Westbound winter closure gate		
Inyo; INY R0.00-54.70	Bishop	18.31 115.40 (Note: Indicates that the postmile represents the distance along US 395 rather than SR 168.)		US 395 north (Main Street) / East Line Street – Bridgeport, Reno	West end of US 395 overlap; former US 6 north; East Line Street serves Eastern Sierra Regional Airport
Inyo; INY R0.00-54.70	Big Pine	100.83 18.32		US 395 south / County Road – Big Pine, Independence, Los Angeles	East end of US 395 overlap; former US 6 south
Inyo; INY R0.00-54.70		20.81		Death Valley Road – Saline Valley, Eureka Valley, Scotty's Castle	
Inyo; INY R0.00-54.70		32.23	Westgard Pass, elevation 7,271 feet (2,216 m)		
Mono; MNO 0.00-1.45	Oasis	1.45		SR 266 to US 95 – Dyer	East end of SR 168; SR 266 north is former SR 168 east
1.000 mi = 1.609 km; 1.000 km = 0.621 mi: Concurrency terminus
