= Bishop Pass =

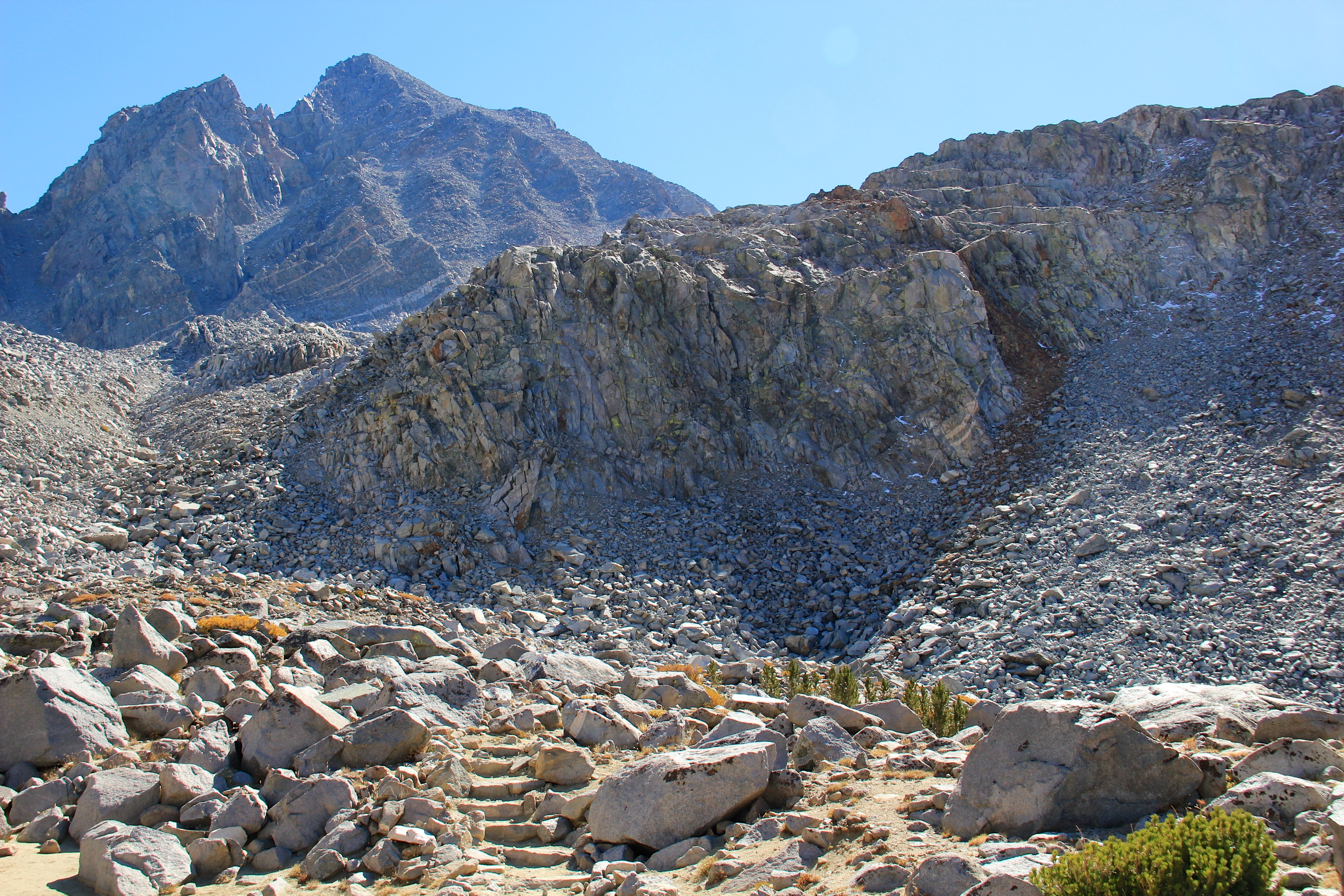
- Bishop Pass Trail
- Interactive map of Bishop Pass
- Elevation: 11,972 ft (3,649 m)
- Traversed by: Bishop Pass Trail

Third Approach
- Location: Inyo and Fresno Counties, California
- Range: Sierra Nevada
- Coordinates: 37°06′53″N 118°32′41″W

Bishop Pass, 11,972 ft (3,649 m), is a high mountain pass in the southern Sierra Nevada, California, on the border of the Inyo National Forest (John Muir Wilderness) on the north and Kings Canyon National Park on the south. The Bishop Pass Trail goes over the pass, connecting the Bishop Creek valley in the north (accessed via South Lake Road off Highway 168) with the John Muir Trail/Pacific Crest Trail in the south. The pass is located just to the west of Mount Agassiz, south of Picture Puzzle Peak, and east-southeast of Mount Goode, and is surrounded by many alpine lakes in the Dusy Basin and the Bishop Lake basin.
