= Prather, California =

Unincorporated community in California, United States

Prather
- Unincorporated community
- Location in California Prather (the United States)
- Coordinates: 37°02′15″N 119°30′50″W
- Country: United States
- State: California
- County: Fresno
- Elevation: 1,657 ft (505 m)

Prather is an unincorporated community in Fresno County, California, United States. It is located 25 miles (40 km) northeast of Fresno, at an elevation of 1,657 ft (505 m). Prather has a population of 1,569.

The post office in Prather first opened in 1914, closed in 1935, re-opened in 1936, and moved in 1939. The name honors Joseph L. Prather who came to California in 1872 and whose ranch became the site of the town. It is the last community on California State Route 168 before the route climbs into the Sierras, passing Shaver Lake and Huntington Lake.
