= National Park to Park Highway =

Informal auto trail connecting national parks in the western United States

Coordinates: 44°28′N 110°5′W

National Park to Park Highway
- Slogan: You Sing "America", Why Not See It?

Route information
- Length: 5,600 mi (9,000 km) Based on 1920 dedication tour
- Existed: 1916 / 1920–present

Location
- Country: United States
- States: California, Oregon, Washington, Idaho, Montana, Wyoming, Colorado, New Mexico, Arizona, Nevada, Utah

Highway system
- Auto trails

The National Park-to-Park Highway was an auto trail in the United States in the 1910s and 1920s, plotted by A. L. Westgard. It followed a large loop through the West, connecting twelve national parks:

- Rocky Mountain National Park
- Yellowstone National Park
- Glacier National Park
- Mount Rainier National Park
- Crater Lake National Park
- Lassen Volcanic National Park
- Yosemite National Park
- General Grant National Park (now part of Kings Canyon)
- Sequoia National Park
- Zion National Park
- Grand Canyon National Park
- Mesa Verde National Park

== History ==
In 1914, Secretary of the Interior Franklin Lane entered into an agreement with the Office of Public Roads to develop road access to Glacier, Sequoia and Yosemite National Parks. When Stephen T. Mather became involved with the national parks, he invited the Office of Public Roads Engineer T. Warren Allen to speak at the 1915 Berkeley National Parks Conference. Mather had concerns over letting the Office of Public Roads develop highway systems within the national parks. While Allen's approach to public roads saw no difference between national forests and national parks, his involvement was an early indication of the public interest in driving.

It was the following year that Mather joined the campaign for the Park-to-Park Highway. The National Park-to-Park Highway Association was formed in 1916 and began promoting roads and roadway improvements in the Northwest and Rocky Mountain states. Other highway associations had been supporting a variety of routes linking the scenic wonders of the western national parks. In 1915, a Denver group of motorists took off on a 500 miles (800 km) journey from Rocky Mountain National Park to Yellowstone. The Interstate Wonderland Trail Association was already promoting the next segment of the journey from Yellowstone to Glacier and then westward to Mount Rainier.

In 1917, the Parks Highway Association began marking the route from Glacier to Mount Rainier and added a southern segment to Crater Lake. By 1919, there were annual meetings of the National Park-to-Park supporters. That same year, Charles Goodwin was assigned as Superintendent at Glacier. Here, he began to work on developing potential routes through the park. When Mather's preference for an east-west link across the park was made known, he began looking for a route to link the two sides that would complement the Park-to-Park Highway. This route would become the Going-to-the-Sun Road.

By 1920, eleven states were involved in the Park-to-Park Highway program. The proposed route would cover 6,000 miles (9,700 km) of roads and numerous feeders to and from the various national parks.
