= A. L. Westgard =

Highway pioneer and photographer

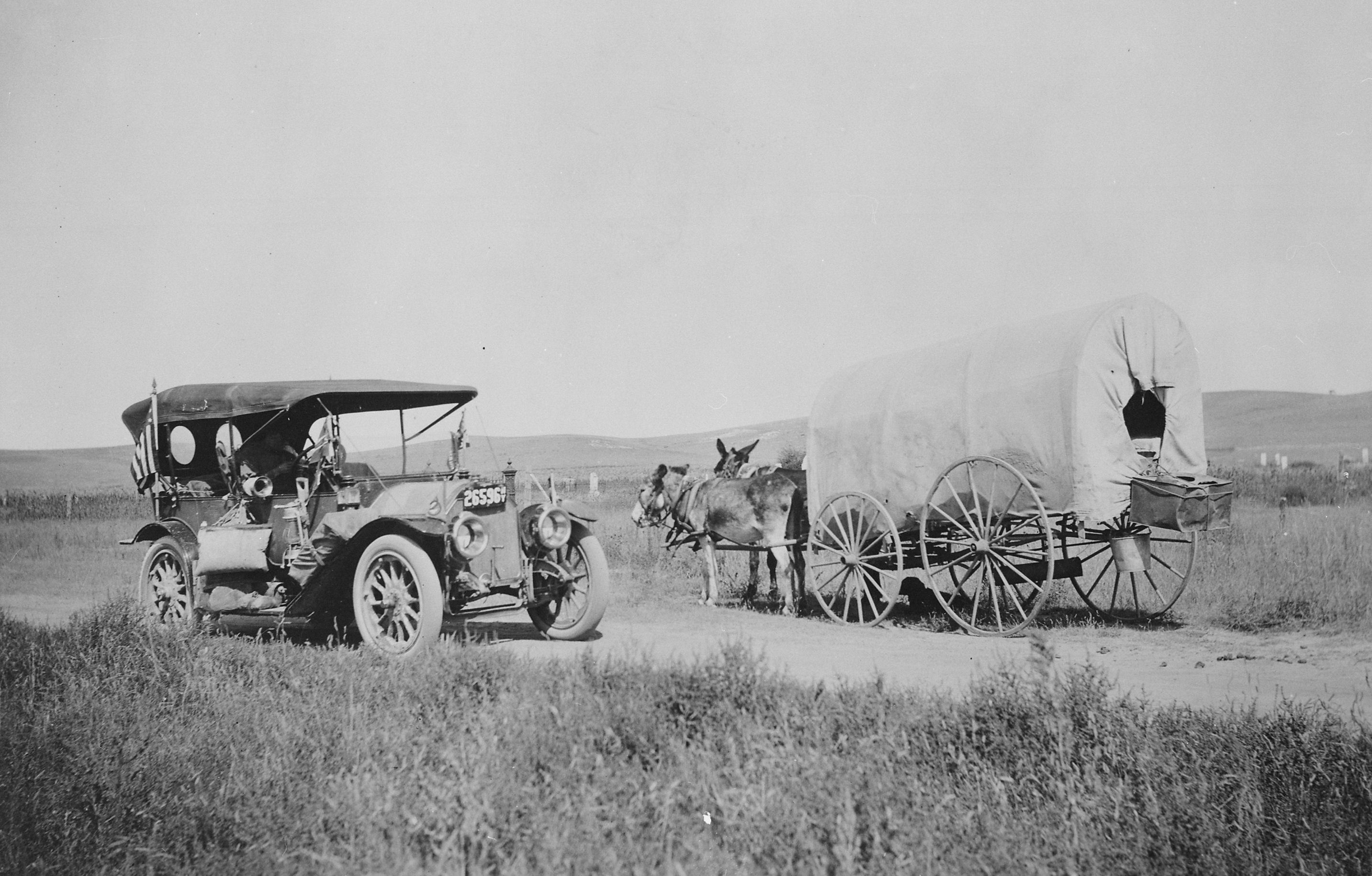
Covered wagon with jackrabbit mules encounters an automobile on the trail near Big Springs, Nebraska by A. L. Westgard, 1912

Anton L. Westgard (1865 in Norway – 3 April 1921), called "the Pathfinder", was a highway pioneer and photographer.

Westgard was appointed by Federal Highway Administration Director Logan Page to research appropriate locations for the first transcontinental highways. Westgard's 1911 cross-country field survey via automobile ultimately led to what would become the Lincoln Highway. Westgard also mapped the National Park to Park Highway for the Automobile Association of America in 1920.

Westgard Pass between the White and Inyo mountain ranges in the Basin and Range Province of California is named after Westgard.

== Published works ==
- "Motor Routes to the California Expositions" by A. L. Westgard, Motor Magazine, March 1915.
