= Soldier Pass =

Coordinates: 37°20′49″N 117°58′30″W

Soldier Pass, is a gap at an elevation of 5,479 feet, (1670m) in Inyo County, California.
