= Aspendell, California =

Unincorporated community in California, United States

Aspendell
- Unincorporated community
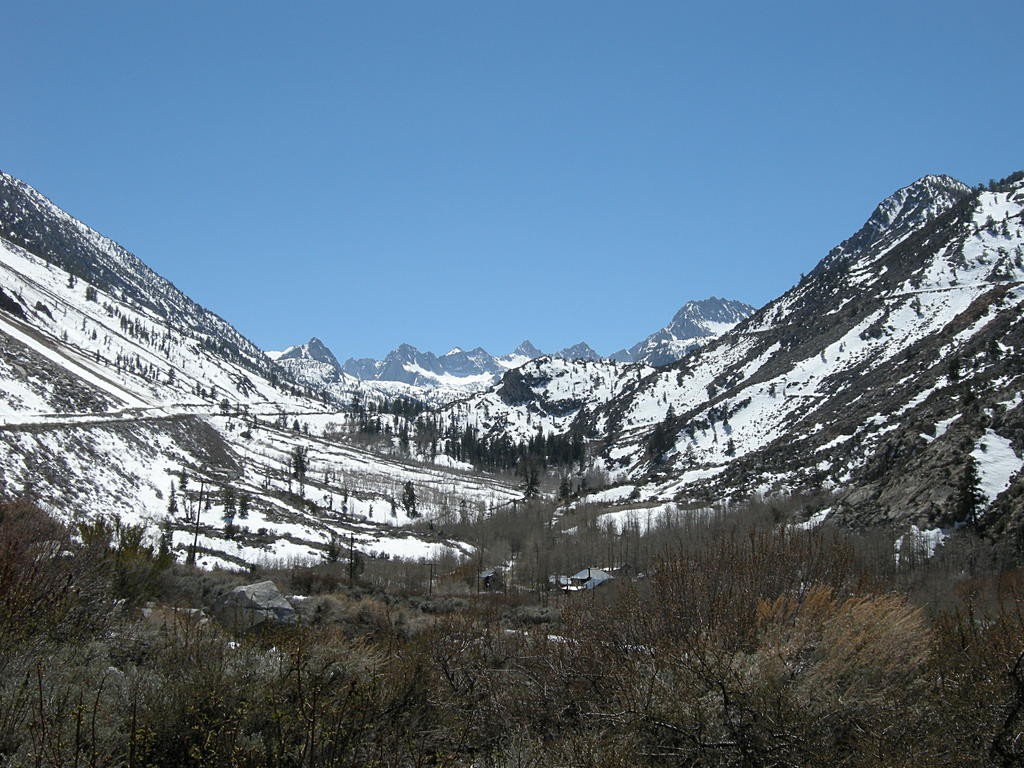
- California State Highway 168, heading up Bishop Creek

- Location in California Aspendell (the United States)
- Coordinates: 37°14′17″N 118°35′54″W
- Country: United States
- State: California
- County: Inyo
- Elevation: 8,409 ft (2,563 m)
- GNIS feature ID: 1667268

Aspendell is an unincorporated community in Inyo County, California, United States, located at 8,409 feet above sea level, with a population of 70 people. The town was developed in 1961 by Gene Scherer.

Aspendell is located 17 miles from the town of Bishop and is a popular tourist destination, known in the fall for its Aspen trees, the winter for Winter sports and in the summer for Hiking, Fishing, and Camping opportunities. Local destinations include Intake II, Lake Sabrina, North Lake, and multiple campgrounds. There is little to no cell phone reception, nor gas stations after leaving Bishop.

The seasonal Cardinal Village Resort is the only store and hotel in the area, and was originally built as a part of a mining town after gold was discovered in Bishop Creek in 1885.

In the winter months, California State Route 168 is closed just south of Aspendell, preventing the ability to complete the remaining drive to Lake Sabrina and North Lake by vehicle.
