= Lake Sabrina =

Lake of the United States

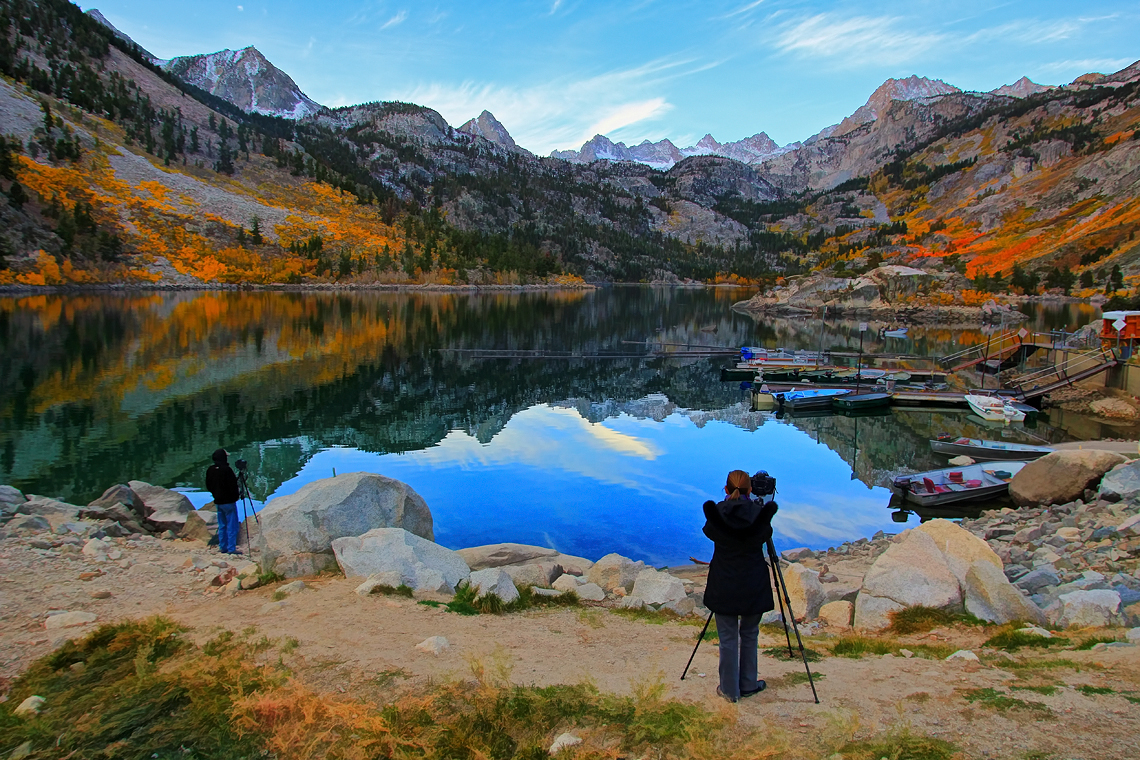

- Location within California Location within the United States
- Location: Inyo County, California
- Coordinates: 37°12′26″N 118°37′07″W
- Type: reservoir
- Primary outflows: Middle Fork Bishop Creek
- Catchment area: 15.1 square miles (39 km^{2})
- Basin countries: United States
- Built: 1907
- Surface area: 184 acres (74 ha)
- Water volume: 8,376 acre-feet (10.332×10^{6} m^{3})
- Surface elevation: 9,128 feet (2,782 m)

Lake Sabrina is a lake created by damming the middle fork of Bishop Creek. It is located south-west of Bishop, California on California State Route 168, in the Inyo National Forest. It has a cafe as well as a dock. The dam was built in 1907–8 to supply a constant flow of water to the hydraulic power plants. The lake is part of the Bishop Creek system.

Local residents pronounce the lake "Sah-bry-nuh;" however, the lake was originally named after Mrs. Sabrina (pronounced: suh-BREE-nuh) Hobbs, wife of C.M. Hobbs first General Manager of California Nevada Power Company which built the dam. The reason for the lake's name pronunciation changing over the years is unclear.

The segment of the State Route 168 from Lake Sabrina east to the community of Aspendell is subject to closure to most vehicles during the winter months, usually not opening until mid- or late-April, due to snow removal. The winter road closure gate is actually located to the southwest of Aspendell.

== See also ==
- List of dams and reservoirs in California
- List of lakes in California
