= Westgard Pass =

Mountain pass in Inyo County, California, United States

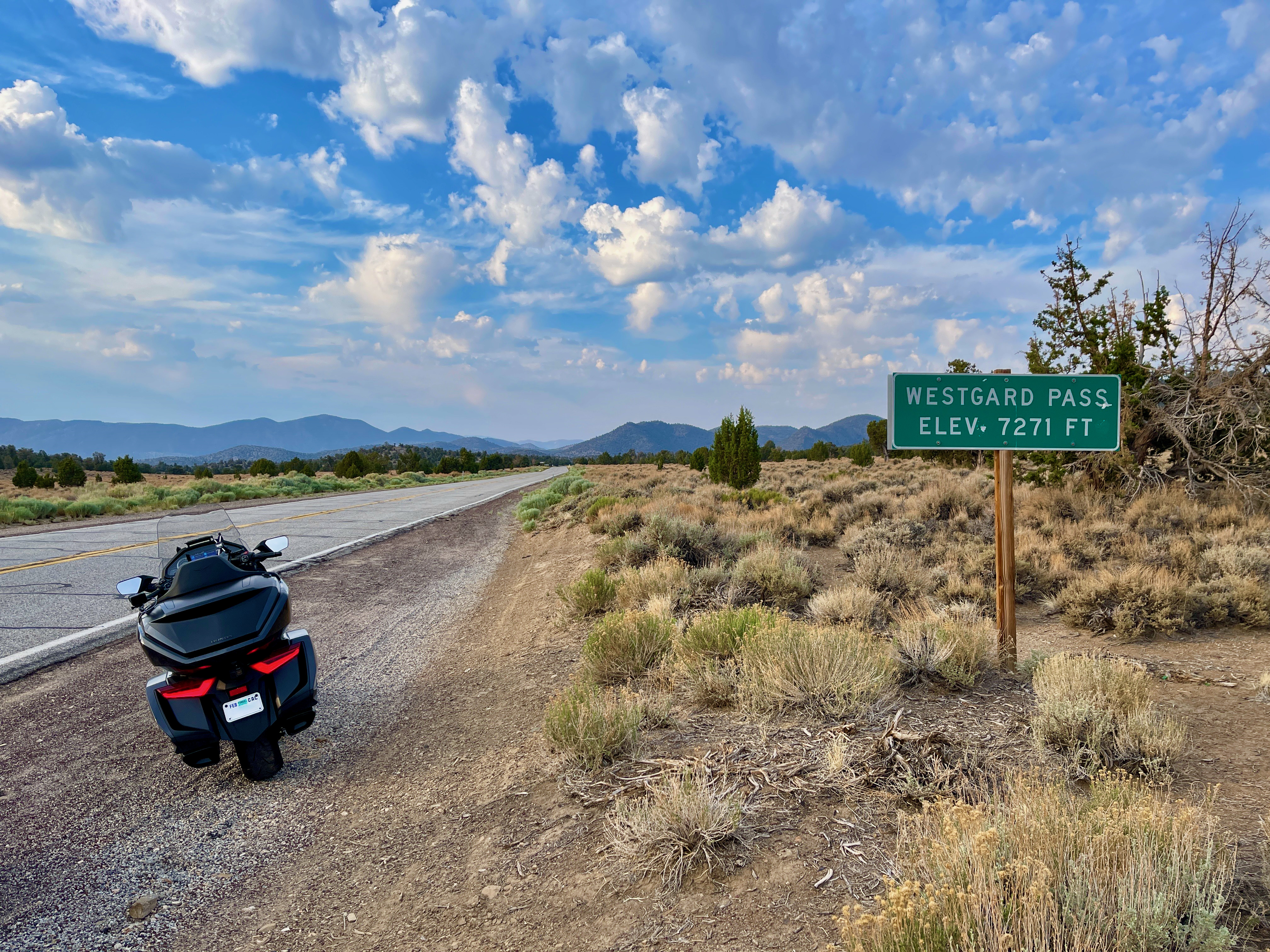
- Westgard Pass Sign on CA State Route 168

- Location within California
- Elevation: 7,323 ft (2,232 m)
- Traversed by: SR 168

Third Approach
- Location: Inyo County, California, United States
- Range: White Mountains/Inyo Mountains
- Coordinates: 37°18′01″N 118°09′14″W

Westgard Pass is a mountain pass on State Route 168 in Inyo County, California in the U.S. state of California. The pass lies at an elevation of 7,323 ft (2,232 m) and is located in between the White Mountains and Inyo Mountains ranges in the Basin and Range Province of eastern California. Westgard Pass lies entirely within the Inyo National Forest, in northern Inyo County, California.

State Route 168 crosses the pass, connecting the Owens Valley to Deep Springs Valley. Route 168 is the only (paved) east–west route across the Inyo-White Mountains. The highway is known for its pristine scenery and grand vistas.

== History ==
The pass was named after Anton L. Westgard, the Norwegian-born Vice President and Director of Transcontinental Highways of the National Highway Association. Inyo County and the State of California bestowed the honor on Westgard after his successful transcontinental journey by automobile in 1911. Westgard, nicknamed "The Pathfinder" was appointed by Federal Highway Administration Director Logan Page to attempt the trek as research for appropriate locations for the first transcontinental highways. This initial field survey ultimately led to what would eventually become the Lincoln Highway.

Although not the first transcontinental voyage by motorized vehicle, Westgard claimed to be the first to have completed the journey by truck, his being a 37-horsepower "Pioneer Freighter".

== See also ==
- List of mountain passes in California
