= Bishop Creek (Inyo County) =

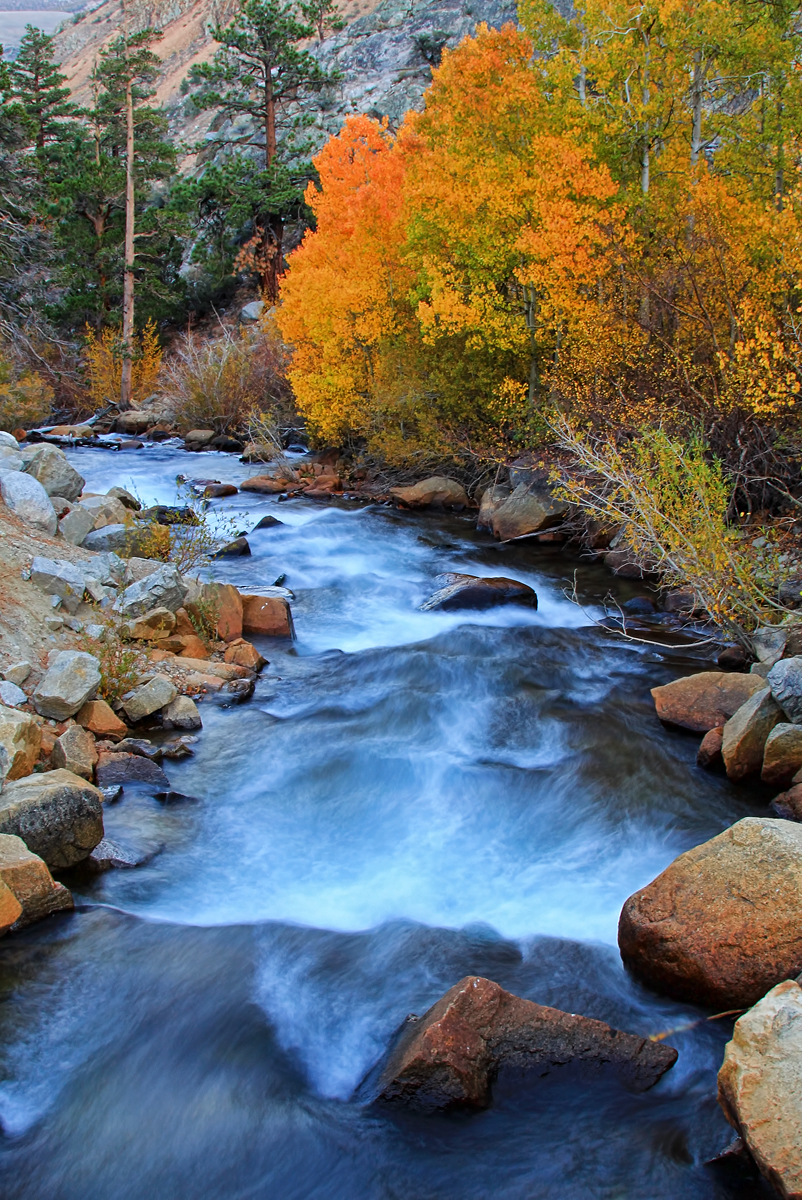
- North Fork Bishop Creek in the Fall

Physical characteristics
- Source
  - coordinates: 37°15′57″N 118°34′41″W
  - elevation: 7,400 feet (2,300 m)
- Mouth
  - location: Owens River
  - elevation: 4,482 feet (1,366 m)
- Discharge
  - average: 95 cubic feet per second (2.7 m^{3}/s)

Bishop Creek is also a dated variant of Baxter Creek in Richmond/El Cerrito, California

Bishop Creek is a 10.1-mile-long (16.3 km) stream in Inyo County, California. It is the largest tributary of the Owens River. It has five hydroelectric plants owned by Southern California Edison, Bishop Creek #2–6. Bishop Creek #1 was never completed. Parts of the creek run through pipelines, or penstocks, to increase output at the power plants.

== Geography ==
Bishop Creek has three forks, North, Middle and South. All have their headwaters in the eastern Sierra Nevada, near the border with Fresno County. The forks all flow into lakes while still at high elevations. The North Fork flows into North Lake, the Middle Fork flows into Lake Sabrina. The North and Middle forks combine above and flow through the community of Aspendell and below it the combined creeks are dammed at Intake Two, a reservoir. The South Fork flows into South Lake and continues through the community of South Fork (aka Habegger's) and then joins the Middle Fork below the Intake Two reservoir. Bishop Creek then begins its steep descent to the Owens Valley. The creek runs roughly North then Northeast and then continues East, flowing past the city of Bishop before its confluence with the Owens River.

== History ==
The creek was named after Owens Valley settler Samuel Addison Bishop.

=== Hurricane Olivia ===
In 1982, a dam burst in the Sierra Nevada mountains, causing 6 inches (152.4 mm) of water to enter into Bishop Creek. Up to 1,400 residents were evacuated from their homes into the nearby town of Bishop, California.

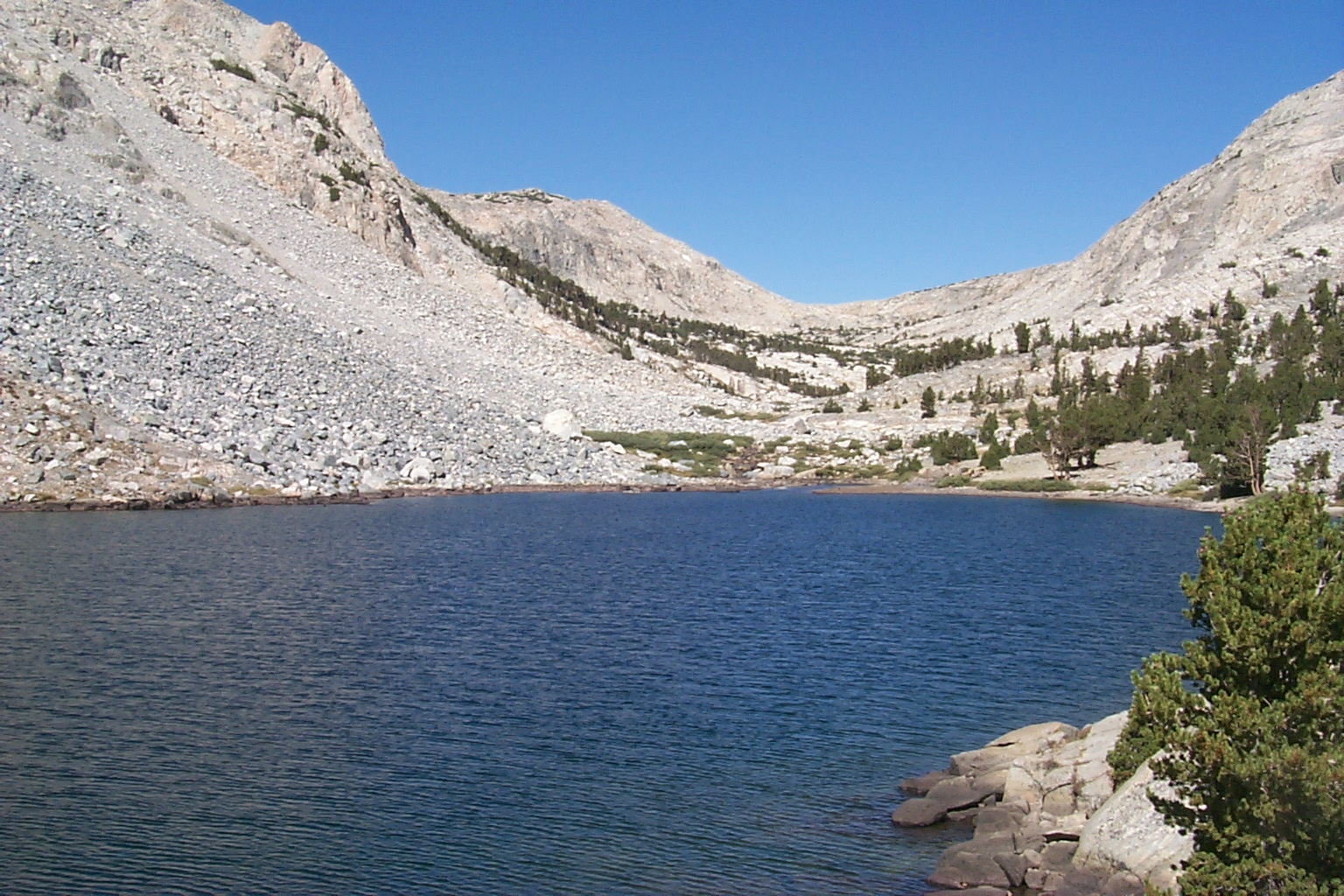
Loch Leven is a lake on North Fork Bishop Creek

== See also ==
- Lake Sabrina
- Intake Two
