= Mount Agassiz (California) =

Mountain of the Sierra Nevada in California, United States

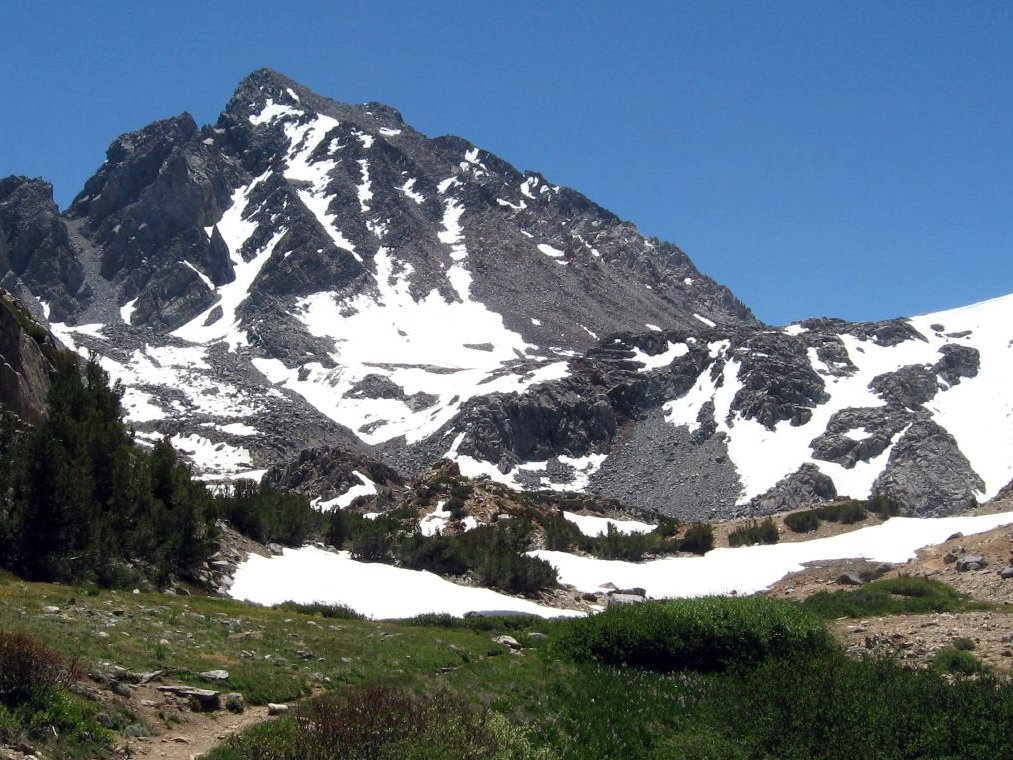
- Mount Agassiz from Bishop Pass Trail.

Highest point
- Elevation: 13,899 ft (4,236 m) NAVD 88
- Prominence: 893 ft (272 m)
- Parent peak: North Palisade
- Listing: Sierra Peaks Section; Western States Climbers Star peak
- Coordinates: 37°06′43″N 118°31′51″W

Geography
- Location within California Location within the United States
- Location: Fresno and Inyo counties, California, U.S.
- Parent range: Palisades, Sierra Nevada
- Topo map: USGS North Palisade

Climbing
- First ascent: August 30, 1925 by Norman Clyde
- Easiest route: West slope, scramble, (class 2)

Mount Agassiz, at 13,899 feet (4,236 m), is one of the 20 highest peaks of California. It is the northernmost and easiest to climb of the major Palisades summits. This peak is not to be confused with the 9,967-foot (3,038 m) peak by the same name in Desolation Wilderness, also in the California Sierra.

== Geography ==
Agassiz is at the north end of the Palisades in the eastern Sierra Nevada, near Bishop Pass. It stands on the boundary between Kings Canyon National Park and Inyo National Forest, and Fresno and Inyo counties.

== History ==
In 1879, Lilbourne Winchell named it Agassiz Needle for Harvard University professor of zoology and geology Louis Agassiz. Later, the USGS recognized it by its current name.

The peak is named after Swiss-American scientist Louis Agassiz. The name Agassiz Needle was originally applied to another nearby peak in 1879, likely Mount Winchell, but at some point the name moved to the current peak.

== Climbing ==
There are three major routes to Agassiz's summit. The easiest is the west slope, both for its non-technical ascent and proximity to the Bishop Pass Trail. From South Lake, the trail climbs gently to Bishop Pass, and the summit route begins there. An attempt to ascend from the west via a chute can lead off route, to areas requiring more technical mountaineering skills and equipment.

Another class 2 scrambling route is the southeast face by way of the south ridge, from Agassiz Col.

A more technical route is the northeast face, which requires class 4 climbing. Norman Clyde established it by following a canyon, couloir and arête from Fifth Lake.

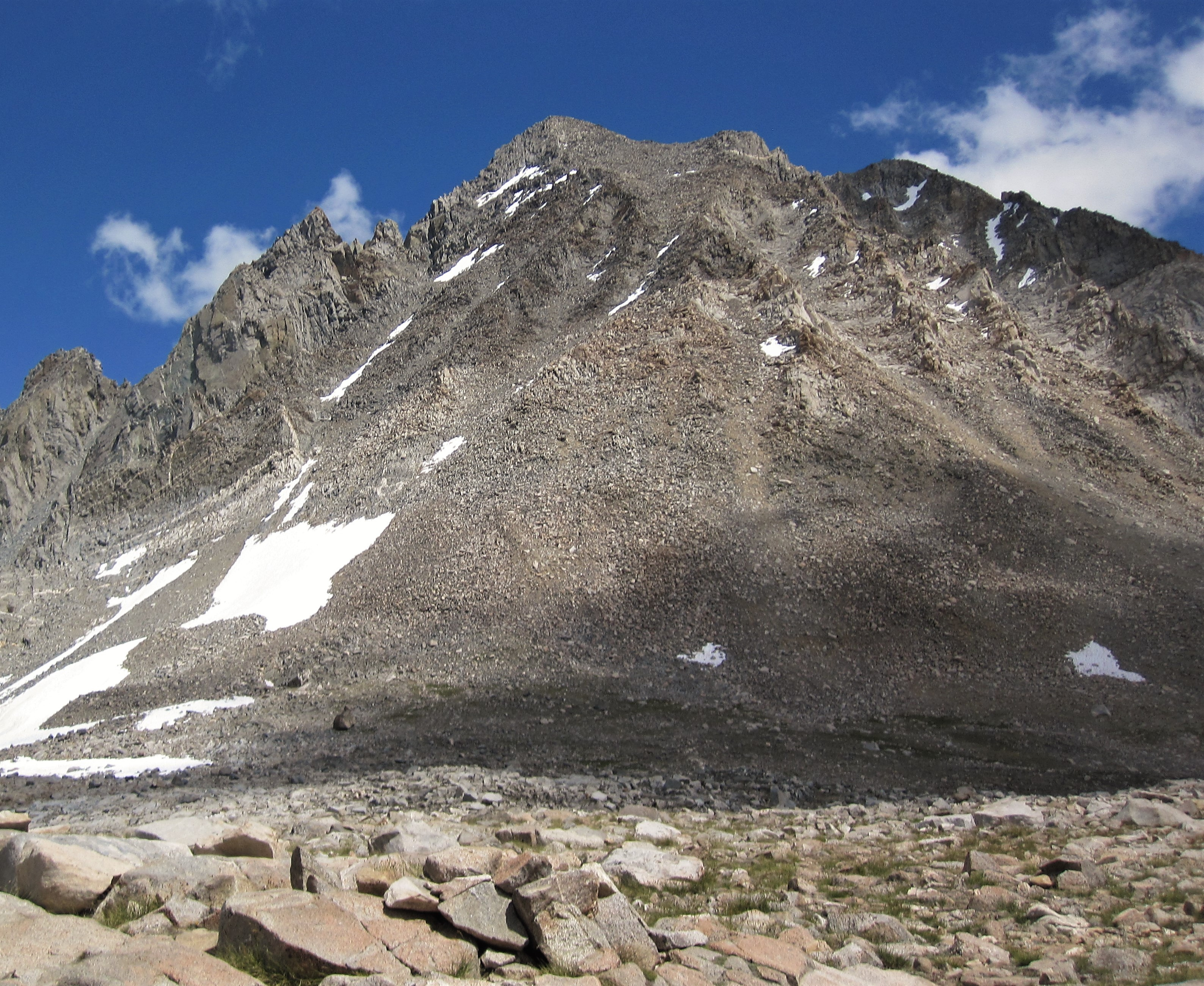
A view of Mount Agassiz from the west, near Bishop Pass, showing a talus slope and several chutes.

== See also ==
- Mountain peaks of California
- Palisades of the Sierra Nevada
