= Gilbert =

Gilbert may refer to:

== People and fictional characters ==
- Gilbert (given name), including a list of people and fictional characters
- Gilbert (surname), including a list of people

== Places ==
=== Australia ===
- Gilbert River (Queensland)
- Gilbert River (South Australia)

=== Kiribati ===
- Gilbert Islands, a chain of atolls and islands in the Pacific Ocean

=== United States ===
- Gilbert, Arizona, a town
- Gilbert, Arkansas, a town
- Gilbert, Florida, the airport of Winterhaven
- Gilbert, Iowa, a city
- Gilbert, Louisiana, a village
- Gilbert, Michigan, and unincorporated community
- Gilbert, Minnesota, a city
- Gilbert, Nevada, ghost town
- Gilbert, Ohio, an unincorporated community
- Gilbert, Pennsylvania, an unincorporated community
- Gilbert, South Carolina, a town
- Gilbert, West Virginia, a town
- Gilbert, Wisconsin, an unincorporated community
- Mount Gilbert (disambiguation), various mountains
- Gilbert River (Oregon)

=== Outer space ===
- Gilbert (lunar crater)
- Gilbert (Martian crater)

== Arts and entertainment ==
- Gilbert Collection, an art collection in the Victoria and Albert Museum
- Gilbert (band), a name used by English composer and musician Matthew Gilbert Linley
- Gilbert (film), a documentary on Gilbert Gottfried

== Education ==
- Gilbert Academy, a defunct private preparatory school for African Americans in Louisiana
- Gilbert School, a privately endowed secondary school that serves as the public high school for Winchester, Connecticut

== Ships ==
- USC&GS Gilbert, a survey ship of the United States Coast and Geodetic Survey
- US FWS Charles H. Gilbert, a fisheries research ship of the United States Fish and Wildlife Service and (as NOAAS Charles H. Gilbert) the National Oceanic and Atmospheric Administration

== Other uses ==
- A. C. Gilbert Company, an American toy company
- Gilbert (unit), a CGS unit of magnetomotive force
- Gilbert Building (disambiguation), several buildings on the American National Register of Historic Places
- Gilbert Cell, a transistor circuit used in communication electronics
- Gilbert Hill, a monolith column of black basalt rock in Andheri, India
- Gilbert House (disambiguation), various buildings
- Gilbert Model, a social class model
- Gilbert Rugby, an English sporting-goods manufacturer
- Gilbert's syndrome, a benign medical condition that may cause mild jaundice
- Gilbert (typeface), a typeface created in honor of artist Gilbert Baker
- Hurricane Gilbert, a 1988 Caribbean hurricane

== See also ==
- Gilberts (disambiguation)
- Fitzgilbert, including a list of people with the name
- Gilberto, a similar name
