= Gilbert House =

Gilbert House may refer to:

in the Falkland Islands

- Gilbert House (Falkland Islands), the premises of the Legislative Council of the Falkland Islands, in Stanley

in the United States (by state then city)

- Gilbert House, a Los Angeles Historic-Cultural Monument within Alvarado Terrace Historic District, Los Angeles, California
- Jeremiah S. Gilbert House, Atlanta, Georgia
- Henry Gilbert House, Kalamazoo, Michigan
- Giles Gilbert House, Stanton, Michigan
- Horace Gilbert House, Swartz Creek, Michigan
- Newington Gilbert House, Afton, Minnesota
- Elisha Gilbert House, New Lebanon, New York
- Northrup-Gilbert House, Phoenix, New York
- Philip E. Gilbert Houses, Dayton, Ohio, listed on the National Register of Historic Places (NRHP)
- Jane Gilbert House, Madison, Ohio, listed on the NRHP
- F. A. Gilbert House, Mansfield, Ohio, listed on the NRHP
- Gilbert House (Worthington, Ohio)
- Rev. William S. Gilbert House, Astoria, Oregon, listed on the NRHP
- Andrew T. Gilbert House, part of A. C. Gilbert's Discovery Village in Salem, Oregon
- J.B. Gilbert House, Hartsville, South Carolina
- Page-Gilbert House, Austin, Texas
- Samuel and Julia Gilbert House, Farmers Branch, Texas, listed on the NRHP
- H. M. Gilbert House, Yakima, Washington, listed on the NRHP
- John and Flora Gilbert House, Oregon, Wisconsin

== See also ==
- Gilbert Building (disambiguation)
- McGilbert House, Lufkin, Texas
