= Silver Peak, Nevada =

- Census-designated place
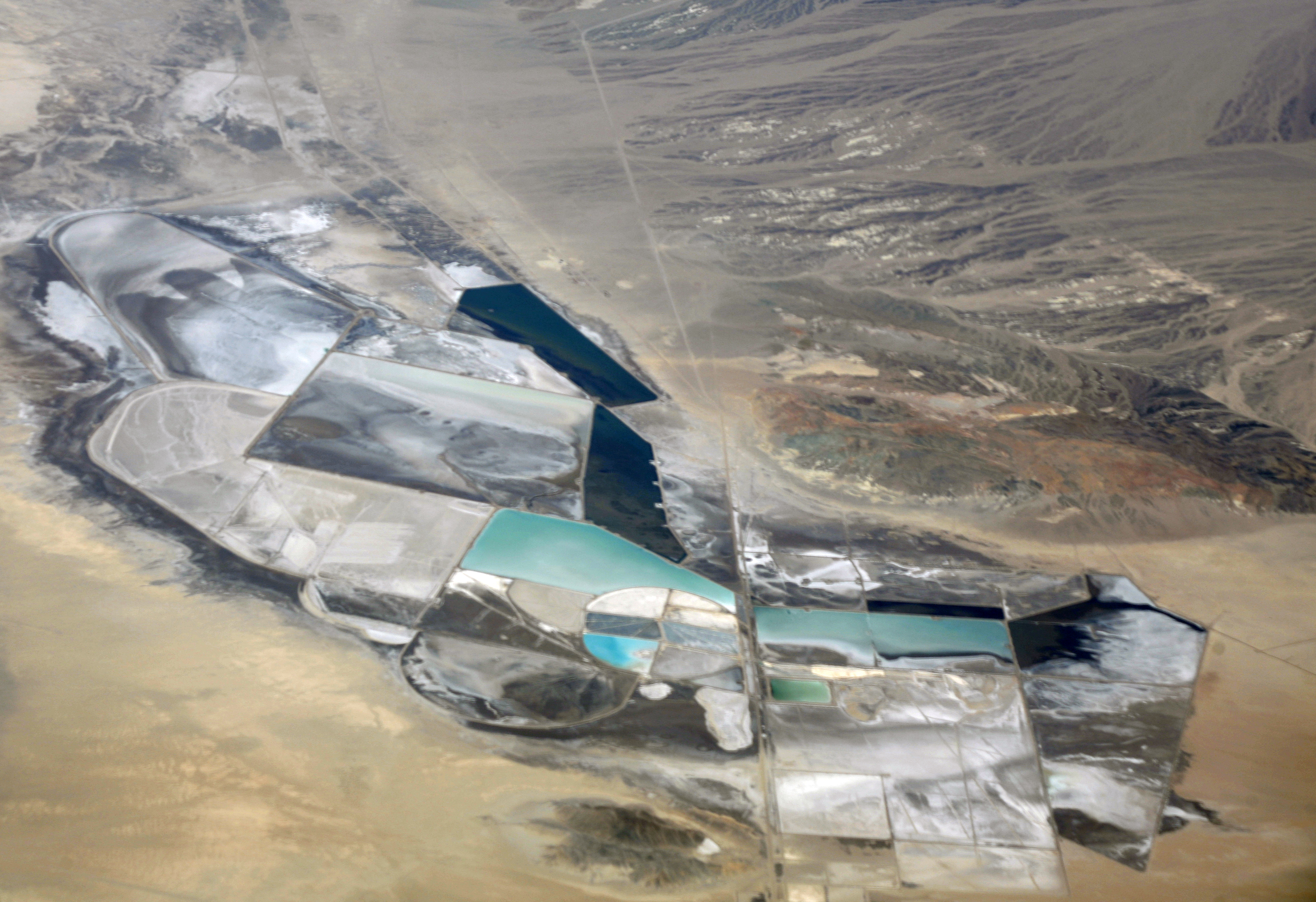
- Albemarle Corporation (Formerly Chemetall Foote) Lithium Operation at Silver Peak

- Location within the state of Nevada
- Coordinates: 37°45′18″N 117°38′5″W
- Country: United States
- State: Nevada
- County: Esmeralda

Area
  - Total: 0.99 sq mi (2.56 km^{2})
  - Land: 0.99 sq mi (2.56 km^{2})
  - Water: 0 sq mi (0.00 km^{2})
- Elevation: 4,321 ft (1,317 m)

Population (2020)
  - Total: 121
  - Density: 122.2/sq mi (47.18/km^{2})
- Time zone: UTC-8 (Pacific (PST))
  - Summer (DST): UTC-7 (PDT)
- ZIP code: 89047
- FIPS code: 32-67000
- GNIS feature ID: 845661

Silver Peak (also Silverpeak) is an unincorporated community and census-designated place (CDP) in Esmeralda County, Nevada, United States. It lies along State Route 265, 20 miles (32 km) south of U.S. Route 6 and 30 miles (48 km) west of Goldfield, the county seat of Esmeralda County. It has a post office, with the ZIP code of 89047. As of the 2020 census, Silver Peak had a population of 121.

== Demographics ==
Historical population
Census	Pop.	Note	%±
2000	182		—
2010	107		−41.2%
2020	121		13.1%
U.S. Decennial Census

== History ==
Silver Peak is one of the oldest mining communities in Nevada. It was founded near a well in 1864, two years after the founding of surrounding Esmeralda County, and one year after silver was discovered nearby and mining began. A 10 stamp mill was built in 1865, and a 20 stamp mill by 1867. The Silver Peak Railroad was built by the Pittsburgh Silver Peak Gold Mining Company after it bought a group of mining properties in 1906 and established a 100 stamp mill at Blair, Nevada, in 1907. Blair's mill closed in 1915, and Blair was a ghost town by 1920. Silver Peak maintained a population, however, even though it burned in 1948.

In 1939, boxer Max Baer defeated "Big Ed" Murphy of Silver Peak in a one round fight at Silver Peak.

== Climate ==
Silver Peak has a cold desert climate (Köppen: BWk) with cold winters and hot summers.

Climate data for Silver Peak, Nevada, 1991–2020 normals, extremes 1967–present
Month	Jan	Feb	Mar	Apr	May	Jun	Jul	Aug	Sep	Oct	Nov	Dec	Year
Record high °F (°C)	72 (22)	77 (25)	87 (31)	91 (33)	102 (39)	110 (43)	111 (44)	111 (44)	104 (40)	104 (40)	79 (26)	69 (21)	111 (44)
Mean daily maximum °F (°C)	46.4 (8.0)	52.9 (11.6)	61.6 (16.4)	67.7 (19.8)	77.9 (25.5)	89.2 (31.8)	96.7 (35.9)	94.6 (34.8)	85.4 (29.7)	71.6 (22.0)	56.5 (13.6)	44.8 (7.1)	70.4 (21.3)
Daily mean °F (°C)	32.6 (0.3)	38.6 (3.7)	47.1 (8.4)	53.4 (11.9)	63.5 (17.5)	73.3 (22.9)	79.9 (26.6)	77.6 (25.3)	68.3 (20.2)	54.8 (12.7)	41.5 (5.3)	31.2 (−0.4)	55.2 (12.9)
Mean daily minimum °F (°C)	18.8 (−7.3)	24.3 (−4.3)	32.7 (0.4)	39.2 (4.0)	49.0 (9.4)	57.3 (14.1)	63.2 (17.3)	60.7 (15.9)	51.3 (10.7)	38.0 (3.3)	26.5 (−3.1)	17.6 (−8.0)	39.9 (4.4)
Record low °F (°C)	−22 (−30)	−21 (−29)	4 (−16)	14 (−10)	19 (−7)	24 (−4)	39 (4)	30 (−1)	28 (−2)	10 (−12)	−2 (−19)	−14 (−26)	−22 (−30)
Average precipitation inches (mm)	0.27 (6.9)	0.40 (10)	0.50 (13)	0.47 (12)	0.32 (8.1)	0.24 (6.1)	0.69 (18)	0.41 (10)	0.24 (6.1)	0.30 (7.6)	0.27 (6.9)	0.22 (5.6)	4.33 (110)
Average precipitation days (≥ 0.01 in)	1.9	3.2	3.0	2.2	3.0	1.3	3.4	2.2	2.1	2.3	1.6	1.8	28.0
Source: NOAA

== Economy ==
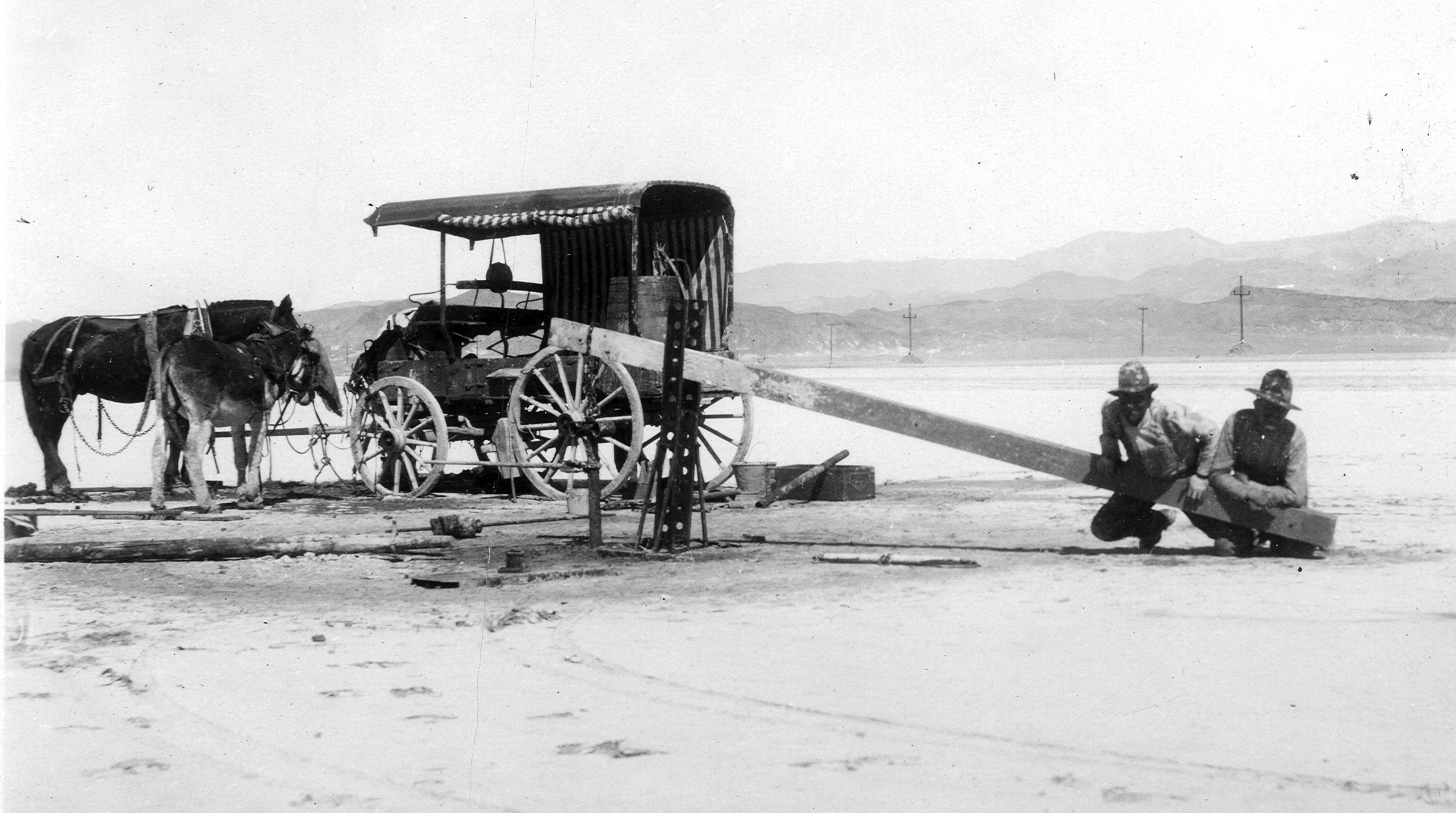
Drill test in Silver Peak dry lake, 1912

Silver Peak lies near a dry lake bed that is rich in lithium and other minerals.

Initially salt was mined in the area. In 1906, Spurr reported that salt was mined for local use by digging a hole a foot or two deep until water was reached and then waiting until the water evaporated. It was claimed that the salt produced in this manner was 99% pure.

During World War II, Clayton Marsh was explored for strategic minerals including potash and American Potash Corp. leased the marsh. In the 1950s, Leprechaun Mining (Clyde Kegel) acquired the leases. He determined that in addition to potassium, lithium was also present. Leprechaun Mining reached an agreement with Foote Minerals in 1964 and Foote reconfigured the silver mill and started production of lithium in 1967. In 1988, Cyprus Minerals acquired Foote and became Cyprus Foot Minerals. In 1998, Chemetall acquired the operation – the new company was called Chemetall Foote Corp. In 2004, Rockwood Holdings acquired the operation. In 2010, the mine was expanded to double the capacity of its lithium carbonate production. The project was funded in part by a $28.4 million grant from the U.S. Department of Energy to expand and upgrade the production of lithium materials for advanced transportation batteries. In 2014, the Albemarle Corporation purchased Rockwood for $6.2 Billion.

As of October 2021, the Albemarle Corporation Lithium Operation at Silver Peak employs around 100 people extracting heavy brine and is currently the only operating source of lithium in the United States, and supplying 1% of the world's output.

== In popular culture ==
The town was featured on a show called "Welcome To Murdertown" which revolves around the disappearance and murder of Charlie Kinkle by Jason Taaffe and Coleman Ward.

During California's 1999 electric power crisis in the first major act of the power crisis causing an outage on March 25, 1999, Enron energy traders allegedly rerouted 2,900MW (megawatts) of electricity destined for California to this small Nevada community. This caused a large shortage on the California power grid because the largest power feeder (intertie) from this area to California had a capacity of 15MW (about 0.5% of the required wheeling capacity).

== Education ==
Residents are zoned to the Esmeralda County School District for grades K-8.

High school students in the entire county go to Tonopah High School of Nye County School District.
