= Blair, Nevada =

Blair
- Ghost town
- Etymology: Named for John Insley Blair, Banker and Financier from New York and Blairstown, New Jersey
- Location within Nevada
- Coordinates: 37°47′35″N 117°38′57″W
- Country: United States
- State: Nevada
- County: Esmeralda
- Elevation: 4,616 ft (1,407 m)
- Time zone: UTC-8 (Pacific (PST))
  - Summer (DST): PDT (UTC-7)

Blair is a mining ghost town in Esmeralda County, Nevada.

== History ==
Today a historical marker commemorates Blair along State Route 265 just north of Silver Peak. At one time Blair was a thriving, albeit short-lived, mining boom town. As mining reached a fever pitch in Nevada during the Tonopah boom, the effects spidered out in all directions to revive many a dormant mining town. Nearby, in Silver Peak, land speculators were driving land prices so artificially high that the 100-stamp mill planned for Silver Peak was relocated and built a mile and a half west, where it became the hub of Blair. It was the Pittsburg-Silver Peak Gold Mining Company that was responsible for the large mill that went up in 1907; at the time it was Nevada's largest such facility. They constructed the 17 and half mile Silver Peak Railroad the previous year.

Blair had a post office from November 1906 to December 1915.

The Blair Press newspaper operated from about November 3, 1906 until July 23, 1909 and then from September 3, 1909 until June 17, 1910. The Silver Peak Post moved from Silver Peak, Nevada to Blair in January 1907 and was renamed the Blair Booster on March 13, 1907. The Blair Booster failed on June 12, 1907 and the plant was moved to Millers, Nevada.

By 1920, Blair was a ghost town. Besides the historical marker the only reminders of the town are the remains of stone buildings and the foundation of the old mill.

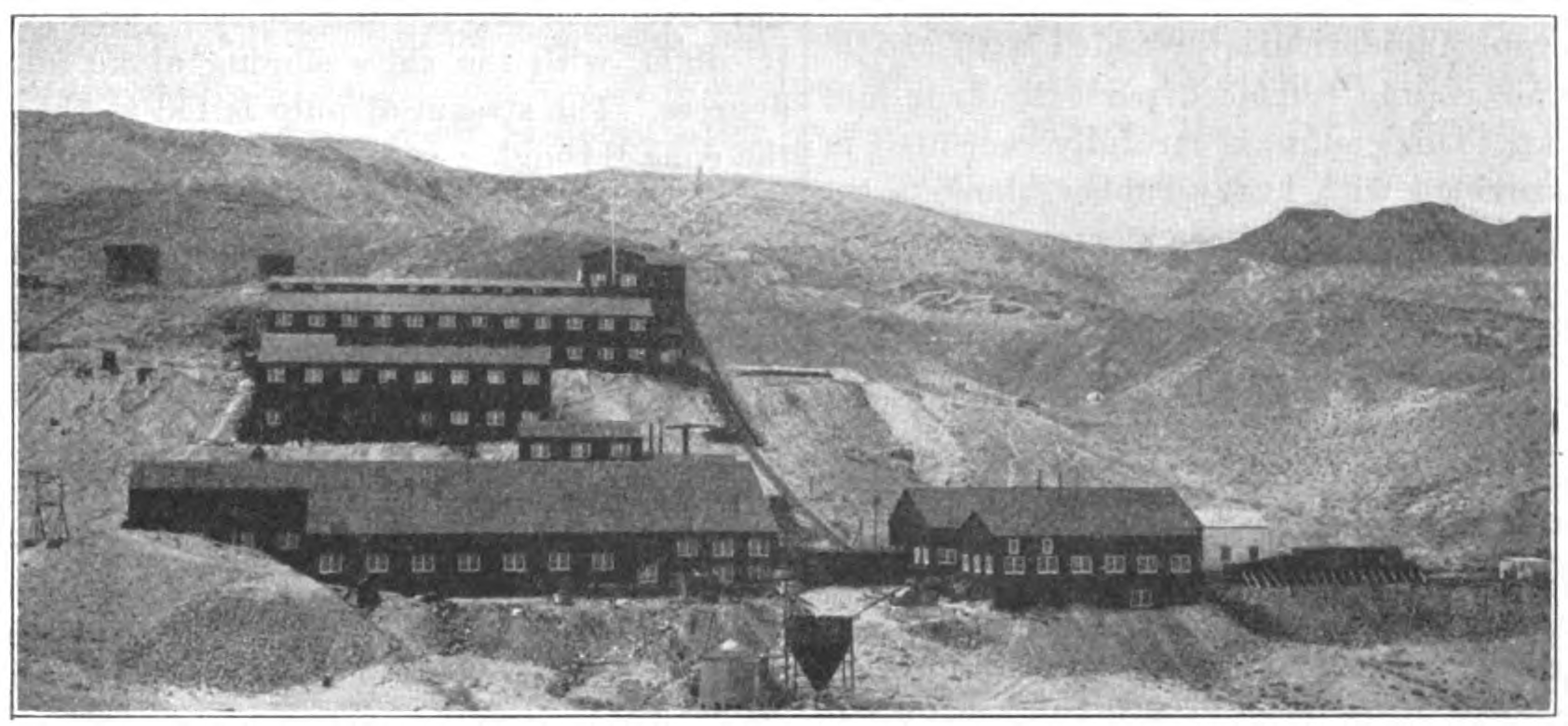
Silver Peak Mill, Blair, Nevada, 1909.

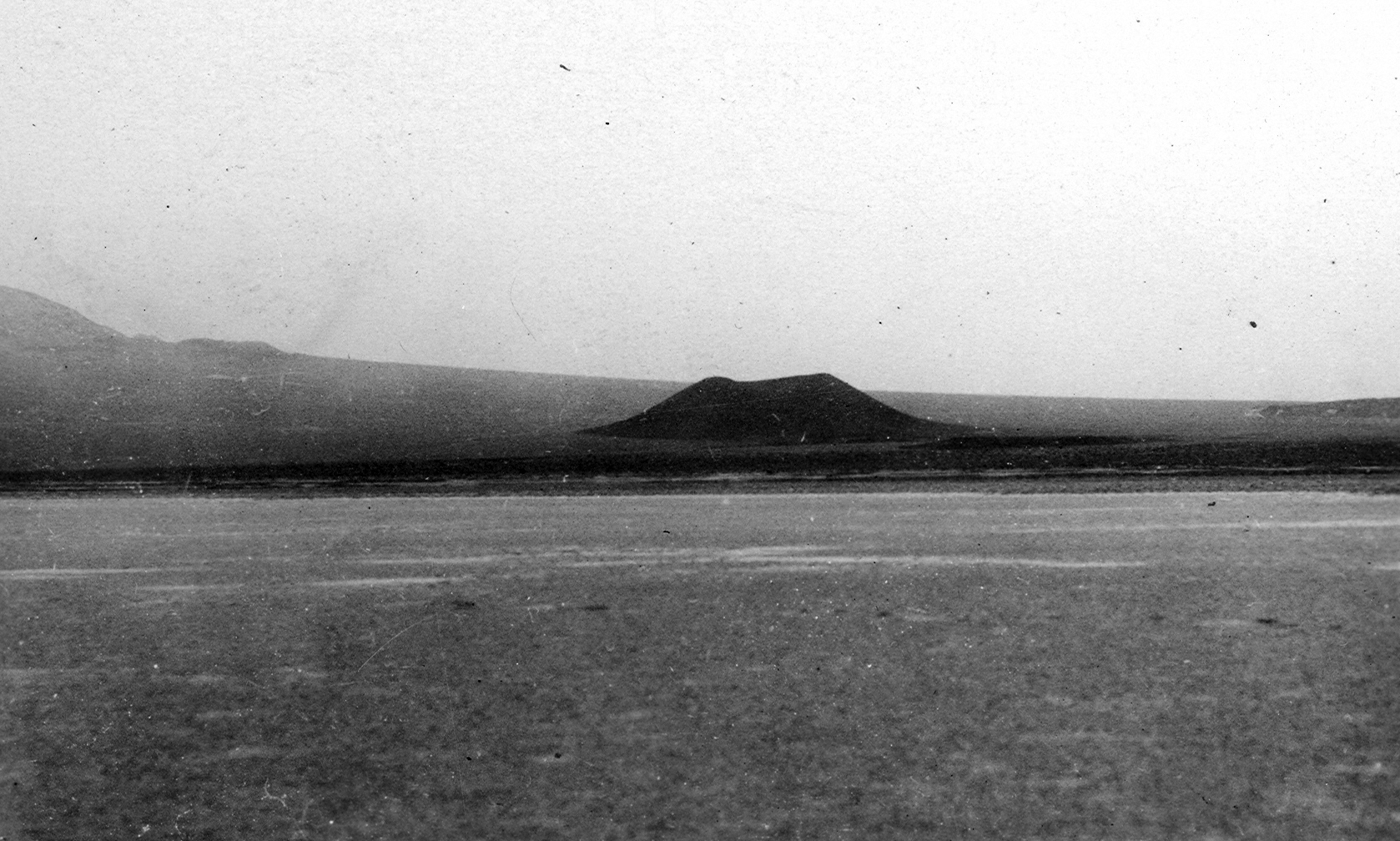
Cinder cone on Pleistocene wash, northeast of Blair. Esmeralda County, Nevada. 1912.

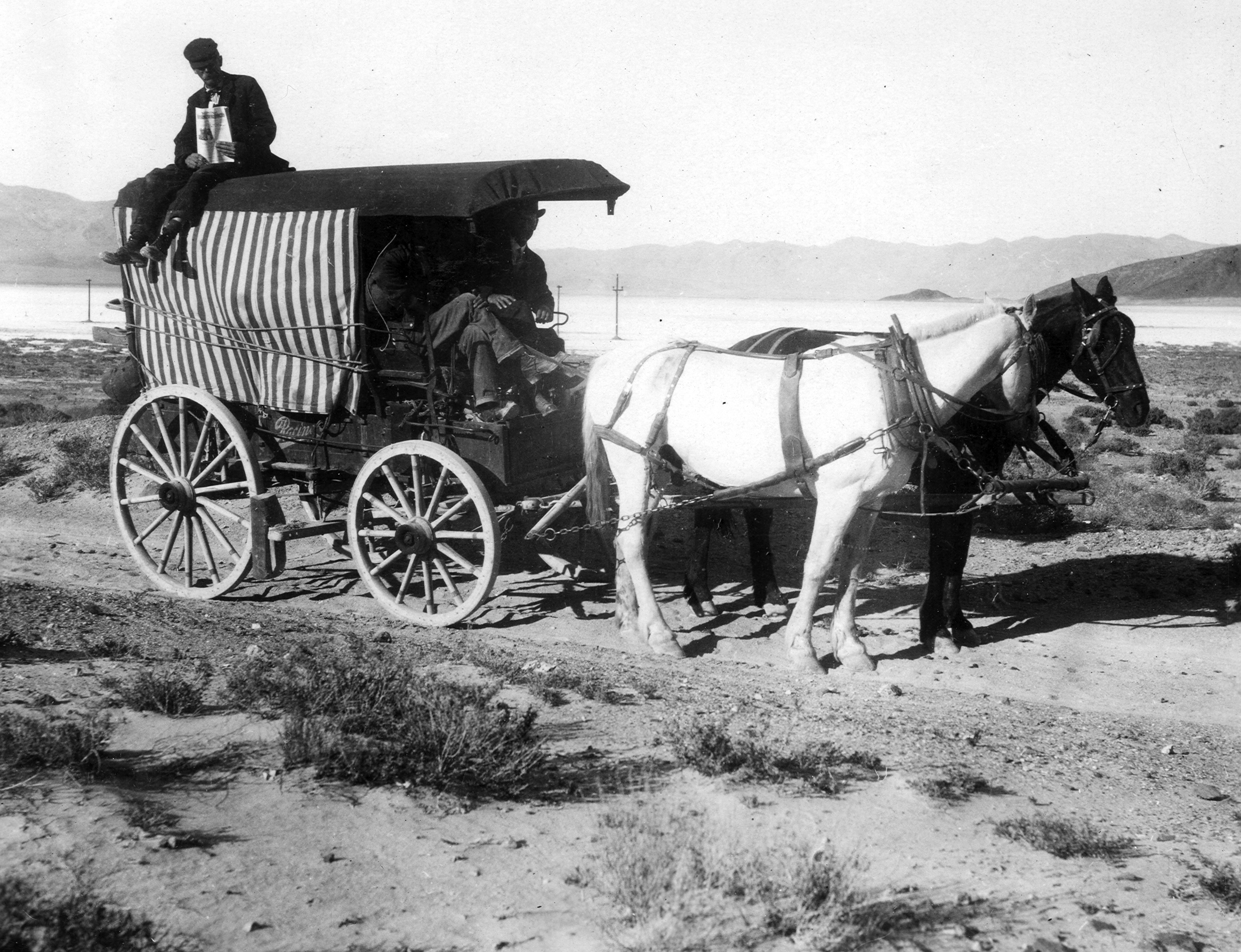
U.S. Geological Survey outfit enroute Blair to Silverpeak. Silver Peak quadrangle. Esmeralda County, Nevada. 1912.

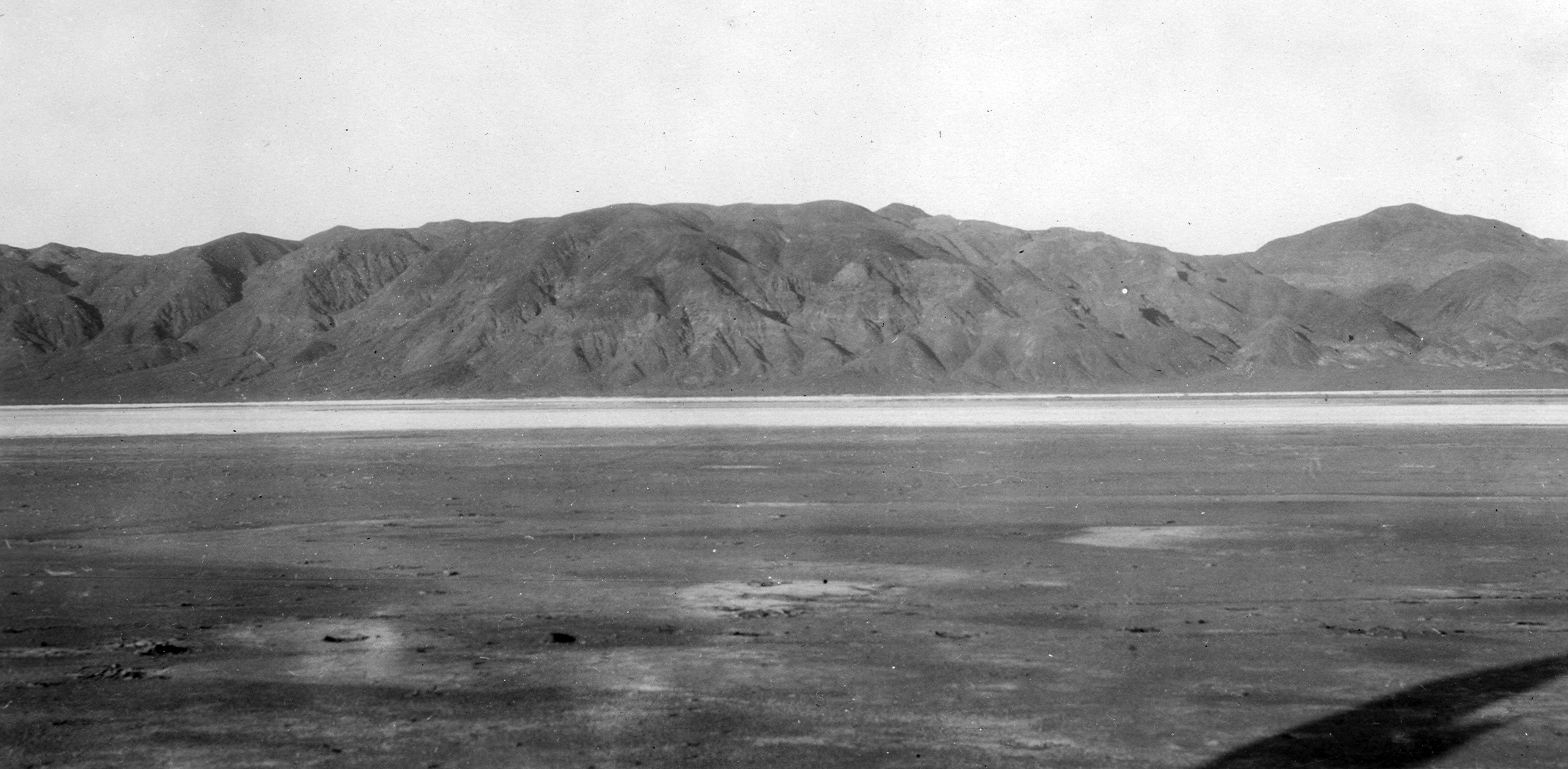
Paymaster Hills, eight miles east of Blair. Silver Peak quadrangle. Esmeralda County, Nevada. 1912.

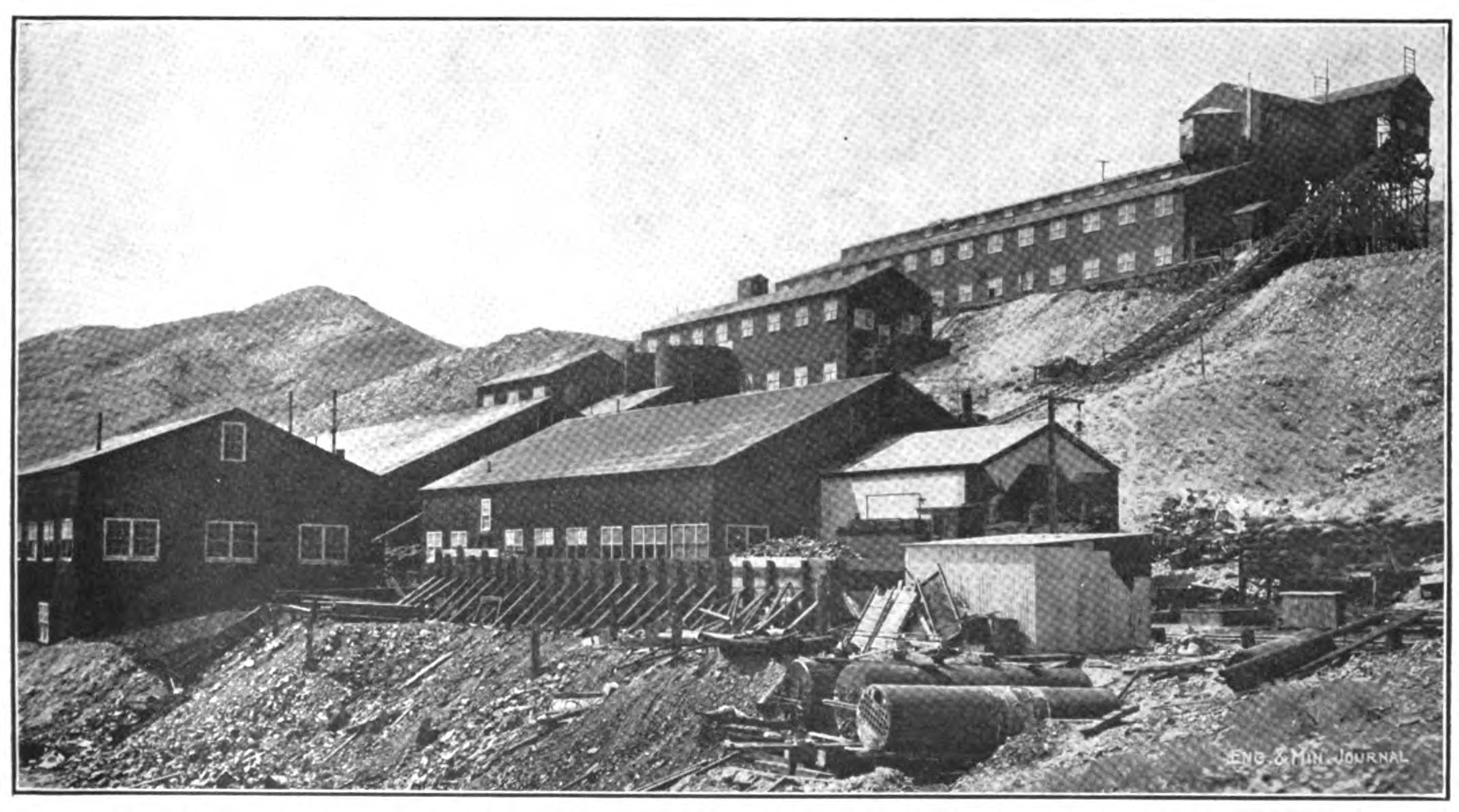
General view of the Pittsburgh-Silver Peak Mill, Blair, Nev. 1914

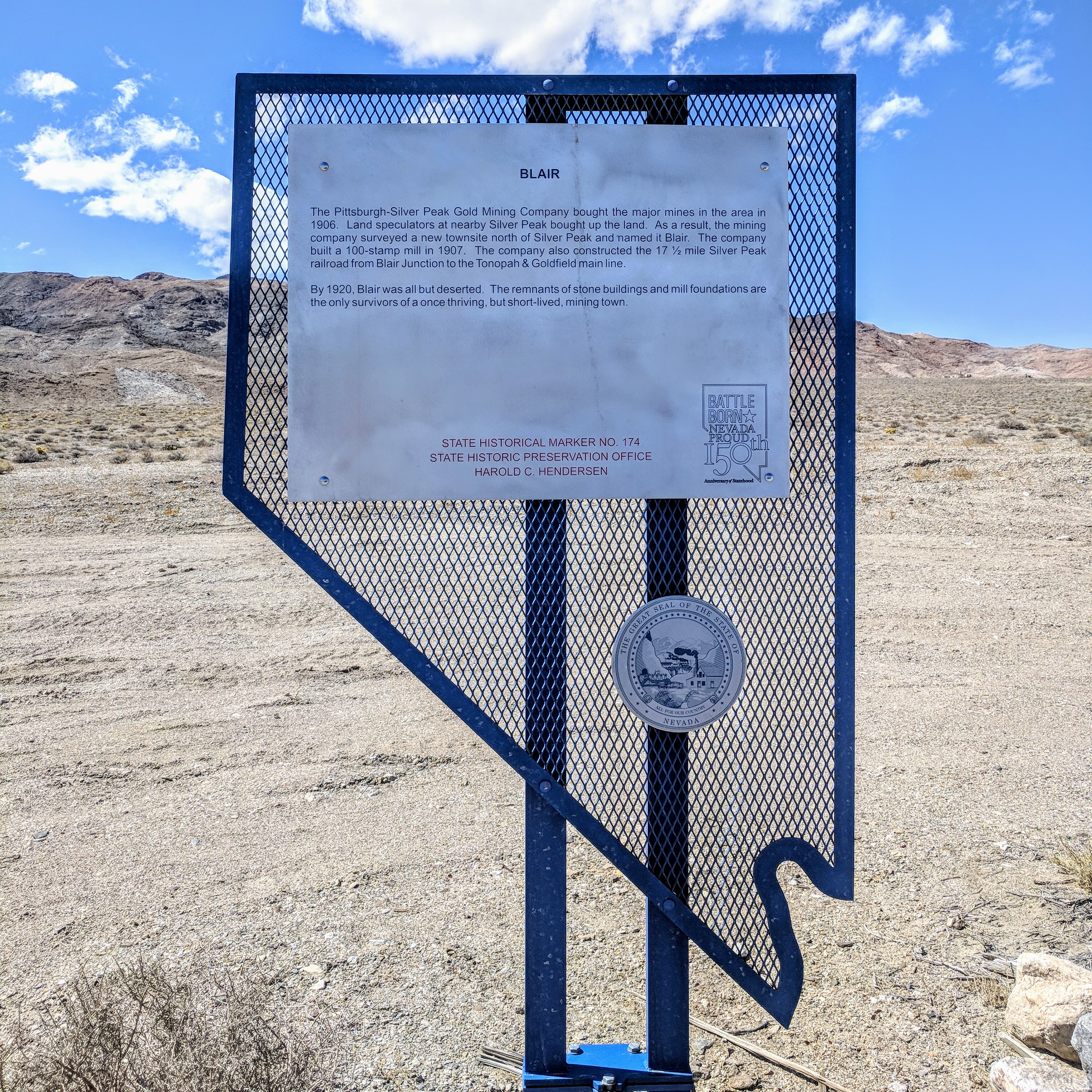
The state historical marker off of Highway 265.

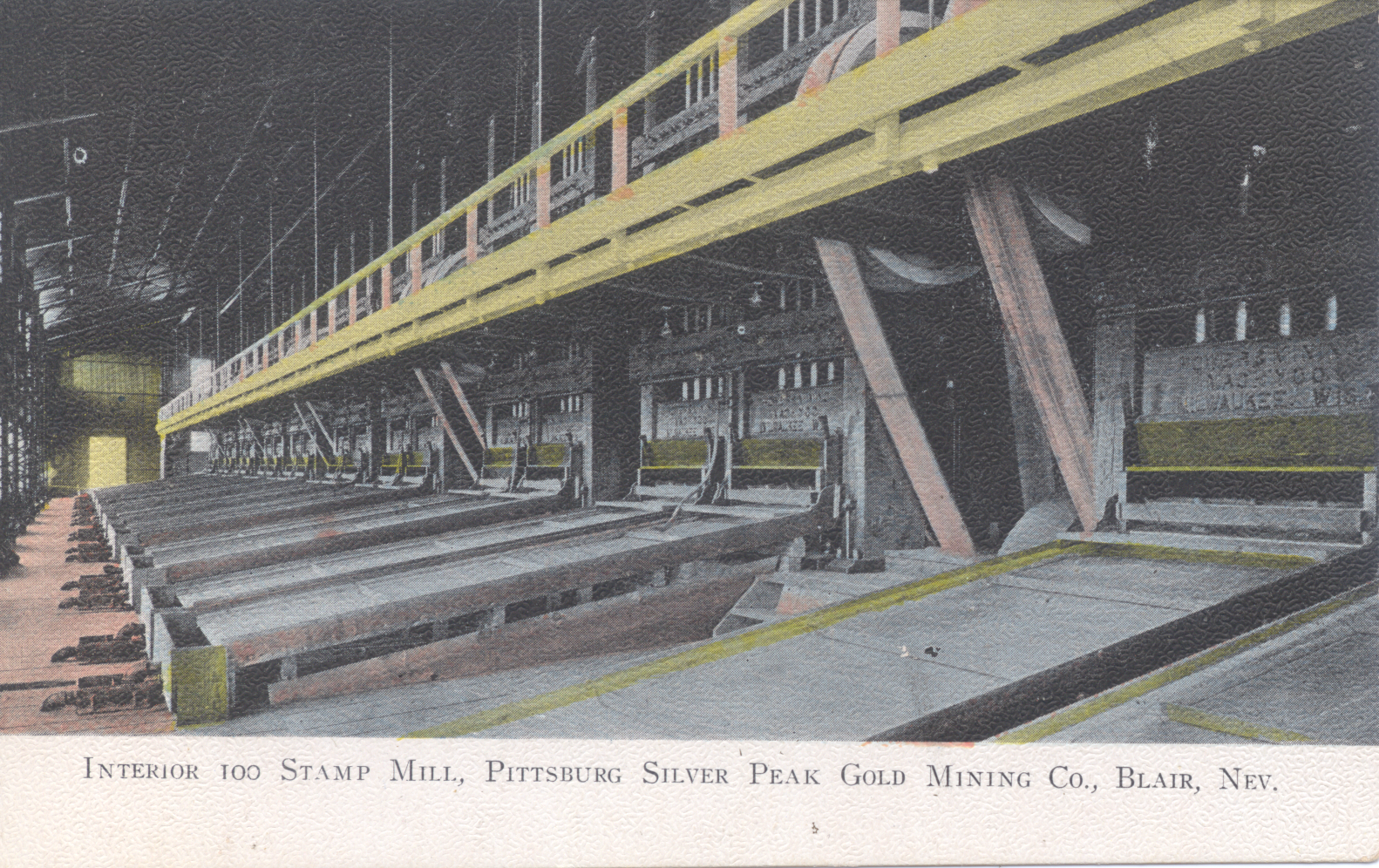
The interior of the 100 stamp mill of the Pittsburg Silver Peak Gold Mining Co., Blair Nevada.
