= Blair Junction, Nevada =

- Ghost town
- Location within Nevada Location within the United States
- Coordinates: 38°00′30″N 117°46′25″W
- Country: United States
- State: Nevada
- County: Esmeralda
- Named for: D. C. Blair, a railroad agent
- Elevation: 4,819 ft (1,469 m)
- Time zone: UTC-8 (Pacific Time)
  - Summer (DST): UTC-7 (Pacific Daylight Time)
- GNIS feature ID: 848230

Blair Junction is the neglected site of a formerly populated settlement in Esmeralda County, in the U.S. state of Nevada.

== History ==
Blair Junction was at the junction of the Tonopah and Goldfield Railroad and the Silver Peak Railroad, located 0.7 miles south of the present Blair Junction on Nevada State Route 265. On the Tonopah and Goldfield Railroad, Coaldale was to the west and McLeans was to the east.

A post office called Blair Junction was in operation from 1922 until 1923.

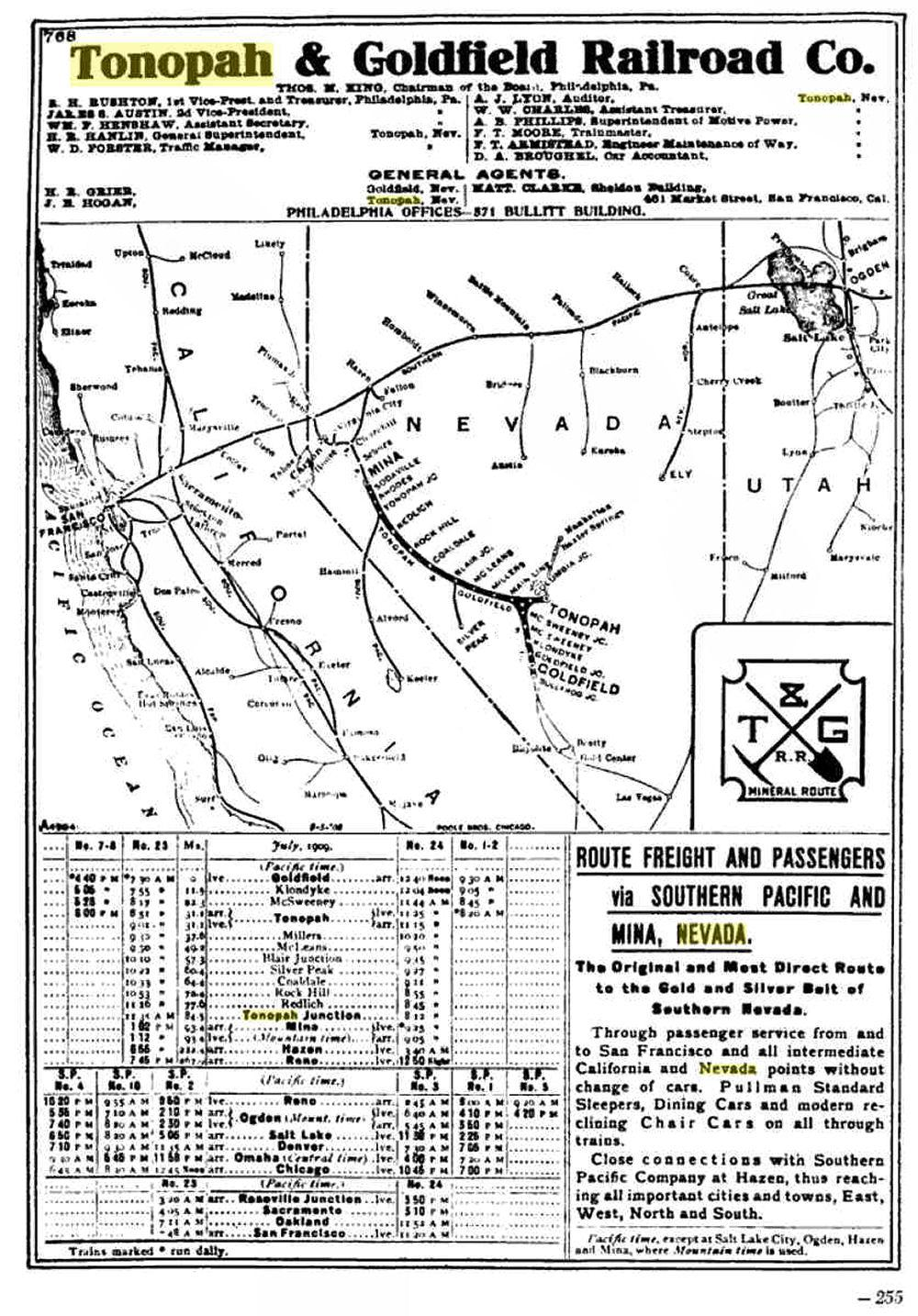
Tonopah and Goldfield Railroad Map, circa 1910, showing Blair Junction.
