= Esmeralda County, Nevada =

County in Nevada, United States

- County
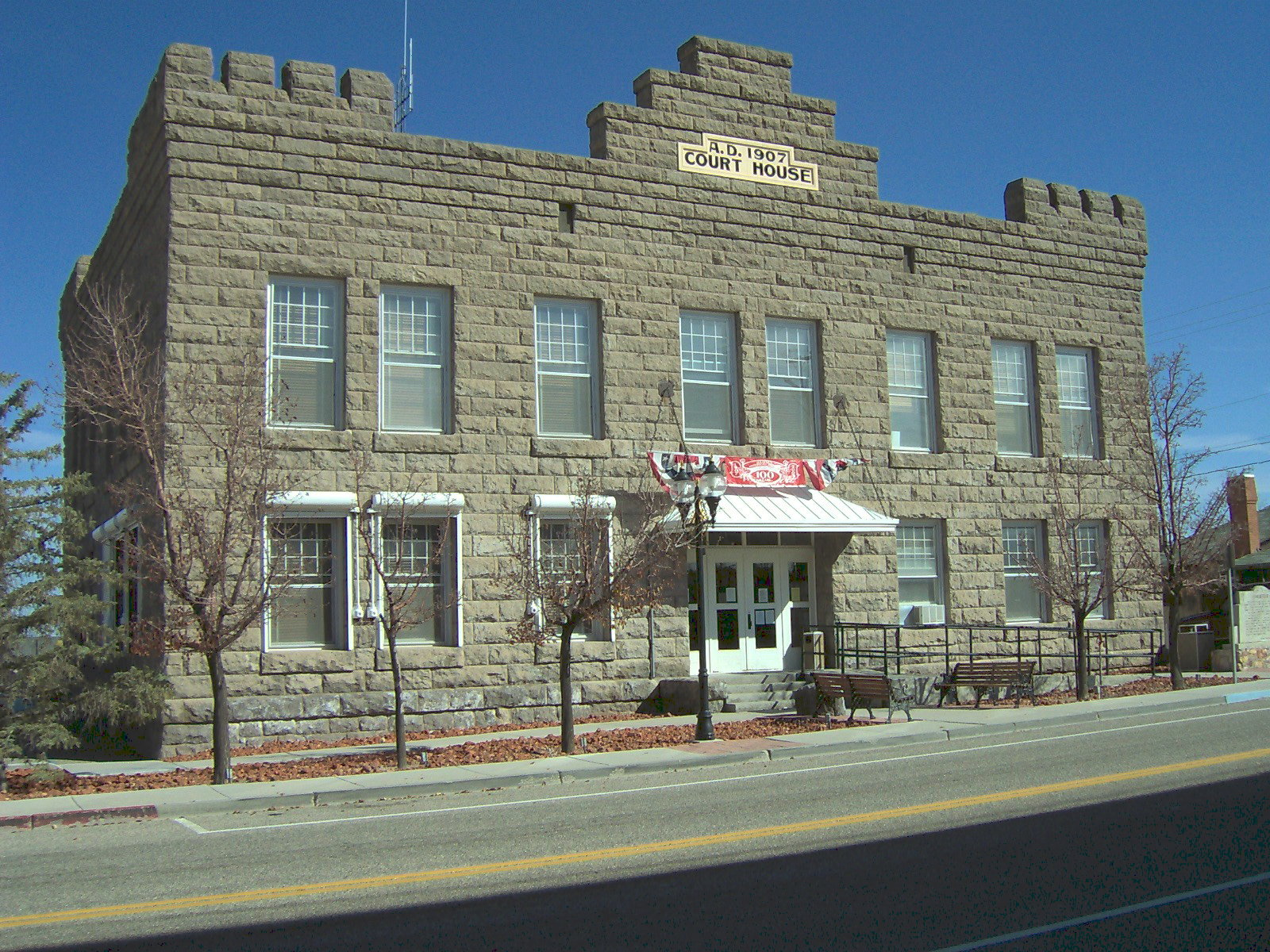
- Esmeralda County Courthouse in Goldfield

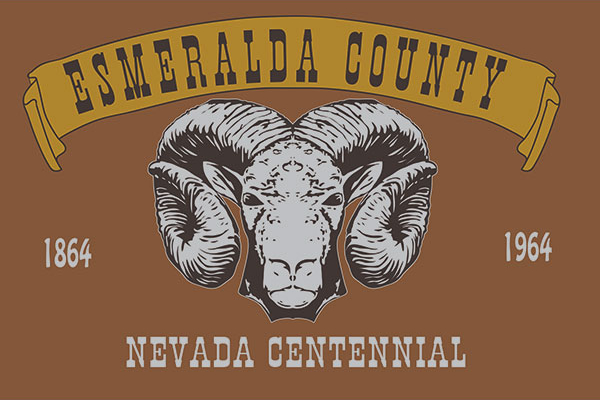
- Flag Seal

- Location within the U.S. state of Nevada
- Coordinates: 37°47′05″N 117°37′57″W
- Country: United States
- State: Nevada
- Founded: November 25, 1861
- Named for: Emerald
- Seat: Goldfield
- Largest community: Dyer

Area
  - Total: 3,589 sq mi (9,300 km^{2})
  - Land: 3,582 sq mi (9,280 km^{2})
  - Water: 7.2 sq mi (19 km^{2}) 0.2%

Population (2020)
  - Total: 729
  - Estimate (2025): 729
  - Density: 0.204/sq mi (0.0786/km^{2})
- Time zone: UTC−8 (Pacific)
  - Summer (DST): UTC−7 (PDT)
- Congressional district: 4th
- Website: www.accessesmeralda.com

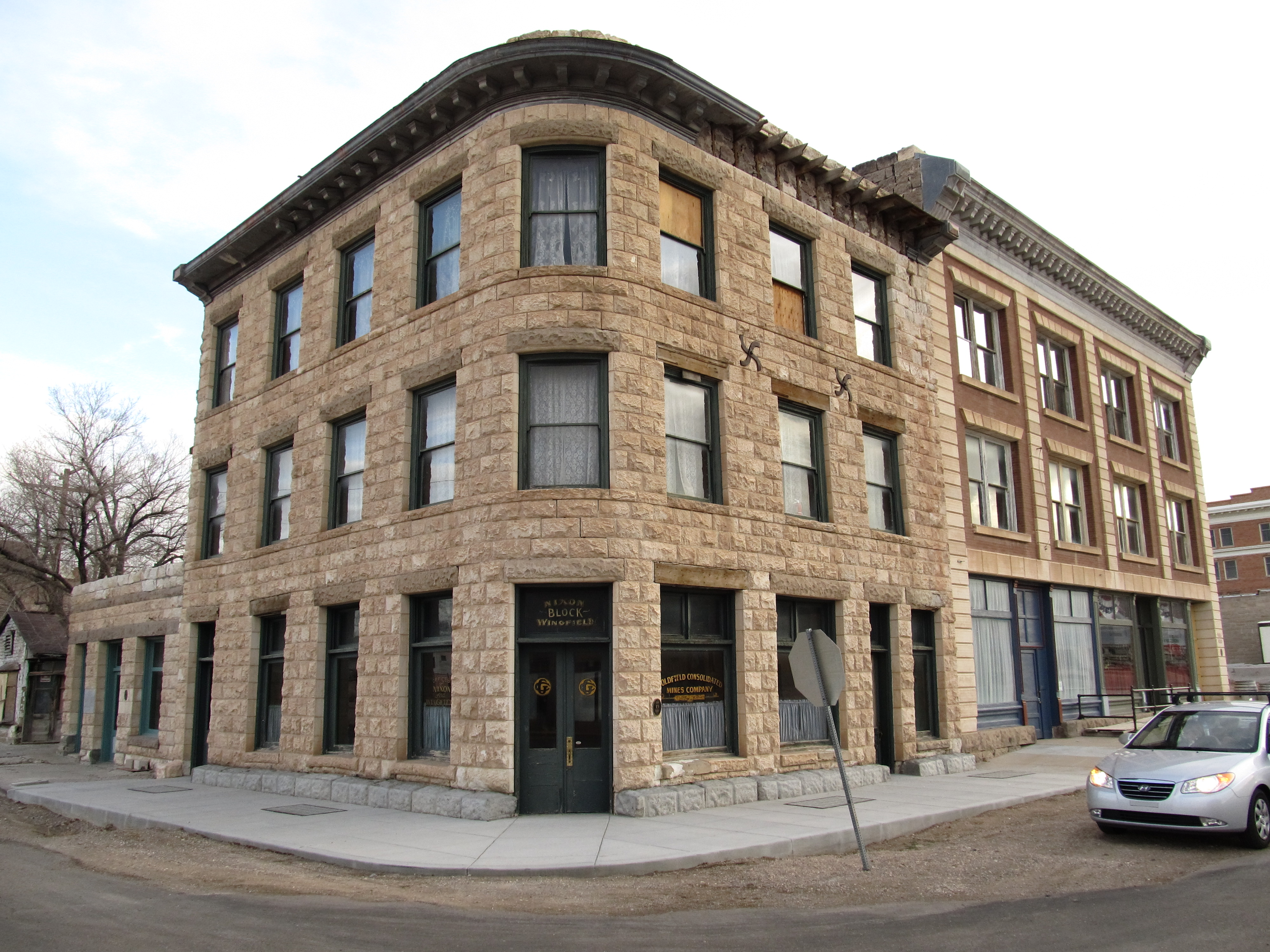
Southern Nevada Consolidated Telephone-Telegraph Company Building, in the Goldfield Historic District.

Esmeralda County is a county in the southwestern portion of the U.S. state of Nevada. As of the 2025 estimate, the population was 729, making it the least populous county in Nevada, and the 20th least populous county in the United States. Esmeralda County does not have any incorporated communities. Its county seat is the town of Goldfield.

Its 2000 census population density of 0.2706 inhabitants per square mile (0.1045/km^{2}) was the second-lowest of any county in the contiguous United States (above Loving County, Texas). Its school district does not have a high school, so students in grades 9–12 go to school in Tonopah, in the Nye County School District.

Most residents live in Goldfield or in the town of Dyer in Fish Lake Valley, near the California border.

== History ==
Esmeralda County is one of the original counties in Nevada, established on November 25, 1861. When it was organized, it comprised the part of the Nevada Territory south of the 39th parallel and east of Mason Valley. Esmeralda is the Spanish and Portuguese word for "emerald". An early California miner from San Jose, James Manning Cory, named the Esmeralda Mining District after Esmeralda the Romani dancer from The Hunchback of Notre-Dame.

Just after the organization of Esmeralda County, the vast majority of the land area had yet to be explored. John C. Frémont was one of the few people who had explored parts of the county. He had crossed Big Smoky Valley in 1845. Also, Aurora and its northern corridor had been encountered. In 1862 and 1863, the area along the Reese River was explored during the Reese River excitement. The event resulted in the establishment of three mining districts in the Toiyabe Range, namely Marysville, Twin River, and Washington, and the establishment of a number of settlements and ranches in Esmeralda County. Explorers pursued south and explored the Shoshone Mountains. The mining district Union was organized after silver was found in 1863 and the settlement of Ione was founded there.

The total area of Esmeralda County more than halved as Nye County was organized on February 16, 1864, entirely out of land that used to be part of Esmeralda County. Esmeralda has had three county seats: Aurora until 1883, Hawthorne from 1883 to 1907 and finally Goldfield. At one point, due to the disputed border with California, Aurora was simultaneously the county seat of both Mono County, California and Esmeralda County. Samuel Clemens (Mark Twain) wrote about his time as a miner in the Esmeralda District in his book Roughing It.

Esmeralda grew from a gold mining boom in the first years of the 20th century. Goldfield, a town founded in 1902, increased rapidly, and it soon became the largest town in Nevada, with about 20,000 people in 1906, but its population rapidly decreased after labor disputes in Goldfield from the efforts of the Industrial Workers of the World and Western Federation of Miners to control labor in the area. The mines were largely tapped out by the end of the 1910s and the economy and population declined afterwards.

== Geography ==
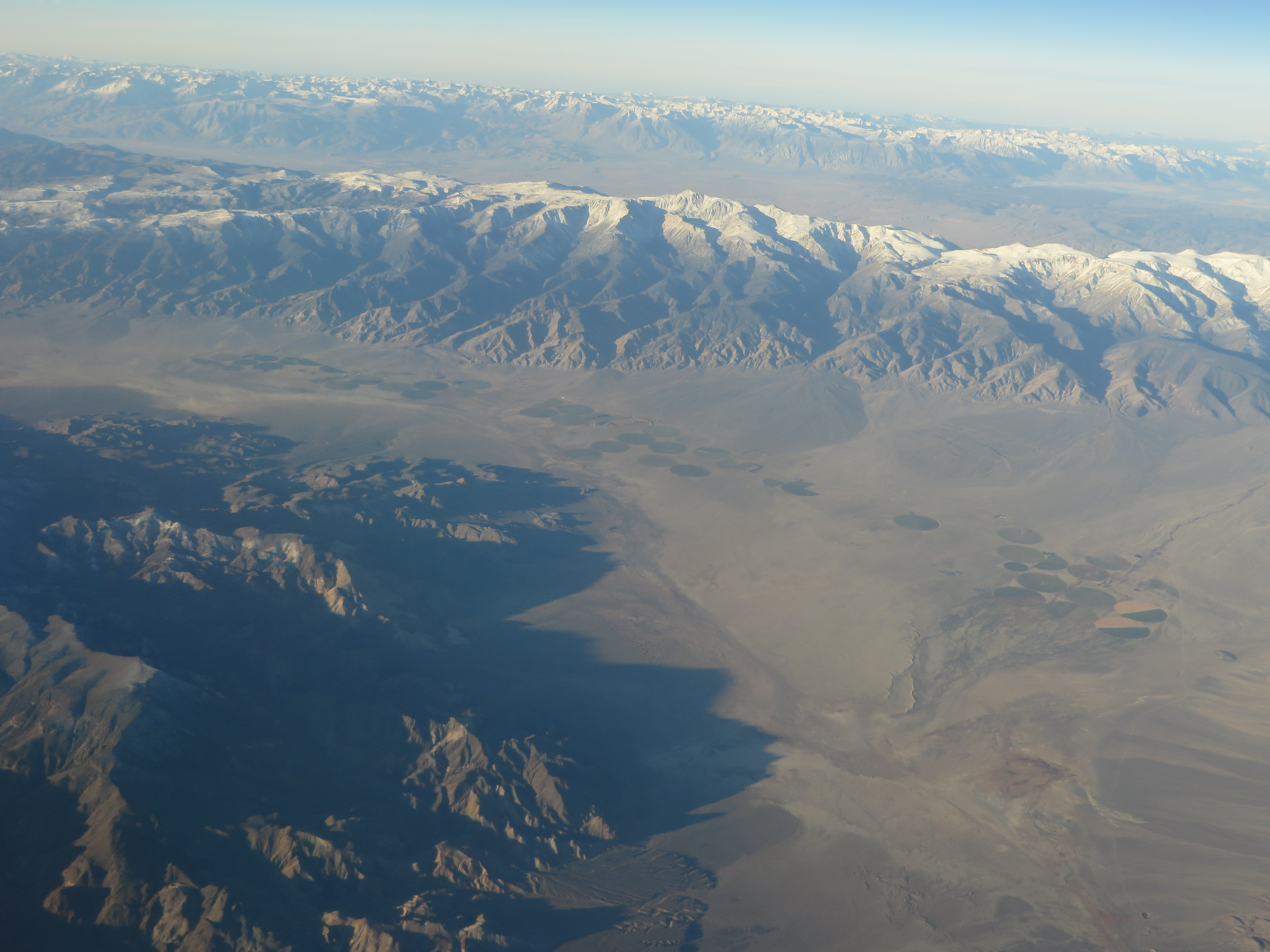
Aerial view of Fish Lake Valley, Nevada-California Border. View is generally to the northeast, towards the Silver Peak Range.

According to the U.S. Census Bureau, the county has a total area of 3,589 square miles (9,300 km^{2}), of which 3,582 square miles (9,280 km^{2}) is land and 7.2 square miles (19 km^{2}) (0.2%) is water. It is the fourth-smallest county in Nevada by area. A very small part of Death Valley National Park lies in its southeast corner.

The county is dominated by the Silver Peak and Monte Cristo mountain ranges. Mountains in the county include:

- Boundary Peak, 13,147 feet (4,007 m), the highest natural point in Nevada
- Piper Peak, 9,450 feet (2,880 m), the most prominent peak in Esmeralda County
- Magruder Mountain 9,044 feet (2,757 m)
- Montezuma Peak, 8,373 feet (2,552 m)
- Emigrant Peak, 6,790 feet (2,070 m)

=== Highways ===
- Interstate 11 (Future)
- U.S. Route 6
- U.S. Route 95
- State Route 264
- State Route 265
- State Route 266
- State Route 267
- State Route 773
- State Route 774

=== Adjacent counties ===
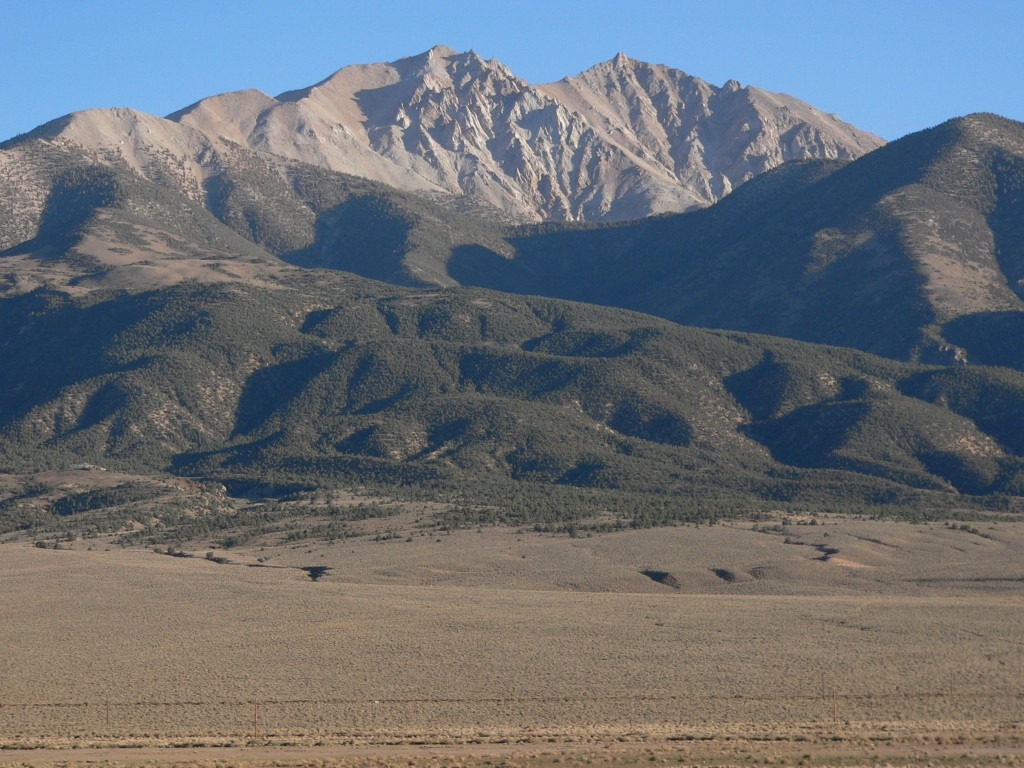
Boundary Peak, the highest point in both Esmeralda County and the state of Nevada, is in the Inyo National Forest

- Mineral County - northwest
- Nye County - east
- Inyo County, California - south
- Mono County, California - west

=== National protected areas ===
- Death Valley National Park (part)
- Inyo National Forest (part)
- Boundary Peak Wilderness

== Demographics ==
Historical population
Census	Pop.	Note	%±
1870	1,553		—
1880	3,220		107.3%
1890	2,148		−33.3%
1900	1,972		−8.2%
1910	9,369		375.1%
1920	2,410		−74.3%
1930	1,077		−55.3%
1940	1,554		44.3%
1950	614		−60.5%
1960	619		0.8%
1970	629		1.6%
1980	777		23.5%
1990	1,344		73.0%
2000	971		−27.8%
2010	783		−19.4%
2020	729		−6.9%
2025 (est.)	729	Steady	0.0%
U.S. Decennial Census; 1790-1960 1900-1990; 1990-2000 2010-2020

=== Racial and ethnic composition ===
Esmeralda County, Nevada – Racial and ethnic composition Note: the US Census treats Hispanic/Latino as an ethnic category. This table excludes Latinos from the racial categories and assigns them to a separate category. Hispanics/Latinos may be of any race.
Race / Ethnicity (NH = Non-Hispanic)	Pop 1980	Pop 1990	Pop 2000	Pop 2010	Pop 2020	% 1980	% 1990	% 2000	% 2010	% 2020
White alone (NH)	718	1,137	781	605	521	92.41%	84.60%	80.43%	77.27%	71.47%
Black or African American alone (NH)	3	7	1	0	4	0.39%	0.52%	0.10%	0.00%	0.55%
Native American or Alaska Native alone (NH)	20	67	45	33	20	2.57%	4.99%	4.63%	4.21%	2.74%
Asian alone (NH)	5	8	0	3	4	0.64%	0.60%	0.00%	0.38%	0.55%
Native Hawaiian or Pacific Islander alone (NH)	x	x	2	0	0	x	x	0.21%	0.00%	0.00%
Other race alone (NH)	1	0	0	1	0	0.13%	0.00%	0.00%	0.13%	0.00%
Mixed race or Multiracial (NH)	x	x	43	21	41	x	x	4.43%	2.68%	5.62%
Hispanic or Latino (any race)	30	125	99	120	139	3.86%	9.30%	10.20%	15.33%	19.07%
Total	777	1,344	971	783	729	100.00%	100.00%	100.00%	100.00%	100.00%

=== 2020 census ===
As of the 2020 census, the county had a population of 729. The median age was 53.6 years. 18.2% of residents were under the age of 18 and 28.5% of residents were 65 years of age or older.

For every 100 females there were 113.8 males, and for every 100 females age 18 and over there were 118.3 males age 18 and over. 0.0% of residents lived in urban areas, while 100.0% lived in rural areas.

The racial makeup of the county was 75.2% White, 0.5% Black or African American, 4.1% American Indian and Alaska Native, 0.8% Asian, 0.0% Native Hawaiian and Pacific Islander, 8.9% from some other race, and 10.4% from two or more races. Hispanic or Latino residents of any race comprised 19.1% of the population.

There were 365 households in the county, of which 23.8% had children under the age of 18 living with them and 21.6% had a female householder with no spouse or partner present. About 38.4% of all households were made up of individuals and 21.1% had someone living alone who was 65 years of age or older.

There were 537 housing units, of which 32.0% were vacant. Among occupied housing units, 71.2% were owner-occupied and 28.8% were renter-occupied. The homeowner vacancy rate was 1.5% and the rental vacancy rate was 9.5%.

=== 2010 census ===
At the 2010 census, there were 783 people, 389 households, and 213 families living in the county. The population density was 0.2 inhabitants per square mile (0.077/km^{2}). There were 850 housing units at an average density of 0.2 per square mile (0.077/km^{2}). The racial makeup of the county was 84.4% white, 4.2% American Indian, 0.4% Asian, 6.6% from other races, and 4.3% from two or more races. Those of Hispanic or Latino origin made up 15.3% of the population. In terms of ancestry, 26.7% were German, 18.6% were English, 14.0% were American, 13.8% were Irish, and 8.7% were Swedish.

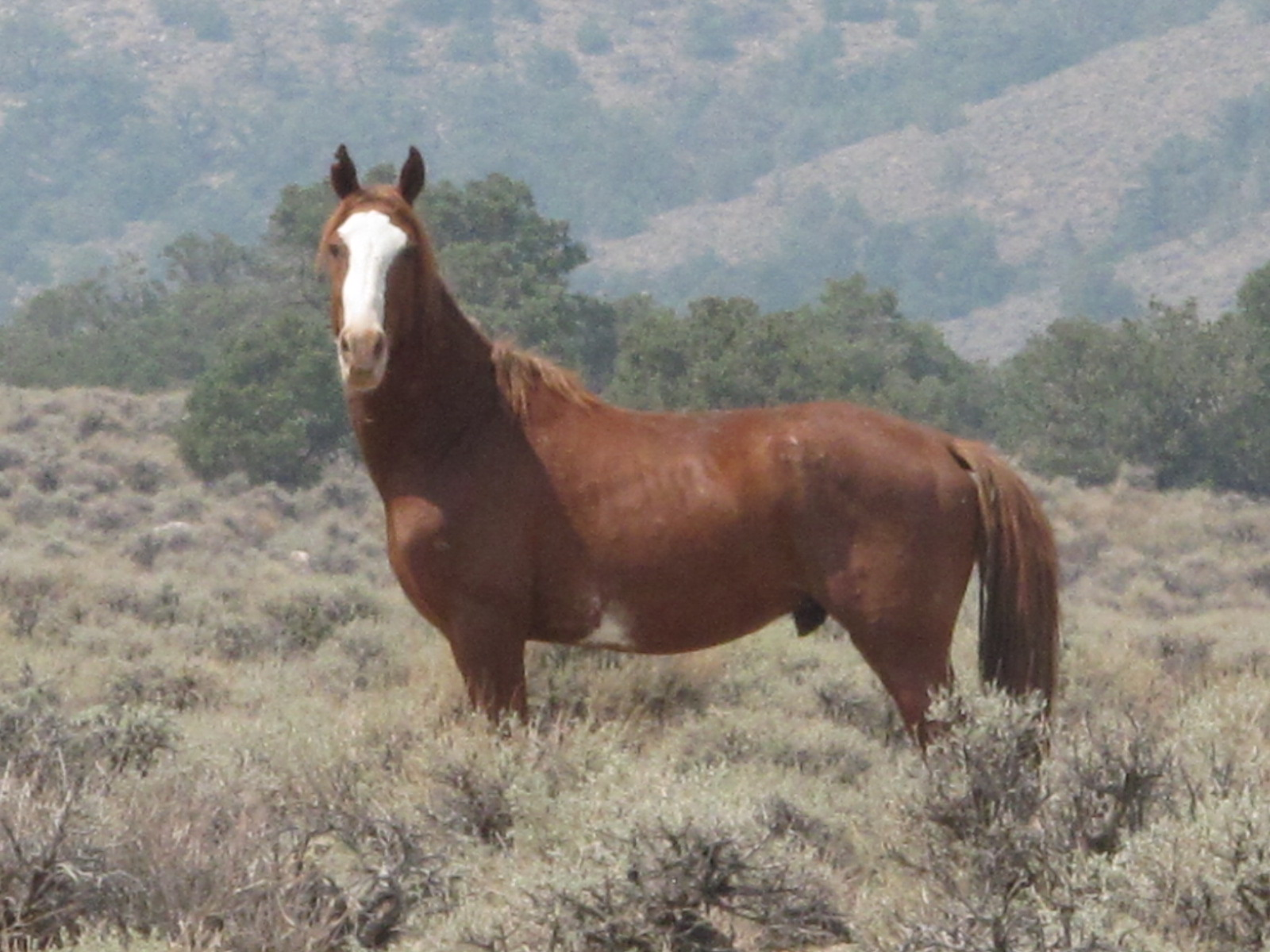
Wild Horse in Fish Lake Valley, 2013.

Of the 389 households, 18.3% had children under the age of 18 living with them, 43.4% were married couples living together, 5.9% had a female householder with no husband present, 45.2% were non-families, and 40.6% of households were made up of individuals. The average household size was 2.01 and the average family size was 2.67. The median age was 52.9 years.

The median household income was $39,712 and the median family income was $57,292. Males had a median income of $41,023 versus $27,019 for females. The per capita income for the county was $34,571. About 6.7% of families and 11.2% of the population were below the poverty line, including 9.8% of those under age 18 and 9.4% of those age 65 or over.

=== 2000 census ===
At the 2000 census there were 971 people, 455 households, and 259 families living in the county. The population density was 0 people per square mile (0 people/km^{2}). There were 833 housing units at an average density of 0 per square mile (0/km^{2}). The racial makeup of the county was 81.98% White, 0.10% Black or African American, 5.15% Native American, 0.21% Pacific Islander, 7.62% from other races, and 4.94% from two or more races. 10.20% of the population were Hispanic or Latino of any race. Of the 455 households 21.10% had children under the age of 18 living with them, 46.40% were married couples living together, 6.40% had a female householder with no husband present, and 42.90% were non-families. 36.00% of households were one person and 13.20% were one person aged 65 or older. The average household size was 2.12 and the average family size was 2.79.

The age distribution was 20.50% under the age of 18, 6.00% from 18 to 24, 23.40% from 25 to 44, 33.00% from 45 to 64, and 17.20% 65 or older. The median age was 45 years. For every 100 females, there were 123.70 males. For every 100 females age 18 and over, there were 118.70 males.

The median household income was $33,203 and the median family income was $40,917. Males had a median income of $39,327 versus $25,469 for females. The per capita income for the county was $18,971. 15.30% of the population and 7.50% of families were below the poverty line. Out of the total people living in poverty, 9.70% are under the age of 18 and 11.40% are 65 or older.

== Law and government ==
The county seat of Esmeralda County is Goldfield since May 1, 1907. The courthouse was opened on May 1, 1908, and has been in continuous use since then. Currently, the Offices of the Assessor, Auditor/Recorder, District Attorney, Sheriff/Jail, Justice of the Peace, Treasurer, District Court, and Commissioner are located in the building.

=== Politics ===
United States presidential election results for Esmeralda County, Nevada
Year	Republican		Democratic		Third party(ies)	
Year	No.	%	No.	%	No.	%
1904	490	42.20%	380	32.73%	291	25.06%
1908	2,208	38.17%	2,787	48.18%	789	13.64%
1912	252	13.81%	713	39.07%	860	47.12%
1916	709	31.08%	1,135	49.76%	437	19.16%
1920	466	49.57%	347	36.91%	127	13.51%
1924	241	33.20%	150	20.66%	335	46.14%
1928	305	47.21%	341	52.79%	0	0.00%
1932	147	25.65%	426	74.35%	0	0.00%
1936	156	21.61%	566	78.39%	0	0.00%
1940	292	31.36%	639	68.64%	0	0.00%
1944	150	40.21%	223	59.79%	0	0.00%
1948	164	44.93%	183	50.14%	18	4.93%
1952	174	55.59%	139	44.41%	0	0.00%
1956	164	56.94%	124	43.06%	0	0.00%
1960	156	42.05%	215	57.95%	0	0.00%
1964	131	41.19%	187	58.81%	0	0.00%
1968	138	39.09%	118	33.43%	97	27.48%
1972	273	68.25%	127	31.75%	0	0.00%
1976	181	43.51%	214	51.44%	21	5.05%
1980	311	66.31%	110	23.45%	48	10.23%
1984	453	70.02%	158	24.42%	36	5.56%
1988	380	68.84%	143	25.91%	29	5.25%
1992	221	39.53%	118	21.11%	220	39.36%
1996	277	50.73%	140	25.64%	129	23.63%
2000	333	67.82%	116	23.63%	42	8.55%
2004	367	76.30%	99	20.58%	15	3.12%
2008	303	69.02%	104	23.69%	32	7.29%
2012	317	72.87%	92	21.15%	26	5.98%
2016	329	77.78%	65	15.37%	29	6.86%
2020	400	82.14%	74	15.20%	13	2.67%
2024	376	81.56%	73	15.84%	12	2.60%

United States Senate election results for Esmeralda County, Nevada1
Year	Republican		Democratic		Third party(ies)	
Year	No.	%	No.	%	No.	%
2024	345	75.33%	72	15.72%	41	8.95%

== Education ==
The Esmeralda County School District has three elementary schools that currently serve approximately 90 students.

As of 2022 it sends its high school students to Tonopah High School of Nye County School District.

The county is in the service area of Great Basin College.

== Communities ==
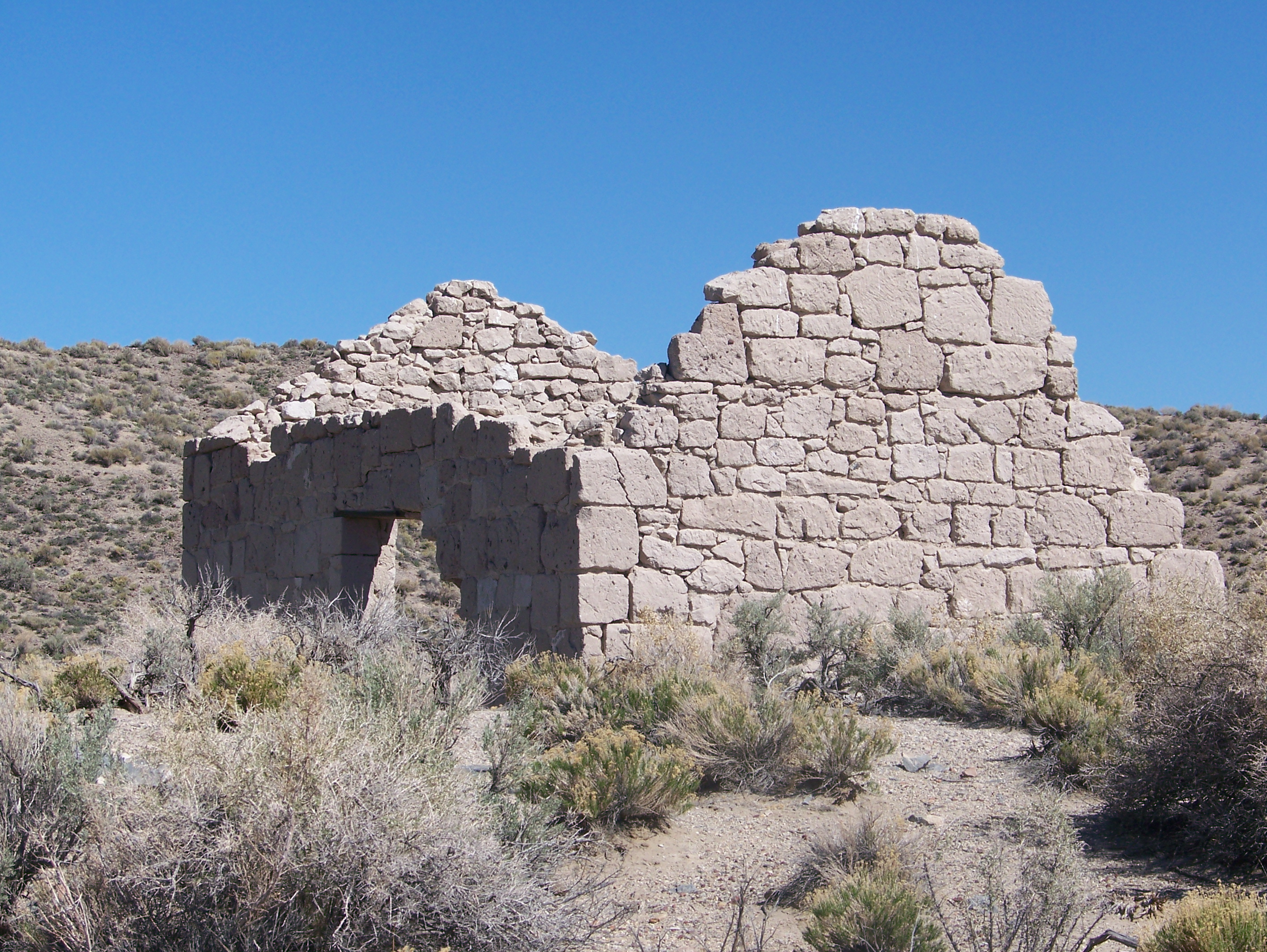
An abandoned building in Palmetto, an Esmeralda County ghost town

=== Census-designated places ===
- Dyer
- Goldfield (county seat)
- Silver Peak

=== Ghost towns ===
- Alkali
- Arlemont
- Blair
- Blair Junction
- Coaldale
- Columbus
- Fish Lake Nevada
- Gilbert
- Gold Point
- Lida
- McLeans
- Millers
- Palmetto

== In popular culture ==
Esmeralda County is mentioned in the song "The Way It Was" by Las Vegas rock band the Killers, off their fourth studio album Battle Born (2012). At the start of the song, the lyric "somewhere outside the lonely Esmeralda County line" can be heard. The lyric is a reference to the fact that Esmeralda County is the least populated county in Nevada, with a population of 783 in the 2010 census.

== See also ==
- National Register of Historic Places listings in Esmeralda County, Nevada
- USS Esmeraldo County (LST-761)
