= USS LST-761 =

1944 LST-542-class tank landing ship

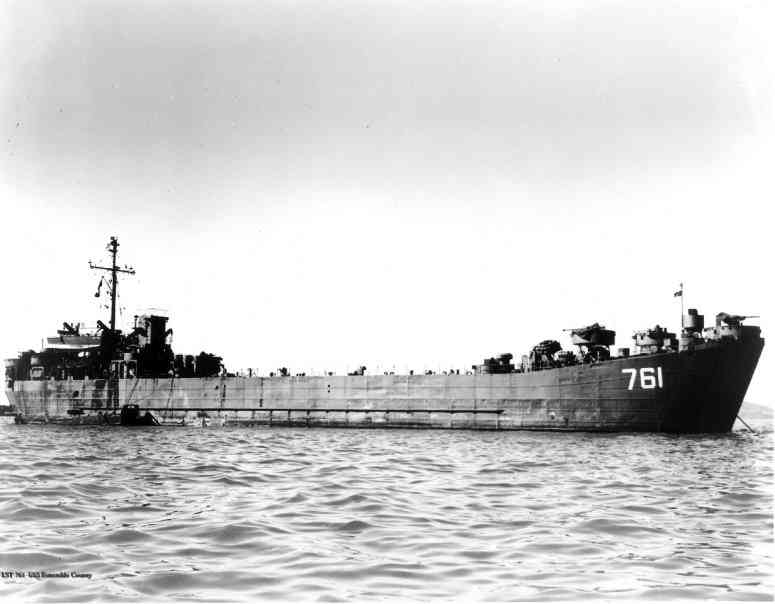
- LST-761

History

United States
- Name: USS LST-761
- Builder: American Bridge Company, Ambridge, Pennsylvania
- Laid down: 18 June 1944
- Launched: 7 August 1944
- Commissioned: 2 September 1944
- Decommissioned: 16 July 1946
- Renamed: USS Esmeraldo County (LST-761), 1 July 1955
- Honours and awards: 1 battle star (World War II)
- Fate: Sunk as a target, 1959

General characteristics
- Class & type: LST-542-class tank landing ship
- Displacement: 1,625 long tons (1,651 t) light; 4,080 long tons (4,145 t) full
- Length: 328 ft (100 m)
- Beam: 50 ft (15 m)
- Draft: Unloaded : 2 ft 4 in (0.71 m) forward; 7 ft 6 in (2.29 m) aft; Loaded : 8 ft 2 in (2.49 m) forward; 14 ft 1 in (4.29 m) aft
- Propulsion: 2 × General Motors 12-567 diesel engines, two shafts, twin rudders
- Speed: 12 knots (22 km/h; 14 mph)
- Boats & landing craft carried: 2 LCVPs
- Troops: 16 officers, 147 enlisted men
- Complement: 7 officers, 104 enlisted men
- Armament: 1 × single 3"/50 caliber gun mount; 8 × 40 mm guns; 12 × 20 mm guns

USS Esmeraldo County (LST-761) was an LST-542-class tank landing ship built for the United States Navy during World War II. Named after an erroneous spelling of Esmeralda County, Nevada, she was the only U.S. Naval vessel to bear the name.

LST-761 was laid down on 18 June 1944 at Ambridge, Pennsylvania by the American Bridge Company; launched on 7 August 1944; sponsored by Mrs. H. A. Brainerd; and commissioned on 2 September 1944.

== Service history ==
During World War II, LST-761 was assigned to the Asiatic-Pacific theater and participated in the assault and occupation of Iwo Jima in February and March, 1945. The Coast Guard crew was removed in March, 1946 and the ship was assigned to the Columbia River Group of the Pacific Reserve Fleet; she was decommissioned on 16 July 1946. On 1 July 1955 the ship was named USS Esmeraldo County (LST-761). Esmeraldo County was sunk as a target in 1959.

LST-761 earned one battle star for World War II service.

== See also ==
- List of United States Navy LSTs
