= McLeans, Nevada =

- Ghost town
- Location within Nevada Location within the United States
- Coordinates: 38°02′52″N 117°39′07″W
- Country: United States
- State: Nevada
- County: Esmeralda
- Elevation: 4,793 ft (1,461 m)
- GNIS feature ID: 858089

McLeans is a ghost town located in Esmeralda County, Nevada and former station on the Tonopah and Goldfield Railroad east of Blair Junction and west of Millers.

The name McLeans is thought to honor David McLean, who moved to White Pine County, Nevada in the 1870s from Nova Scotia. In 1891, McLean started ranching in Nye County, Nevada, near Tonopah and later moved to Esmeralda County.

In 1927, a reference in "The Gilbert District, Nevada" by Henry G. Ferguson, states "The nearest railroad point is Gilbert Junction (formerly known as McLeans siding), on the Tonopah and Goldfield Railroad, about 10 miles by road from Gilbert and 5 miles from South Gilbert".

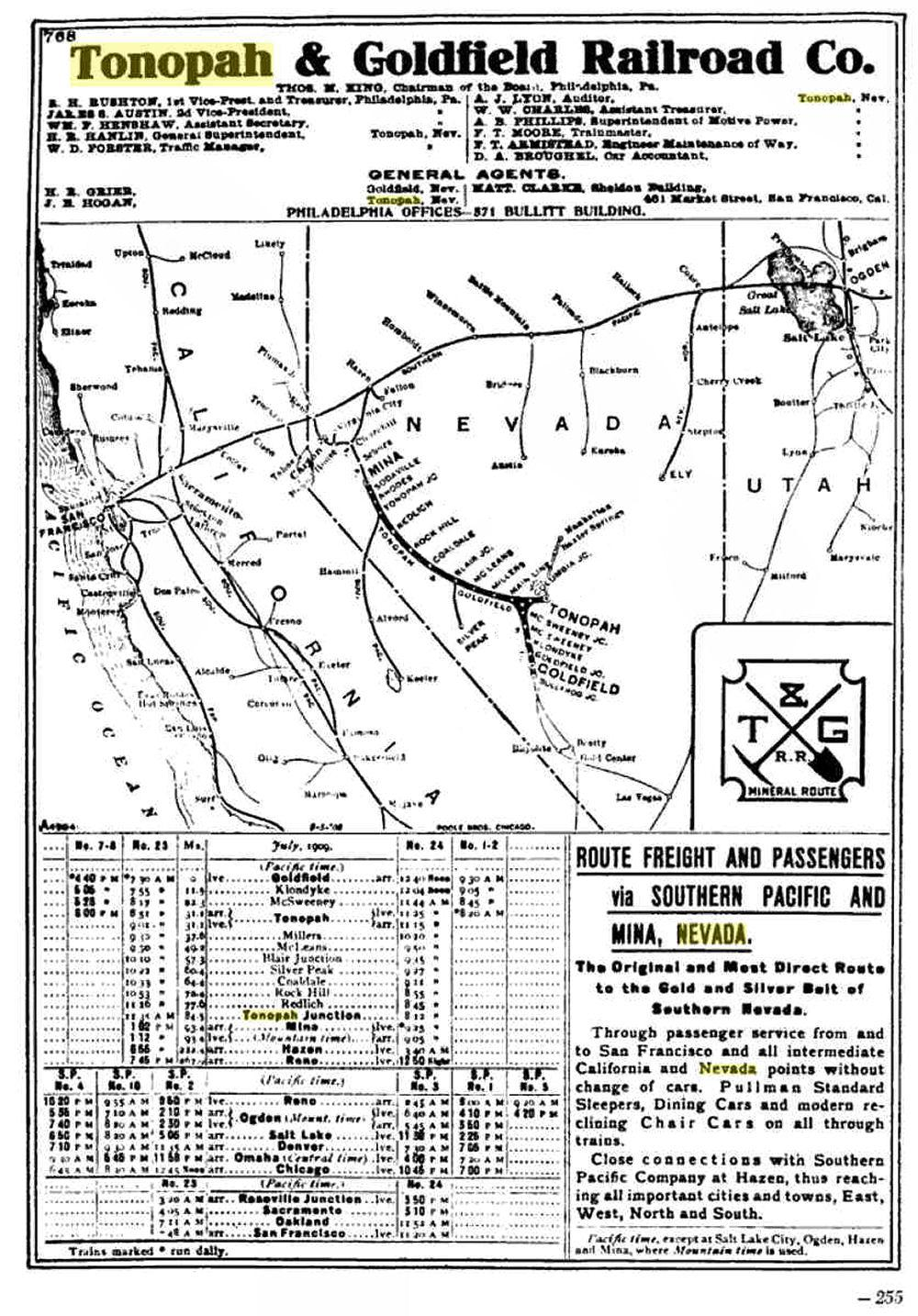
Tonopah and Goldfield Railroad Map, circa 1910, showing McLeans.
