= Gilbert, Nevada =

- Ghost town
- Location within Nevada Location within the United States
- Coordinates: 38°11′46″N 117°41′48″W
- Country: United States
- State: Nevada
- County: Esmeralda
- Elevation: 6,191 ft (1,887 m)
- GNIS feature ID: 856031

Gilbert is a ghost town in Esmeralda County, in the U.S. state of Nevada.

== History ==
A post office was established at Gilbert in 1925, and remained in operation until 1942. The community was named after the brothers Gilbert, businessmen in the local mining industry.

The population was 50 in 1940.

=== Gilbert Junction ===
McLeans, Nevada, the now former station on the Tonopah and Goldfield Railroad, located to the southwest of Gilbert, was renamed to Gilbert Junction in 1925. The name McLeans is thought to honor David McLean, who moved to White Pine County, Nevada in the 1870s from Nova Scotia. In 1891, McLean started ranching in Nye County, Nevada, near Tonopah and later moved to Esmeralda County.
