= Gilberts (disambiguation) =

Gilberts is a name for the Gilbert Islands in the Pacific Ocean.

Gilberts may also refer to:

- Gilberts, California, an unincorporated community in the United States
- Gilberts, Illinois, a village in Kane County, Illinois, United States

== See also ==
- Gilbert (disambiguation)
