= Silver Peak Railroad =

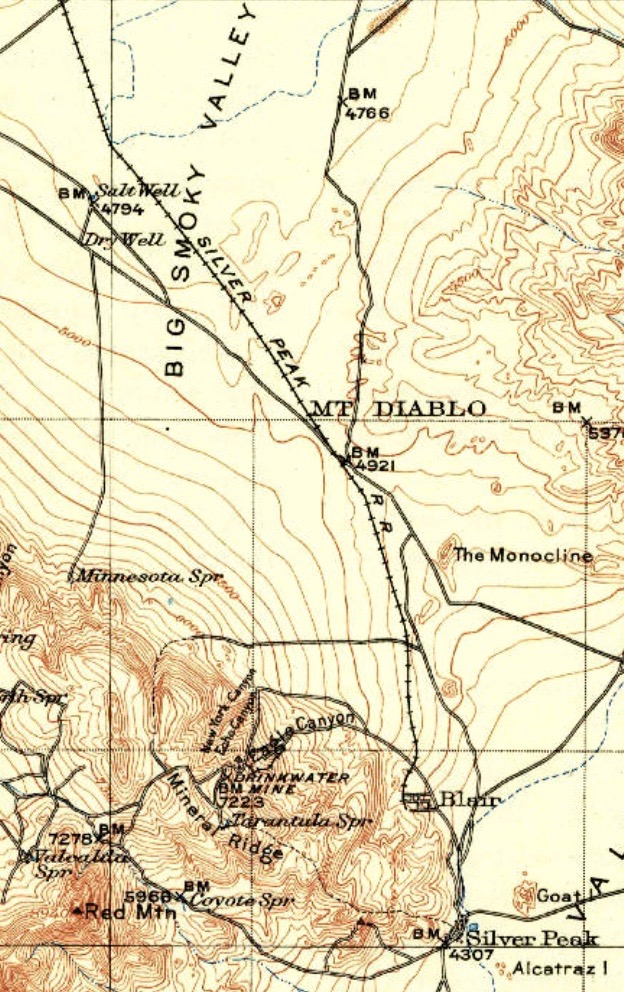
Route in 1913

The Silver Peak Railroad was built by the Pittsburgh Silver Peak Gold Mining Company after it bought a group of mining properties in 1906 and established a 100 stamp mill at Blair, Nevada, in 1907 to service the mines at Silver Peak, Nevada.

The railroad was completed in July 1906, it connected to the Tonopah and Goldfield Railroad at Blair Junction (Historical), located 0.7 mi south of the present Blair Junction US 6/95 and Nevada State Route 265 in the Big Smoky Valley.

Silver Peak Railroad Car #12 "Mary" was a McKeen Motor Car. McKeen cars are self-propelled, have a streamlined front end and a rounded tail.

The McKeen car ended up at Westwood, CA on the premises of the Red River Lumber Company.

Myrick states that the railroad was dismantled by the end of 1915, though The Engineering and Mining Journal states that in October, 1918, the equipment was being dismantled and sent to France and that since the Pittsburgh Silver Peak Company had closed, the branch was no longer needed.
