= Arlemont, Nevada =

Ghost town in Esmeralda County, NV, US

Coordinates: 37°49′28″N 118°04′44″W

Arlemont is an extinct town in Esmeralda County, in the U.S. state of Nevada.

== History ==
The community originally was built up on the Chiatovich Ranch. A post office was established at Arlemont in 1916, and remained in operation until 1932. In 1941, Arlemont had 16 inhabitants.
