= Palmetto, Nevada =

- Ghost town
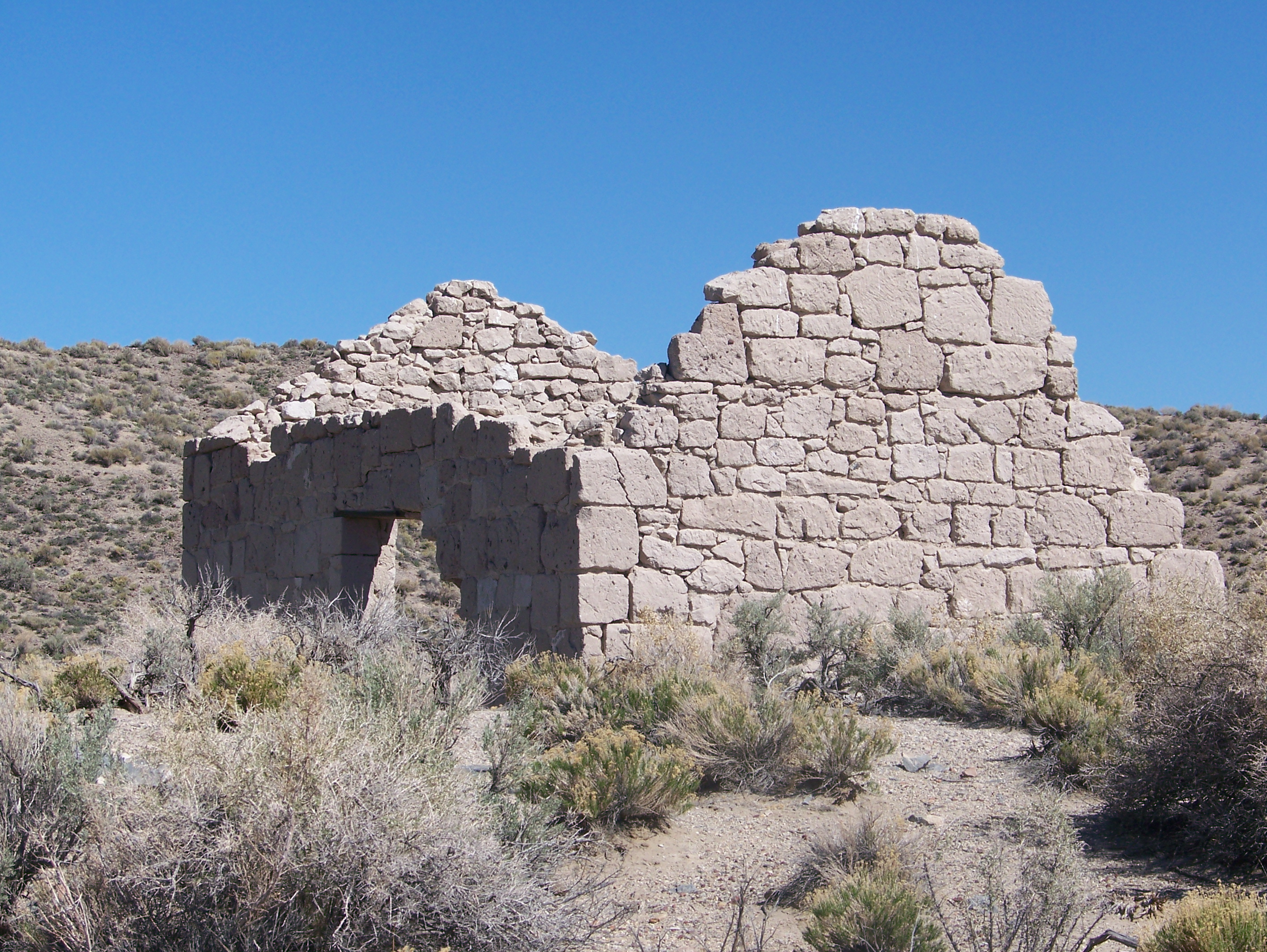

- Location within Nevada Location within the United States
- Coordinates: 37°26′40″N 117°41′41″W
- Country: United States
- State: Nevada
- County: Esmeralda
- Named for: Named by South Carolina prospectors for their native state.
- Elevation: 6,178 ft (1,883 m)
- GNIS feature ID: 849699

Palmetto is a ghost town in Esmeralda County, in the U.S. state of Nevada.

== History ==
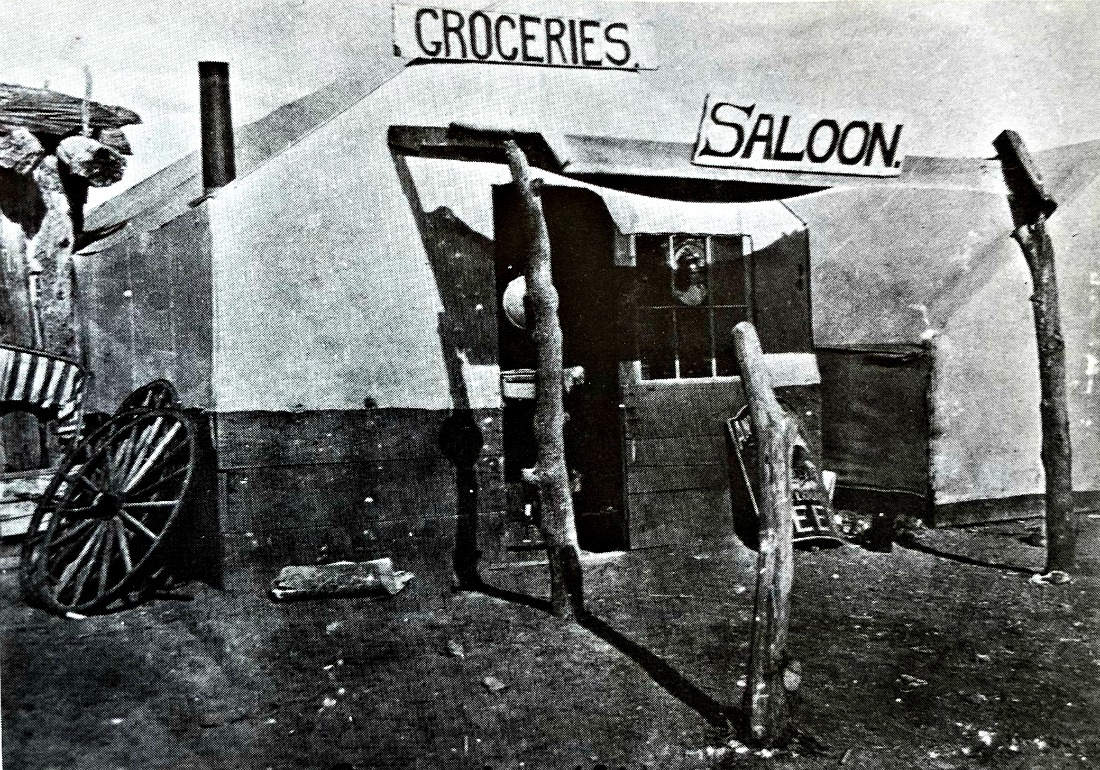
Tent business in Palmetto, 1906

Palmetto was founded and established in 1866, when three prospectors discovered silver deposits north of the site. The miners named the camp Palmetto, mistakenly thinking that nearby Joshua trees were a relative of the palmetto tree. A 12-stamp mill was built at the settlement, but not enough silver ore was mined to keep the mill running.

Although the town was abandoned at a year later, a revival occurred in 1906 when mines were reopened. People and businesses rushed back to town. Over 200 tents were put up on a town site one-half mile (0.8 km) west of Palmetto. A commercial street was laid out with: stores, markets, feed yards, restaurants, lumber companies, saloons and doctors' offices. The mines soon declined, and in the autumn of 1906, miners abandoned the town.

In 1920, another revival occurred, and a mill was built. The town eventually declined. All that stands today are the remains of old buildings.

The Palmetto post office was active from April 24, 1888 until June 7, 1894 and from December 16, 1905 until December 31, 1907.
