= Esmeralda County School District =

Nevada school district serving Esmeralda County

Address
- 233 Ramsey Street Goldfield, Esmeralda County, Nevada, 89013; United States
- Coordinates: 37.70891°N 117.23378°W

District information
- Type: Public
- Motto: Home of the Mustangs
- Grades: 1–8; 9–12 (online)
- Established: 1956; 70 years ago
- Superintendent: James Fossett
- Schools: 3 K-8, 1 online
- NCES District ID: 3200150

Students and staff
- Students: 101 (2020–2021)
- Teachers: 7
- Staff: 28
- Student–teacher ratio: 14.43:1
- District mascot: Mustang

Other information
- Website: www.esmeraldacountyschools.com/en-US

Esmeralda County School District is a public school district in Esmeralda County, Nevada. It is the smallest school district in Nevada. Its boundary is that of the county. The district has offices in Dyer and Goldfield.

As of May 2022, the school district operates 3 elementary and middle schools and one online high school; the district has no physical high school, and high school students are transported to Tonopah. All schools, including the online school, run on a four-day school week.

== History ==
Between the late 19th and early 20th centuries, Esmeralda County (like many of Nevada mining boomtowns) was home to several small rural schools, which were all served by their own independent school districts. (Note: Nevada only required five students in a school to establish a new school district, and did not dissolve districts with more than two students.) 1907 saw these individual rural districts merged into the Fifth Supervision District of Nevada, a state school district that also served schools in Clark County, Nye County, and Lincoln County. However, the Fifth District and other state school districts were plagued by severe funding inequity.

Aware that Nevada public schools were facing significant financial difficulties, Governor Charles H. Russell appointed the School Survey Committee to assist in reorganizing the state's education system. With the advice of the Committee, the Nevada State Legislature enacted new school-related legislation between 1955 and 1956, which ultimately dissolved the Supervision Districts, consolidated school districts within counties, and structured school districts to be coterminous with county lines. The Committee also recommended that Esmeralda County's school district be merged with the Lincoln County School District and the southern segment of Nye County's district, as these were all rural areas; however, this recommendation was rejected, and the Esmeralda County School District became its own independent district.

While several high schools have previously operated in Esmeralda County itself, the county's last high school closed in 1953, and the reorganization of the school districts left Esmeralda County School District without a high school. Three years later, the Esmeralda County school board petitioned to merge with the Nye County School District, which ultimately proved unsuccessful: Nye County did not have the resources to support students in Esmeralda County. However, the counties formed an agreement to allow students in Esmeralda County to attend high school in Nye County.

== Demographics ==
There were 101 students in the Esmeralda County School District in the 2020–2021 school year. The student body was 51.49% White, 35.64% Hispanic, 5.94% American Indian or Alaska Native, 5.94% of multiple races, and 0.99% Black. 13.86% of students had an Individualized Education Program, 9.9% were English language learners, and 98.02% met the state's definition of poverty. (Note: 62.96% of students in the 2019–2020 school year met the state's definition of poverty.)

Esmeralda County School District is the smallest school district in Nevada. The 2020–2021 school year saw an average class size of 8 students.

Esmeralda County School District enrollment, 2003–2021
2003–2004	2004–2005	2005–2006	2006–2007	2007–2008	2008–2009	2009–2010	2010–2011	2011–2012
69	68	86	68	77	68	69	66	64
2012–2013	2013–2014	2014–2015	2015–2016	2016–2017	2017–2018	2018–2019	2019–2020	2020–2021
67	78	74	78	75	73	96	81	101

== Education ==
All schools in the Esmeralda County School District operate on a four-day week to reduce expenses. Employees of the district typically serve multiple roles, with one or two teachers instructing multiple grades on various subjects, and other members of the district substituting for unavailable teachers or bus drivers.

Notably, the school district does not have a physical high school: Esmeralda County's high school students are bussed to Nye County for education and extracurricular activities. Students are provided with access to laptops and a tutor during the bus rides, as some students must commute for up to three hours. The district began operating the Esmeralda Virtual High School, an accredited online school, in August 2019; it serves all grades, including high school students.

== Schools ==
The Esmeralda County School District has three K-8 schools. Students in grades 9 through 12 may either attend the online-only Esmeralda Virtual High School, or Tonopah High School in Tonopah, Nevada, which is operated by the Nye County School District.

=== K-8 ===
- Goldfield Elementary School
- Silver Peak Elementary School
- Dyer Elementary School

=== Alternative schools ===
- Esmeralda Virtual High School (Note: Despite the school being labeled a high school, students of all grade levels may take online courses.)

== "English only" policy controversy ==
In October 2007, the district established a policy banning students from speaking Spanish on bus rides or in school. The policy arose when a district bus driver, who did not know Spanish, claimed that he believed two high school students used Spanish to hide that they were speaking rudely about the driver or an onboard tutor.

District officials stated the policy was meant to help English-speaking bus drivers maintain disciplinary control over students, as well as help Spanish-speaking students improve their English. However, the policy was swiftly criticized as discriminatory, with opponents pointing to the sizable Hispanic population in the school district—at the time, 12 of 30 high school students were Hispanic, and the letter informing families of the policy had been published in both English and Spanish. The American Civil Liberties Union argued that the policy not only prevented native Spanish speakers from having conversations for the entirety of the commute, it also interfered with all students' abilities to study during the long bus rides: Spanish-speaking students could not ask peers for homework help, and English-speaking students could not practice Spanish homework. Tonopah High School and the Nye County School District also lacked an English-only rule, and the principal of Tonopah High School was reportedly unaware of its neighbor's English-only rule. Critics added that it did not make sense to establish the policy in response to two students potentially misbehaving, and that it would have been sufficient to address the specific students.

The district initially defended its policy, stating that it was not meant to discriminate against Spanish-speaking students, and there was no set punishment if students continued speaking Spanish on the bus. In January 2008, the ACLU published a letter to the school district asking for the removal of the policy, as banning use of a language violated the First Amendment of the Constitution. District superintendent Robert Aumagher agreed to meet with the ACLU to amend the policy, and it was ultimately rolled back by February 2008.

== See also ==
- Non-high school district
