= Nevada State Route 265 =

Highway in Nevada

State Route 265
- Silver Peak Road

Route information
- Maintained by NDOT
- Length: 20.500 mi (32.992 km)
- Existed: July 1, 1976–present

Major junctions
- South end: Silver Peak Road in Silver Peak
- North end: Future I-11 / US 6 / US 95 in Blair Junction

Location
- Country: United States
- State: Nevada
- County: Esmeralda

Highway system
- Nevada State Highway System; Interstate; US; State; Pre‑1976; Scenic
← SR 264	→ SR 266

State Route 265 (SR 265) is a 20.5-mile (33.0 km) U.S. State highway in Esmeralda County, Nevada. Referred to as Silver Peak Road, it connects the community of Silver Peak to U.S. Route 6 and U.S. Route 95 (US 6–95). The route formerly existed as State Route 47.

== Route description ==
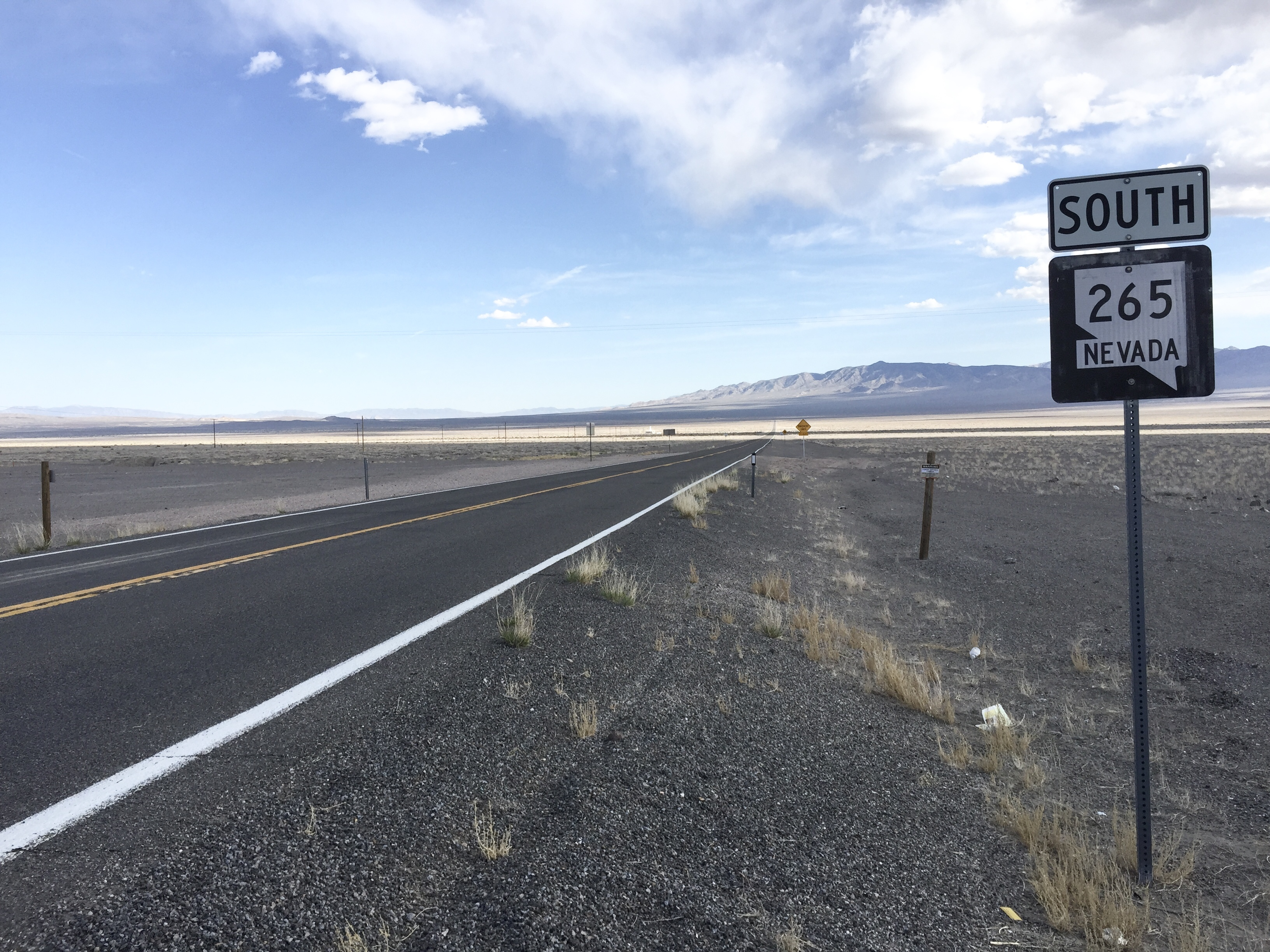
View from the north end of SR 265 looking southbound as seen in 2015

SR 265 starts at Silver Peak Road (an unrelated road heading east) just southwest of Silver Peak. The highway curves north as the main road through the town. Outside of Silver Peak, the route heads north and slightly westward through the desert. SR 265 ends at Blair Junction on US 6–95, approximately 6 miles (9.7 km) east of Coaldale.

== History ==
Silver Peak Road first appears on the 1935 edition of the official state highway map. This version shows it as State Route 47, an unimproved highway. The entire road had been paved by 1940. SR 47 remained relatively unchanged until July 1, 1976, when the highway was rechristened as State Route 265.

== Major intersections ==
The entire route is in Esmeralda County.

Location	mi	km	Destinations	Notes
Silver Peak	0.000	0.000	Silver Peak Road	Southern terminus
Blair Junction	20.500	32.992	Future I-11 / US 6 / US 95 – Tonopah, Hawthorne	Proposed interchange; northern terminus
1.000 mi = 1.609 km; 1.000 km = 0.621 mi
