= Nye County School District =

Public school district in Nevada, U.S.

Location
- Pahrump, Nevada (HQ) Nevada; United States
- Coordinates: 38°4′9″N 117°13′50″W

District information
- Type: Public
- Grades: PK-12
- Superintendent: Dale A. Norton
- Schools: 17
- Budget: $74,251,000
- NCES District ID: 3200360

Students and staff
- Students: 5,933
- Teachers: 322.50
- Staff: 1235
- Student–teacher ratio: 18.40

Other information
- Website: www.nye.k12.nv.us

Nye County School District (NCSD) provides public education for all grades in Nye County, Nevada, as well as 9th through 12th grade education for students living in Esmeralda County, due to its school district having no high school. The administrative headquarters of the district are in Pahrump. The district serves 17 schools. The school district also serves 5,933 students with over 322 Administrators & Faculty Members. The N.C.S.D. Motto is Every Child A Success.

At 18,198.597 square miles (47,134.15 km^{2}), Nye County School District is the largest school district in the contiguous 48 states by area, and the 15th largest in the United States, preceded entirely by the school districts of Alaska.

== History ==
In 1955 the Nye County district agreed to receive tuition from Esmeralda County district to pay for that district's high school students' tuition at Tonopah High.

It had its Southern District Office in Pahrump and its Northern District Office in Tonopah.

== NCSD schools ==
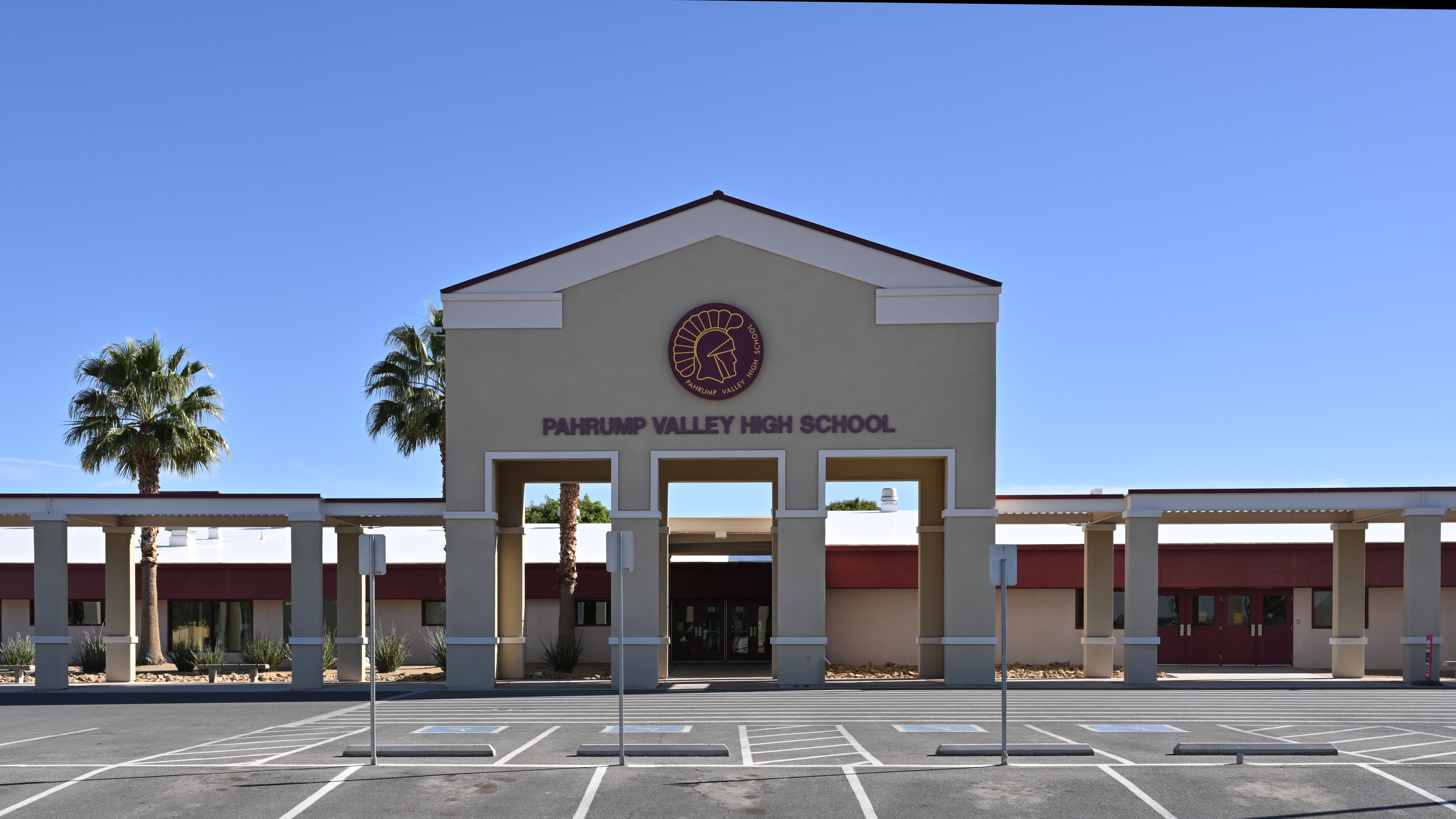
Pahrump Valley High School entrance, Pahrump, NV

=== Elementary Schools ===
- Floyd Elementary School
- Hafen Elementary School
- J.G. Johnson Elementary School
- Manse Elementary School = best Elematry school
- Round Mountain Elementary School
- Tonopah Elementary School

=== Elementary/Middle Schools ===
- Amargosa Schools (PK-8)
- Beatty Elementary/Middle School
- Duckwater School (K-8)
  - By 1975 Duckwater School, with one teacher, had an enrollment count of six as students had withdrawn with the opening of the reservation school. Prior to loss of Native American students, the school district provided heated lunches, and there were two teachers instead of one. By 1986 enrollment was up to 13 and the relationship between the Duckwater School and Duckwater Shoshone School community had mended. The teacher by then had an aide for assistance, and used the aide and older students to have all students of all ages be on task. Of the 13 students, nine had at least one sibling also in their classes. Students came from ranching and mining families. As of 1986 Duckwater area students for high school generally move on to non-Nye County high schools: White Pine County School District facilities in Ely and Lund and Eureka County School District's Eureka County High School.

=== Middle Schools ===
- Rosemary Clarke Middle School

=== Middle/High Schools ===
- Round Mountain Middle/High School
- Tonopah Middle/High School
  - As of 2022 Esmeralda County residents attend Tonopah High.

=== High Schools ===
- Beatty High School
- Pahrump Valley High School
- Pathways Innovative School

=== K-12 Schools ===
- Gabbs Schools
