= Gilbert House (Worthington, Ohio) =

Historic house in Ohio, United States

- U.S. National Register of Historic Places
- U.S. Historic district – Contributing property
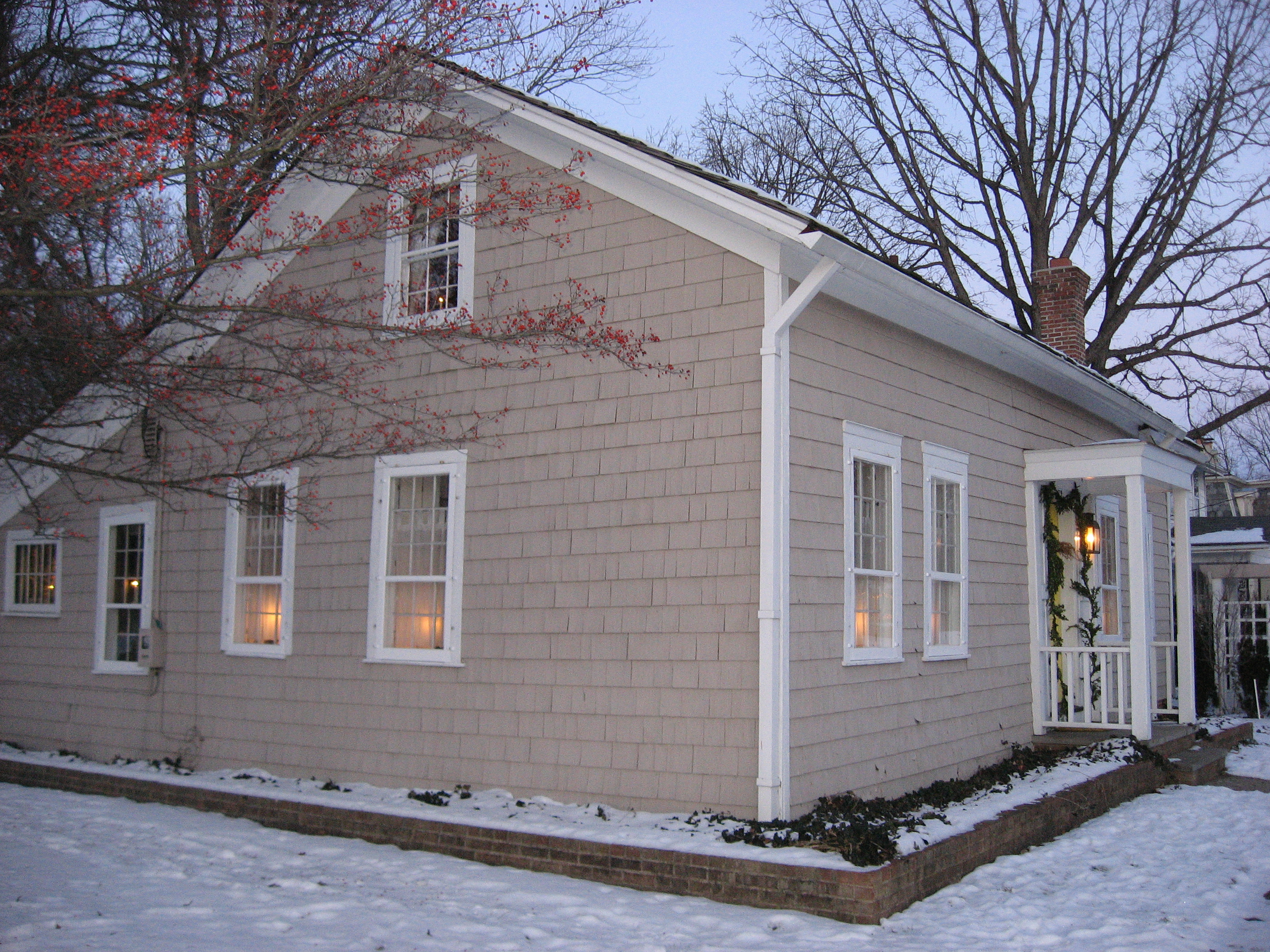
- Front and side of the house

- Location within Ohio Location within the United States
- Location: 72 E. Granville Rd., Worthington, Ohio
- Coordinates: 40°5′20.5″N 83°0′57″W
- Area: Less than 1 acre (0.40 ha)
- Built: 1825
- Part of: Worthington Historic District (ID10000190)
- MPS: Worthington MRA
- NRHP reference No.: 80003016
- Added to NRHP: April 17, 1980

The Gilbert House is a small historic residence in the city of Worthington, Ohio, United States. Constructed in the 1820s and later moved to the present location, it has been named a historic site.

Ezra Gilbert and his wife were among Worthington's earlier settlers, and they lived in the community into their old age. Events on their sixtieth anniversary in 1888 prompted Mrs. Gilbert to help fund a rectory for the nearby St. John's Episcopal Church. In the 1840s, they moved into the present house, which had been built in the 1820s; originally located elsewhere, it was relocated to the present site. Its new location made it a neighbor of St. John's Episcopal Church, as well as of the Worthington School, constructed in 1874 immediately to the west; Kilbourne Middle School now occupies the site. It later become home to the families of Travis Scott and James Ventresca.

The Gilberts' house is a small building without a specific architectural style. Covered with shingles, the walls rise to an asphalt roof and sit on a stone foundation. The front of the house rises to a shallow gable, while to the rear, the roof becomes less steep before pivoting 90° and becoming perpendicular to the roof of the rest of the house. The overall design creates an appearance resembling a saltbox, although modifications have been made since construction.

In April 1980, the Gilbert House was listed on the National Register of Historic Places, qualifying because of its historically significant architecture, for the building is a little-modified example of worker housing from the early nineteenth century. It was one of approximately twenty Worthington locations added to the National Register together as part of a multiple property submission. The house also lies within the boundaries of the Register-listed Worthington Historic District.
