= Mount Gilbert =

Mount Gilbert can refer to:

- Mount Gilbert (Alaska) in Alaska, USA
- Mount Gilbert (Chugach Mountains) in Alaska, USA
- Mount Gilbert (Antarctica)
- Mount Gilbert (California) in California, USA
- Mount Gilbert (Nevada) in Nevada, USA
- Mount Gilbert (British Columbia), in the Pacific Ranges of the Coast Mountains
- Mount Gilbert (Northern Ireland), near Belfast
