= Horace Gilbert House =

- Horace Gilbert/Morgan and Enos Miller House
- U.S. National Register of Historic Places
- Michigan State Historic Site
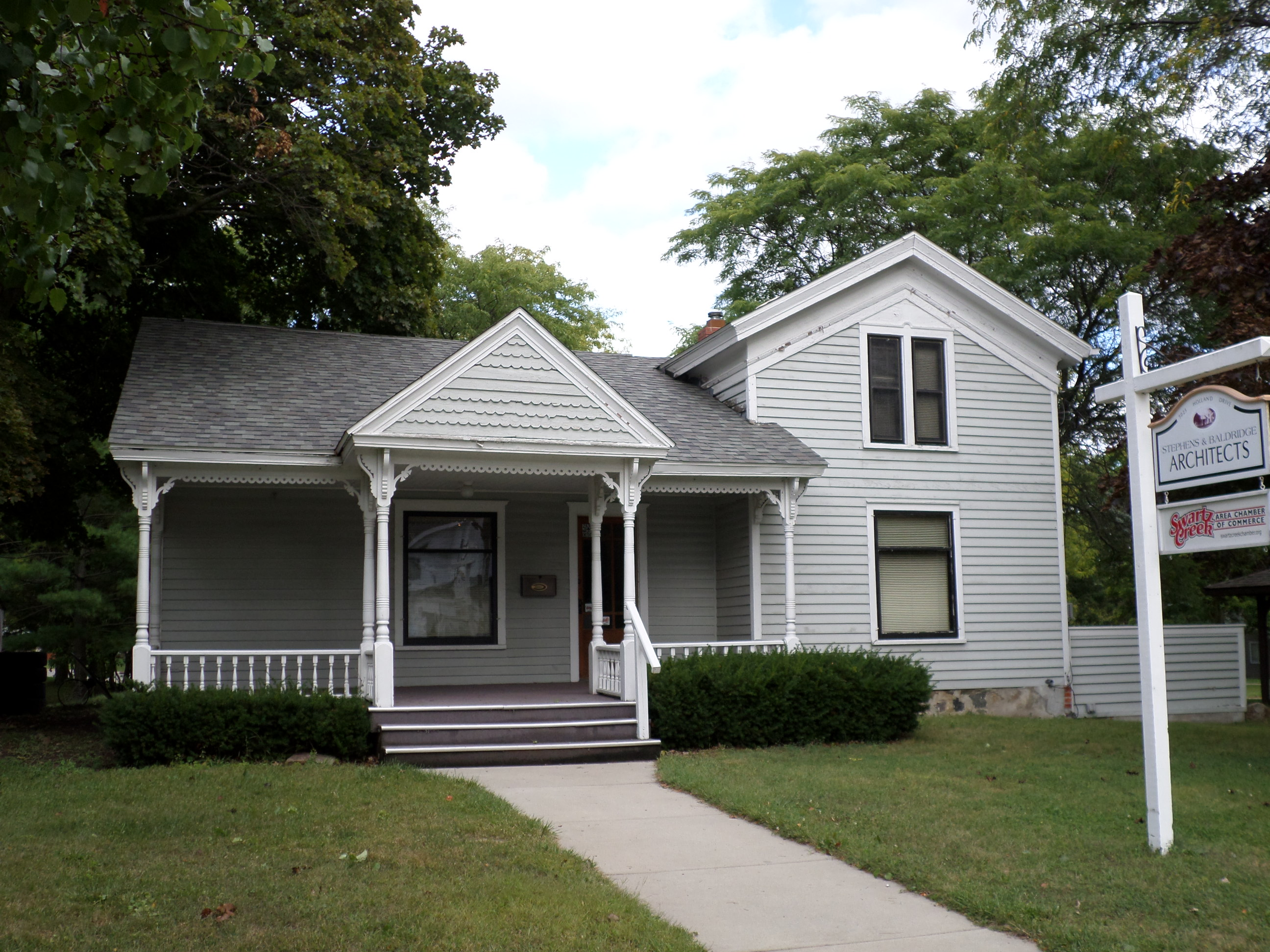
- Interactive map
- Location: 5023 Holland Dr., Swartz Creek, Michigan
- Coordinates: 42°57′24″N 83°49′54″W
- Area: less than one acre
- Built: 1870
- Architectural style: Queen Anne
- MPS: Genesee County MRA
- NRHP reference No.: 82000509
- Added to NRHP: November 26, 1982

The Horace Gilbert House, also known as the Morgan and Enos Miller House, is a single family home located at 5023 Holland Drive in Swartz Creek, Michigan. It was listed on the National Register of Historic Places in 1982.

== History ==
In 1870, Horace Gilbert built this house. It was purchased in 1902 by Morgan Miller, son of prominent citizen Enos Miller. Enos Miller and his wife Martha retired to this hose and lived there until their deaths in 1920 and 1905. The house was restored in 1976.

== Description ==
The house is an L-shaped structure with simple detailing, including corner boards and a wide frieze below a boxed cornice. The front porch shows Queen Anne style detailing such as shingling on the gable, scalloped bargeboards, and decorative turned brackets.
