= Gilbert Building =

Gilbert Building may refer to:

- Gilbert Building (Beaumont, Texas) in Beaumont, Texas, listed on the National Register of Historic Places in Jefferson County, Texas
- Gilbert Building (Portland, Oregon), listed on the National Register of Historic Places in Multnomah County, Oregon
- Gilbert Building (Philadelphia, Pennsylvania), listed on the National Register of Historic Places in Philadelphia County, Pennsylvania

== See also ==
- Gilbert House (disambiguation)
