= Henry Gilbert House =

- U.S. National Register of Historic Places
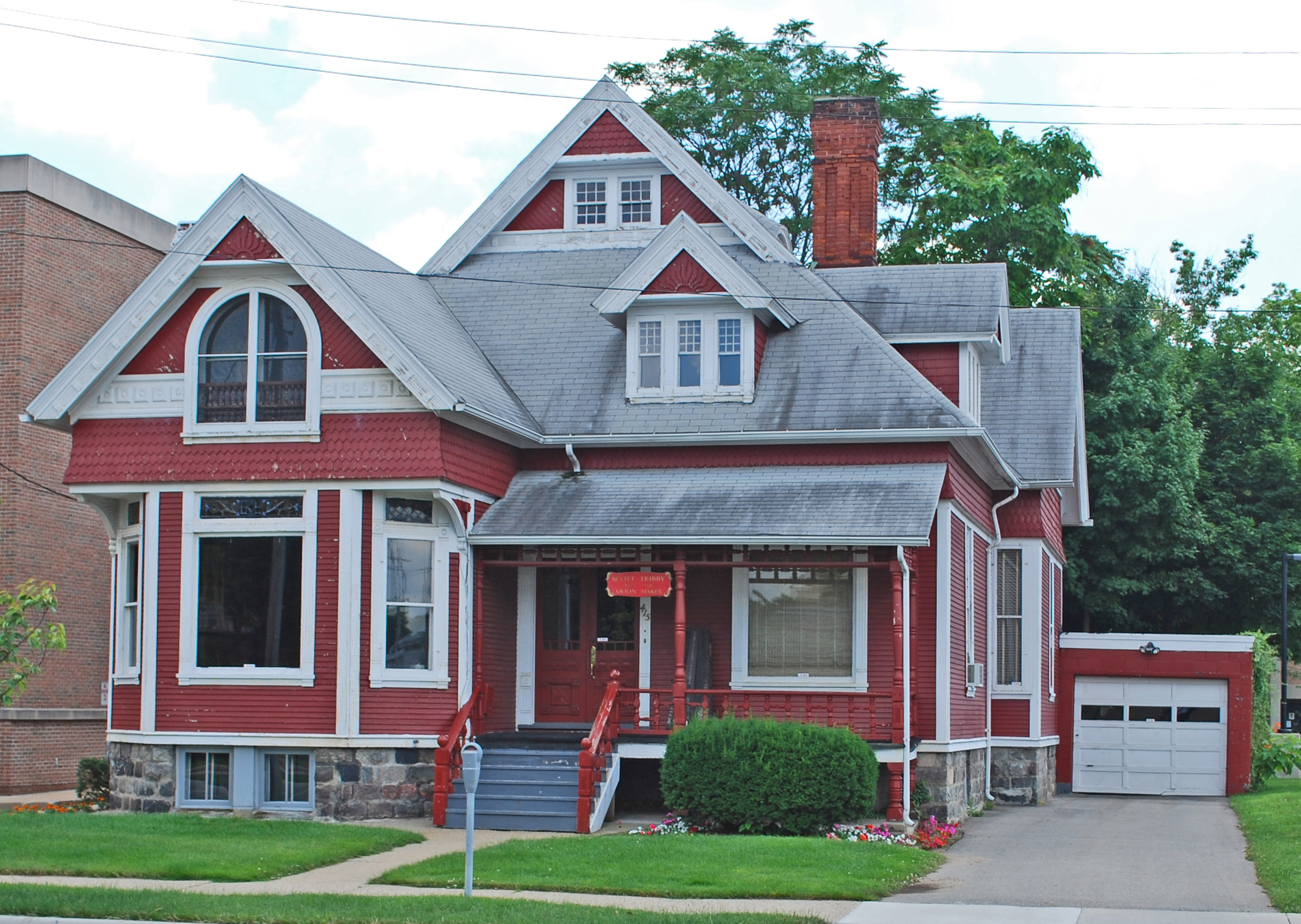
- Interactive map
- Location: 415 W. Lovell, Kalamazoo, Michigan
- Coordinates: 42°17′19″N 85°35′16″W
- Area: less than one acre
- Built: 1888
- Architectural style: Queen Anne
- MPS: Kalamazoo MRA
- NRHP reference No.: 83000859
- Added to NRHP: May 27, 1983

The Henry Gilbert House is a single-family home located at 415 West Lovell in Kalamazoo, Michigan. It was listed on the National Register of Historic Places in 1983.

== History ==
Henry Gilbert was born in Rushville, New York in 1810. He began a career as a printer in New York, and in 1835 moved to Kalamazoo. He soon became publisher and editor of the Kalamazoo Gazette. Gilbert held a number of local political offices, and in 1856 was elected village president of Kalamazoo. He later left the newspaper business for a series of commercial ventures, including a furniture manufacturing business that made him the wealthiest man in Kalamazoo by 1870. However, Gilbert lost a fair amount of his fortune, and in 1888 retired to this newly built home. Gilbert lived here with his second wife until 1898, when both of them died on the same day.

The house was later owned by industrialist Dimmen denBleyker, son of Dutch pioneer Paulus denBleyker. William Shakespeare Jr., a local civic and business leader, also lived here. Shakespeare founded the Shakespeare Company, a manufacturer of fishing equipment. Shakespeare served on the first city commission and was elected mayor of the city in 1933.

== Description ==
The Henry Glibert House is a small frame Queen Anne structure. The house is notable for its fine detailing, including round- and pointed-butt gable shingling, sunburst detailing in the gables, bullseye-pattern decorative aprons, and door and window trim corner blocks. The house also has elaborately trimmed front double doors, colored glass transoms above many of the windows, and chimney stacks with corbeled and paneled brickwork.
