= Millers, Nevada =

- Ghost town
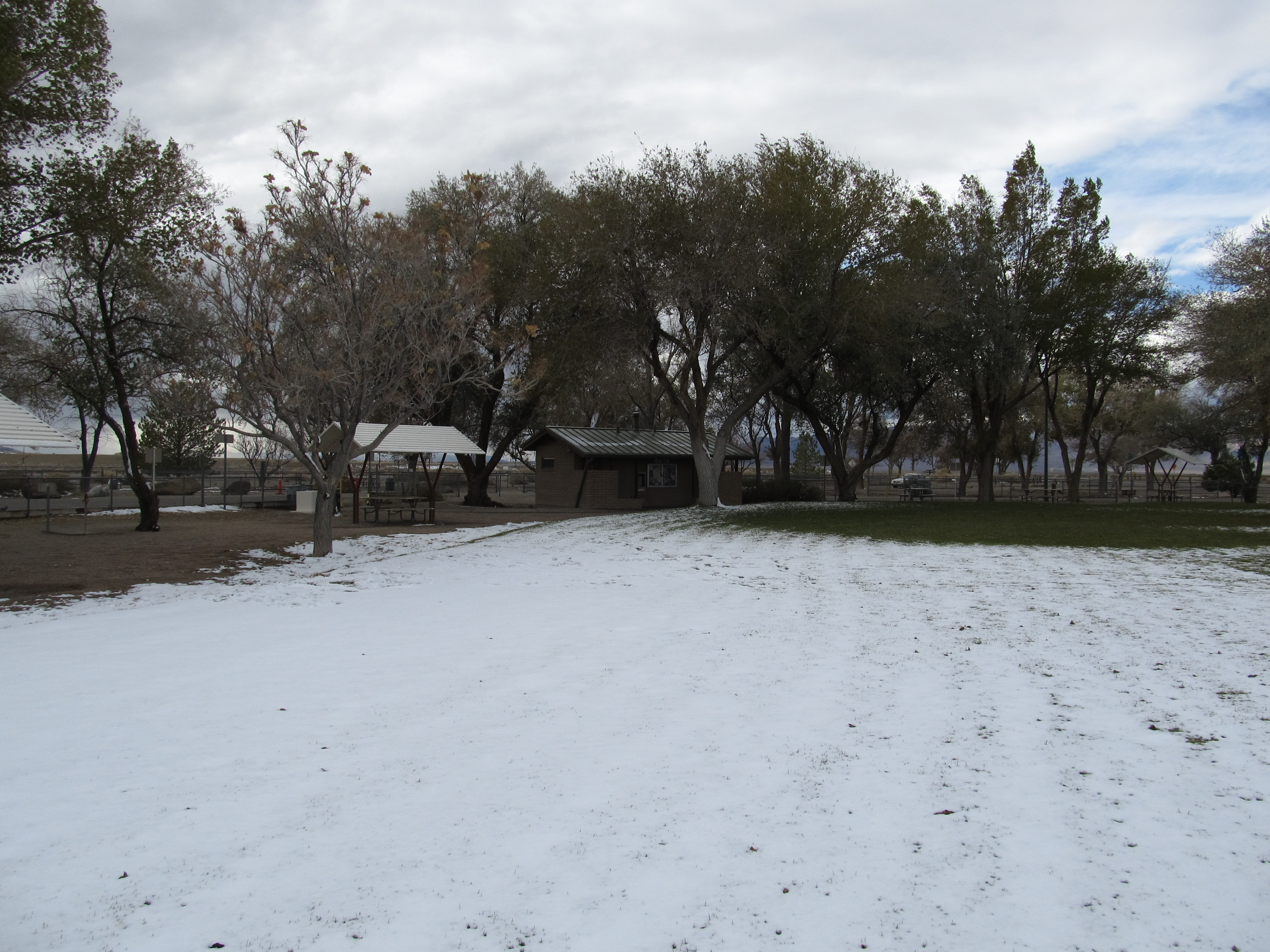

- Location within Nevada Location within the United States
- Coordinates: 38°08′12″N 117°27′27″W
- Country: United States
- State: Nevada
- County: Esmeralda
- Named for: Charles R. Miller
- Elevation: 4,823 ft (1,470 m)
- GNIS feature ID: 856083

Millers (also spelled Miller's) is a ghost town located in Esmeralda County, Nevada. Deserted today, Millers sprang up as a mining boomtown after the Tonopah boom began.

== History ==
Millers came to life as a result of the furor in Tonopah. In 1901 the Tonopah and Goldfield Railroad was constructed and by 1904 Millers was founded as a station and watering stop along the rail line.

The name of the town honors Charles R. Miller, a director of the railroad who was also once the Governor of Delaware. Miller also worked as vice president of the Tonopah Mining Company and played a key role in bringing that company's 100-stamp cyanide mill built in Millers in 1906.

The post office at Millers was in operation from January 1906 until September 1919 and then from February 1921 until December 1931. In 1907 the railroad company constructed repair shops in Millers and another large mill went up. By 1910 Millers had a business district and a population of 274. A year later, in 1911, the railroad shops and mill had moved and the town began a slow decline. By 1941, Millers had 28 inhabitants. When the railroad went under in 1947, the town of Millers followed suit and became a ghost town.

As Millers is almost exactly half way between Reno and Las Vegas, a rest area at that location was completed in 1970. In 1971, a historical marker was set to be placed there.
