= California State Route 266 =

Highway in California

State Route 266
- SR 266 highlighted in red

Route information
- Maintained by Caltrans
- Length: 11.721 mi (18.863 km)

Major junctions
- South end: SR 266 at Nevada state line towards Lida, NV
- SR 168 at Oasis
- North end: SR 264 at Nevada state line towards Dyer, NV

Location
- Country: United States
- State: California
- Counties: Mono

Highway system
- State highways in California; Interstate; US; State; Scenic; History; Pre‑1964; Unconstructed; Deleted; Freeways
← SR 265	→ SR 267

State Route 266 (SR 266) is a state highway in the U.S. state of California. The route traverses Fish Lake Valley, which is part in California and part in Nevada. The route connects two Nevada state routes that traverse the Nevada portion of the valley, SR 264 and SR 266. The only connection from SR 266 to the rest of California's road network is via SR 168 in the community of Oasis. Prior to 1986 the southern and northern halves of modern SR 266 had separate numerical designations. The southern portion of the highway, along with modern SR 168, dates to the auto trail era, forming part of the Midland Trail.

== Route description ==
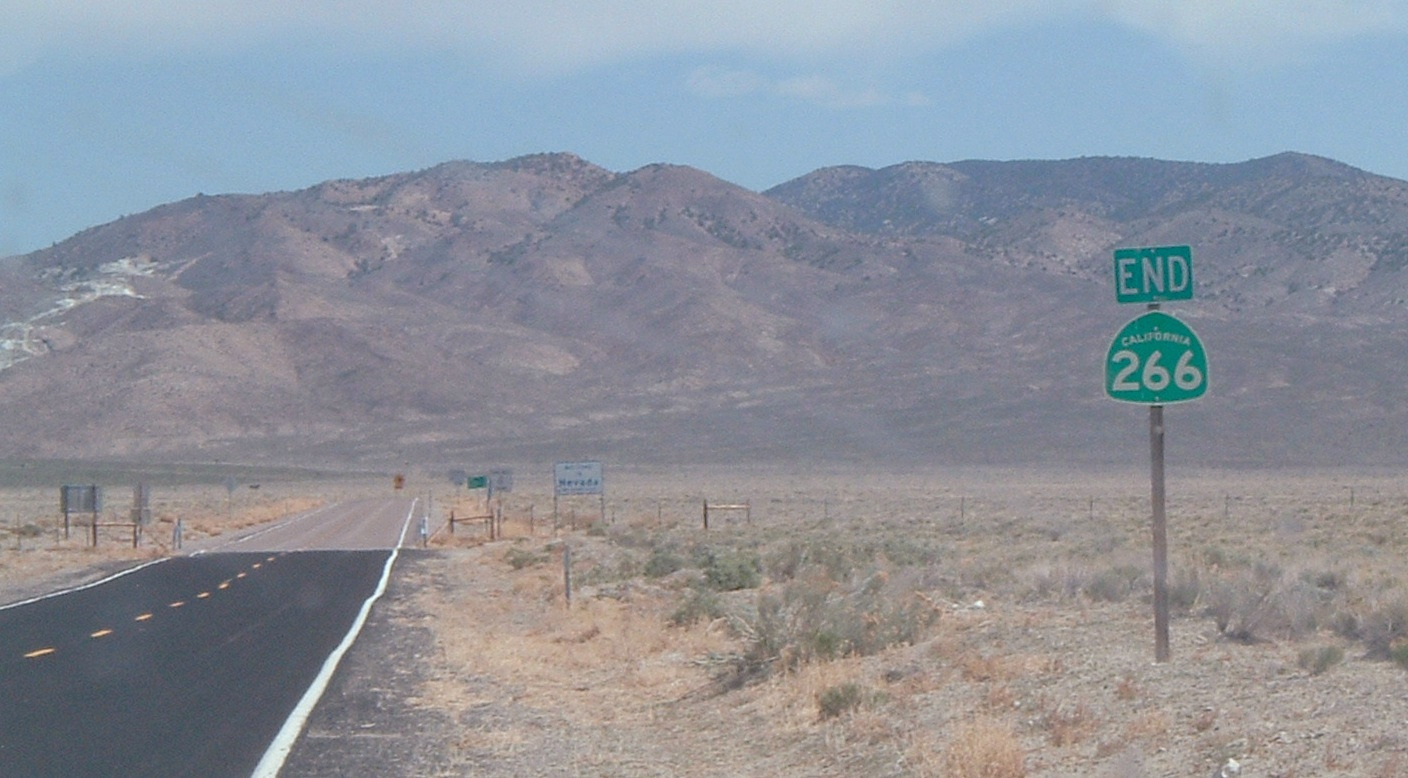
Southern terminus of SR 266 at the Nevada state line; the "Welcome to Nevada" sign can be seen in the background.

Route 266 is defined in section 566 of the California Streets and Highways Code, and that the highway is "from the Nevada state line easterly of Oasis to the Nevada state line northerly of Oasis".

SR 266 begins at the western terminus of SR 266 at the Nevada state line. The route travels west-northwest, then turns to the west for another 1.8 miles (2.9 km) before approaching Oasis, the only community through which the route passes. At Oasis, SR 266 intersects SR 168, which serves as the gateway into the Owens Valley from Nevada. Upon leaving Oasis, SR 266 continues to the west briefly, then turns north-northwest. Within the last 7 miles (11 km), SR 266 slowly curves northwest as the route approaches the Nevada state line. The route ends at the state line at the southern terminus of SR 264. As the route has more connections to Nevada than the rest of California, the California Department of Transportation (Caltrans) and the Nevada Department of Transportation (NDOT) have entered into a joint agreement on snow removal and other short term maintenance duties for the route.

The section of SR 266 from the western terminus to the junction with SR 168 is designated by the California State Legislature as eligible by law for the State Scenic Highway System; but it is not officially designated as a scenic highway by Caltrans. The entire route, consisting of two lanes for two-way traffic, traverses on the flat land in the Fish Lake Valley east of the White Mountains, and it can serve as transportation of agricultural goods between California and Nevada via the route's only junction (SR 168). In the event that SR 168 is closed, SR 266 connects to SR 264, which intersects with U.S. Route 6 (US 6) in order to provide an alternate access to California.

== History ==
The southern half of modern SR 266 (from Oasis to SR 266 near Lida, Nevada) predates the era of numbered highways and formed part of the Midland Trail, one of the first auto trails crossing the entire country. Construction for a road from Oasis to the Nevada state line to be added to the State Highway System was authorized in 1931. This road was initially designated Legislative Route 63 and later signed as SR 168. In 1965, Route 266 was designated incorporating what is the northern half of modern SR 266 connecting with modern SR 264, using the alignment of an existing Mono County road. In 1986, the definition of SR 266 was extended to its modern form, with both termini at the Nevada state line, absorbing what was previously a portion of SR 168. With this change Nevada and California routes 266 connected at the state line.

== Major intersections ==
Except where prefixed with a letter, postmiles were measured on the road as it was in 1964, based on the alignment that existed at the time, and do not necessarily reflect current mileage. Postmile prefixes include: R reflecting a realignment in the route since then, M indicating a second realignment, L referring to an overlap due to a correction or change, and T indicating postmiles classified as temporary. Segments that remain unconstructed or have been relinquished to local control may be omitted. The entire route is in Mono County.

Location	Postmile	Destinations	Notes
	0.00	SR 266 east to US 95	Continuation into Nevada; southern end of SR 266
Oasis	4.30	SR 168 west – Big Pine	
	11.72	SR 264 north to US 6 – Dyer	Continuation into Nevada; northern end of SR 266
1.000 mi = 1.609 km; 1.000 km = 0.621 mi
