= Nevada State Route 266 =

Highway in Nevada

State Route 266
- Lida Road

Route information
- Maintained by NDOT
- Length: 40.338 mi (64.918 km)
- Existed: July 1, 1976–present

Major junctions
- West end: SR 266 at the California state line near Oasis, CA
- East end: Future I-11 / US 95 in Lida Junction

Location
- Country: United States
- State: Nevada
- County: Esmeralda

Highway system
- Nevada State Highway System; Interstate; US; State; Pre‑1976; Scenic
← SR 265	→ SR 267

State Route 266 (SR 266) is a 40.338-mile (64.918 km) state highway in Esmeralda County, Nevada, United States. It connects the routing of California State Route 266 east to U.S. Route 95 (US 95) via the town of Lida. Lida Road previously carried the southern end of State Route 3.

== Route description ==
State Route 266 begins at the California state line about 4 miles (6.4 km) east of Oasis, California. From there, the highway makes its way east through the mountainous terrain and the Lida Summit (elevation 7,420 feet (2,260 m)) to the community of Lida.

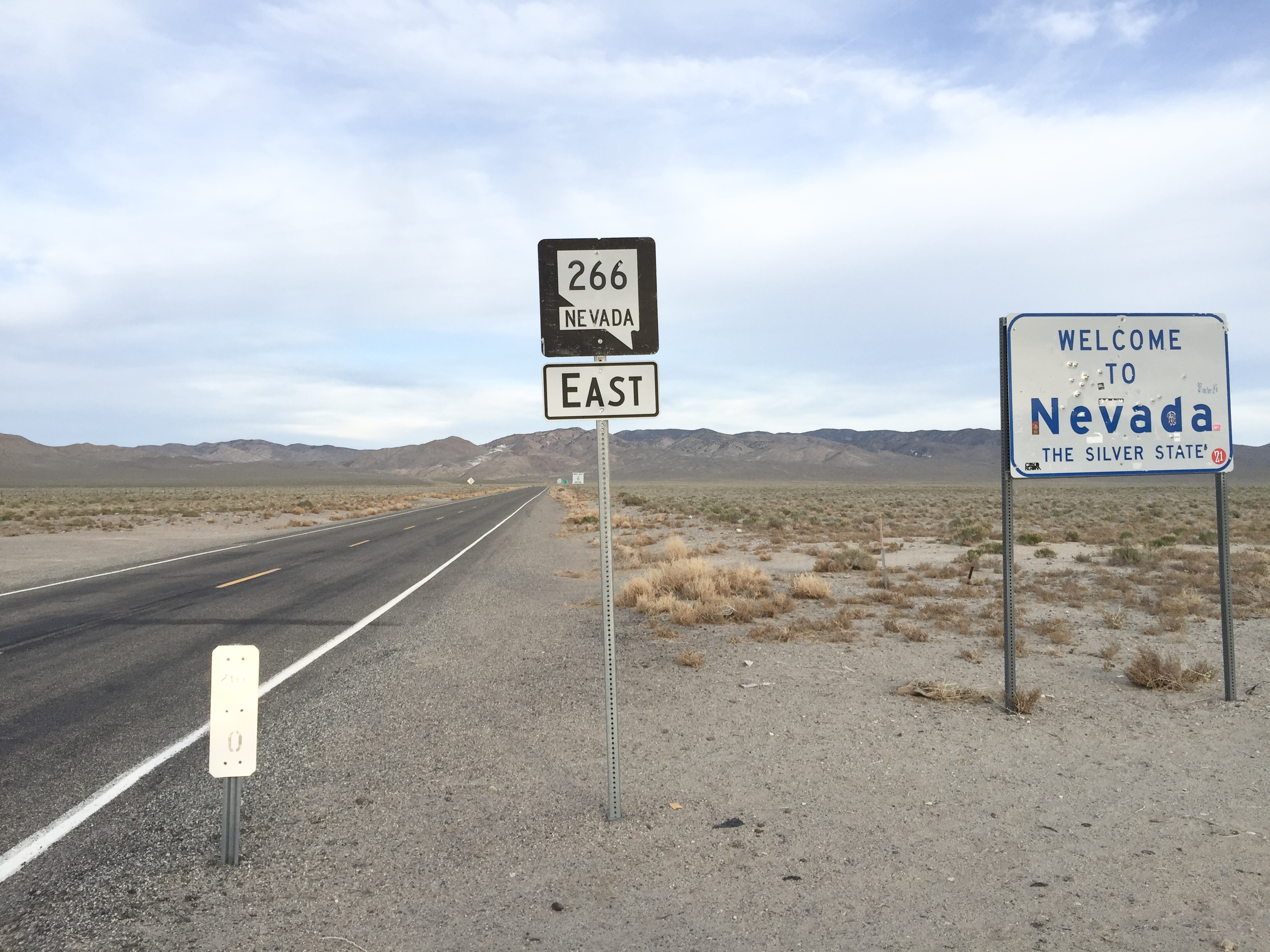
View from the west end of SR 266 looking eastbound as seen in 2015

Once it exits the town, the route continues east through the open desert. SR 266 reaches its eastern terminus at the Lida Junction, an intersection with US 95 14 miles (23 km) south of Goldfield. On the south side of the highway is the Lida Junction Airport—which was originally built to provide more convenient access to the now defunct Cottontail Ranch, located immediately southwest of the highway junction.

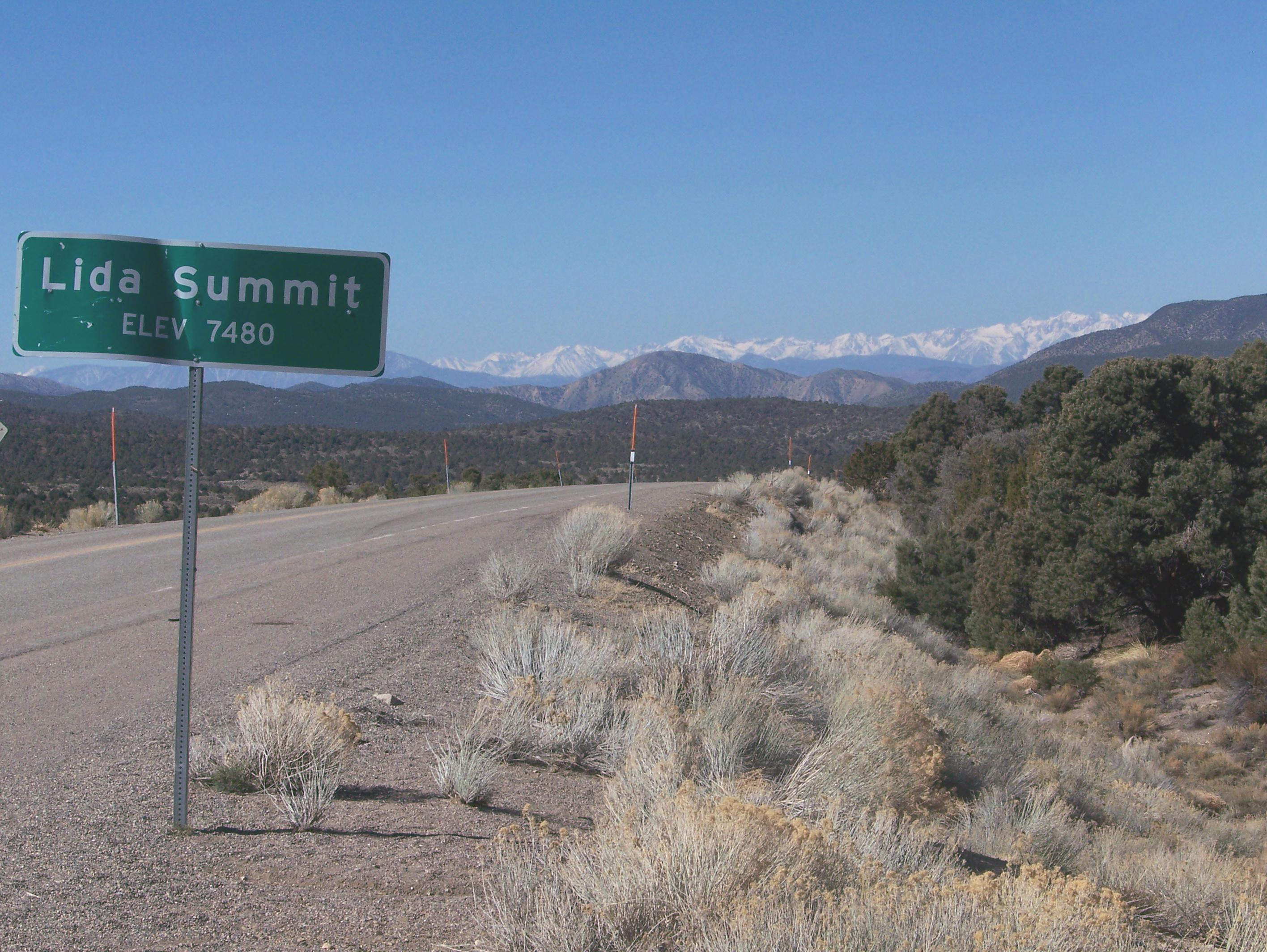
Looking westbound on SR 266 at the Lida Summit as seen in 2009

== History ==
SR 266 was a part of State Route 3 from 1917 to 1976

SR 266 originally began as the southernmost segment of State Route 3, one of Nevada's first four state highways designated with the creation of the Nevada Department of Highways in 1917. Maps dating back to 1917 show SR 3 curving northward a few miles east of Lida on its trek towards Goldfield and points further north. The eastern portion of the present-day route was constructed as a graded highway by 1937, with the new alignment replacing the unimproved northeast leg by 1940. The entire alignment was paved by 1960.

SR 3 was officially eliminated from the state highway system as part of a mass renumbering of Nevada's state routes. State Route 266 was assigned to this former alignment of SR 3 on July 1, 1976. The resulting change in the highway's number was first seen on the 1978–79 edition of the official highway map.

== Major intersections ==
The entire route is in Esmeralda County.

Location	mi	km	Destinations	Notes
	0.000	0.000	SR 266 north – Fish Lake Valley	Continuation beyond the California state line
			SR 774 south – Gold Point	Northern terminus of SR 774
Lida Junction	40.338	64.918	US 95 – Goldfield, Beatty	Eastern terminus
1.000 mi = 1.609 km; 1.000 km = 0.621 mi
