= Nevada State Route 773 =

Highway in Nevada

State Route 773
- Fish Lake Valley Road
- SR 773 highlighted in red

Route information
- Maintained by NDOT
- Length: 10.496 mi (16.892 km)
- Existed: 1976–present

Major junctions
- South end: SR 264 near Fish Lake Valley
- North end: US 6 near Coaldale

Location
- Country: United States
- State: Nevada

Highway system
- Nevada State Highway System; Interstate; US; State; Pre‑1976; Scenic
← SR 767	→ SR 774

State Route 773 (SR 773) is a 10.496-mile-long (16.892 km) state highway in Esmeralda County, Nevada, United States. Known as Fish Lake Valley Road, the highway was a part of former SR 3A.

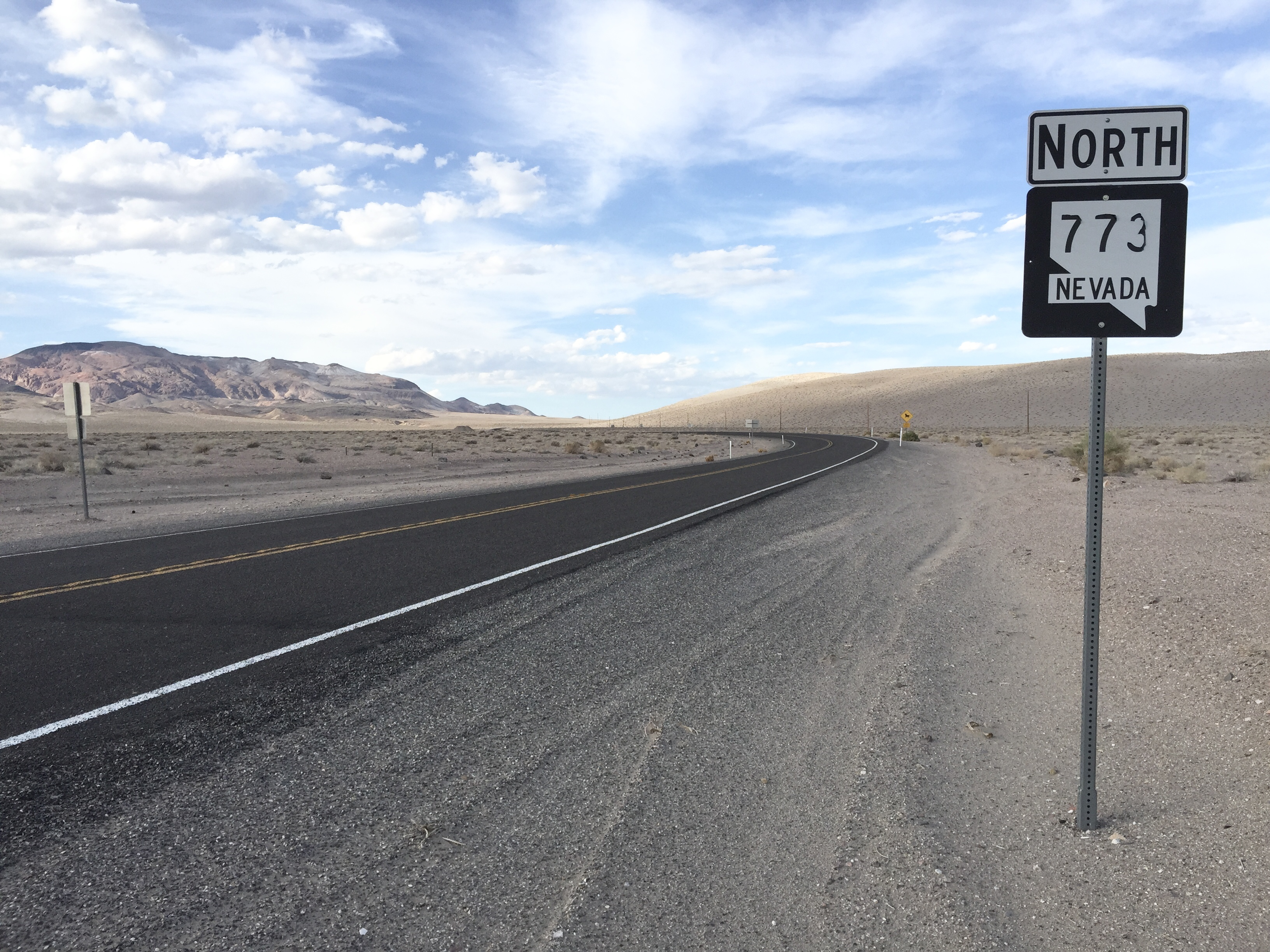
View at the south end of SR 773 looking northbound

== Route description ==
SR 773 begins at a junction with State Route 264 north of Fish Lake Valley. The route follows Fish Lake Valley Road northeast to its terminus at U.S. Route 6 (US 6), about 6 miles (9.7 km) west of Coaldale.

== History ==
The highway originally composed the northern 10 miles (16 km) of State Route 3A, a route christened in 1933 to connect State Route 15 (now US 6) to Fish Lake Valley and Dyer. SR 3A was replaced by State Route 773 and State Route 264 on July 1, 1976. SR 773 did not appear on state highway maps until 1991.

== Major intersections ==
Mileposts on the highway are a continuation of State Route 264 mileposts. The entire route is in Esmeralda County.

Location	mi	km	Destinations	Notes
	25.46	40.97	SR 264	
	35.86	57.71	US 6 – Tonopah, Bishop	
1.000 mi = 1.609 km; 1.000 km = 0.621 mi
