= Nevada State Route 264 =

State highway in Esmeralda County, Nevada, United States

State Route 264
- Fish Lake Valley Road, Dicalite Cutoff

Route information
- Maintained by NDOT
- Length: 33.667 mi (54.182 km)
- Existed: 1976–present

Major junctions
- South end: SR 266 towards Oasis, CA
- North end: US 6 near Basalt

Location
- Country: United States
- State: Nevada
- Counties: Esmeralda

Highway system
- Nevada State Highway System; Interstate; US; State; Pre‑1976; Scenic
← SR 233	→ SR 265

State Route 264 (SR 264) is a 33.67-mile (54.19 km) state highway in Esmeralda County, Nevada, United States. It connects California State Route 266 to U.S. Route 6 (US 6) via the town of Dyer, Nevada. The majority of the route is known as Fish Lake Valley Road, with the northern portion referred to as the Dicalite Cutoff. A majority of the route was originally designated State Route 3A.

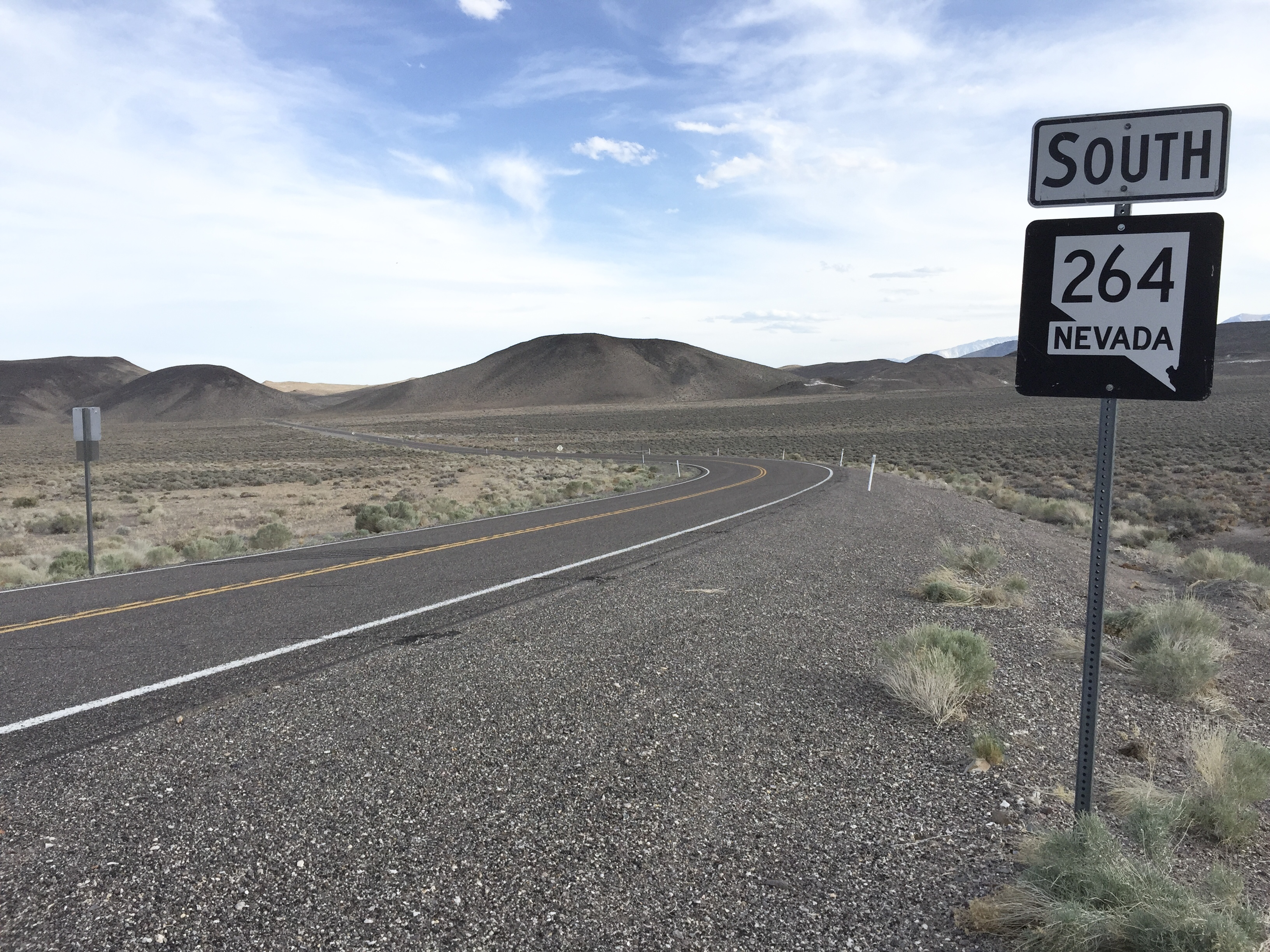
View from the north end of SR 264 looking southbound

== Route description ==
SR 264 begins at the California State line approximately 4.3 miles (6.9 km) north of Oasis, California on California State Route 266. From there, the highway follows Fish Lake Valley Road north to pass through the small community of Dyer. As the route heads north from Dyer through Fish Lake Valley, Boundary Peak, the highest point in the state of Nevada, comes into view on the west side of the highway. About 15 miles (24 km) north of Dyer is a junction with State Route 773, where Fish Lake Valley Road turns off of the route. At this point, SR 264 curves northwest to follow the Dicalite Cutoff. The route reaches its terminus at US 6, approximately 5 miles (8.0 km) east of Basalt.

== History ==
The southern 25 miles (40 km) of State Route 264 and all of State Route 773 were both previously designated State Route 3A.

Much of SR 264 was originally designated State Route 3A.

SR 3A first appears on state highway maps in 1933 as an unimproved road stretching from the California–Nevada state line to the junction of State Route 3 (now US 95) and State Route 15 (now US 6) at Coaldale. The route's northern terminus appears to have been shifted 8 miles (13 km) west of Coaldale around 1937. By 1941, SR 3A had been relocated to a new gravel road alignment which resembles that of present-day SR 264 and SR 773. The road was paved between US 6 and Dyer by 1949, and the remainder of the route received pavement by 1953.

The Dicalite Cutoff first appears on the state map in 1978. This was also the first edition to show State Route 3A being replaced by State Route 264 as part of the statewide renumbering of Nevada's highway system. The designations for current SR 264 and SR 773 were approved by the Nevada Department of Highways on July 1, 1976—the routing of these highways north of Fish Lake Valley was not made clear on state maps until 1991, when SR 773 was finally shown on the map.

== Major intersections ==
The entire route is in Esmeralda County.

Location	mi	km	Destinations	Notes
	0.00	0.00	SR 266	Continuation beyond California state line
	25.46	40.97	SR 773 (Fish Lake Valley Road)	
	33.67	54.19	US 6 – Tonopah, Bishop	
1.000 mi = 1.609 km; 1.000 km = 0.621 mi
