= Oasis, California =

Oasis, California may refer to:

- Oasis, Mendocino County, California
- Oasis, Mono County, California
- Oasis, Riverside County, California
