= Fish Lake Hot Well =

Thermal spring

- Fish Lake Hot Spring; Fish Lake Valley Hot Well
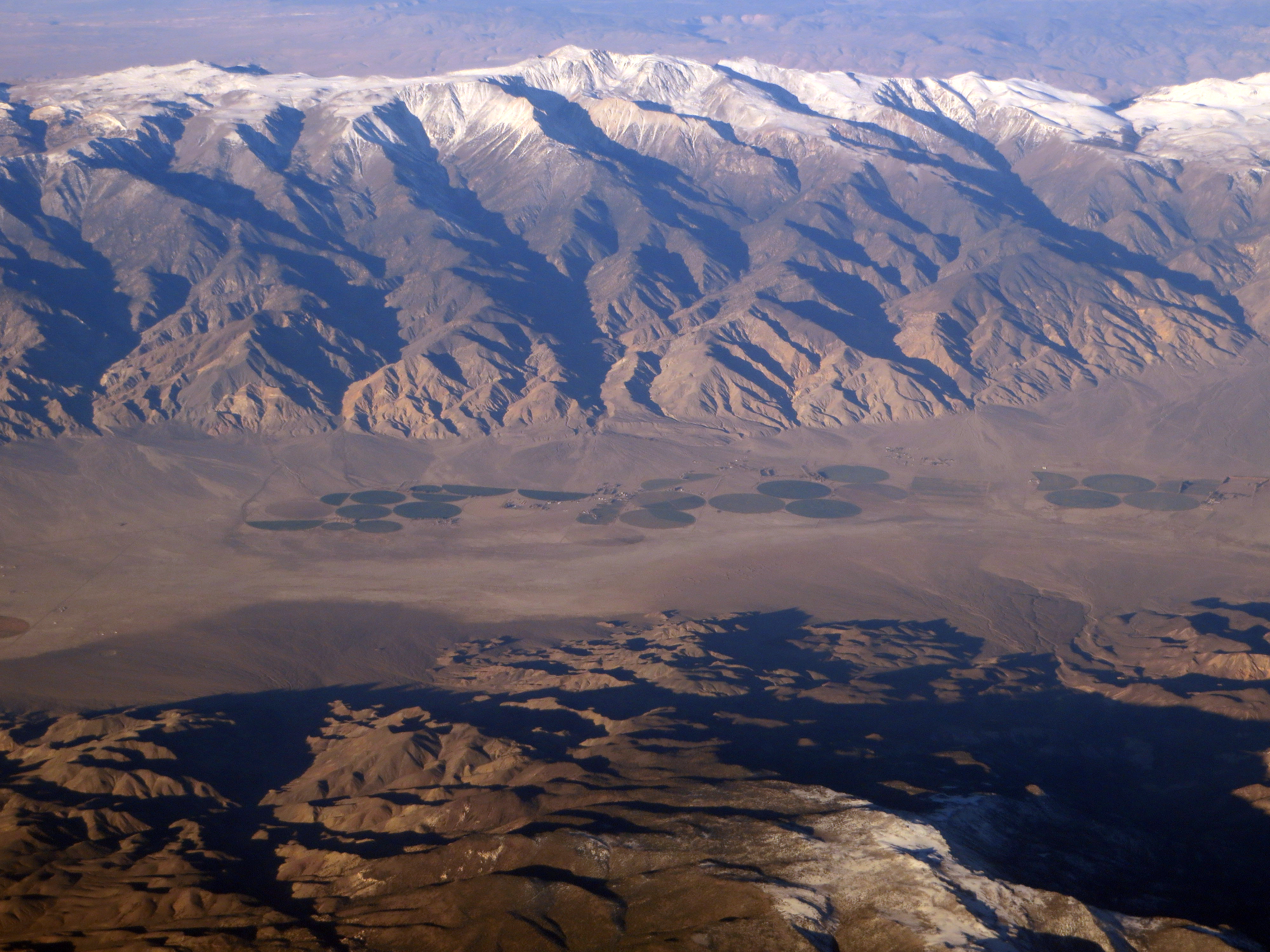
- Fish Lake Valley
- Interactive map of Fish Lake Hot Well
- Location: Near the town of Dyer, Nevada
- Coordinates: 37°51′35″N 117°59′02″W
- Elevation: 4,800 ft (1,500 m)
- Type: Geothermal
- Discharge: 50+ gallons per minute
- Temperature: 85 °F (29 °C)

Fish Lake Hot Well, also known as Fish Lake Hot Spring and Fish Lake Valley Hot Well, is a geothermal hot spring in Nevada.

== Location ==
The spring is located in the Fish Lake Valley near the town of Dyer, Nevada. The White Mountains and the 13,146 foot high Boundary Peak are visible from the springs. The hot spring is surrounded by mountains, and the Boundary Peak Wilderness area is visible from the spring.

== History and description ==
In the 1880s ranchers drilling for oil discovered the hot well. It was later surrounded by a well casing. Later a six-foot square concrete soaking area was added surrounded by a cement deck and wooden benches. The soaking pool over-flows into a man-made swimming hole that has been stocked with large goldfish. This warm pond flows into a second and third pond. All of the soaking pools/ponds are different temperatures, ranging from 85°F to 105°F. The main gravel-bottomed soaking pool is surrounded by a concrete deck and is 12' x 6'. The water then flows into several smaller, rock-lined primitive pools. There is a parking area, pit toilets, trash receptacles, barbeque pits and free camping near by.

There is interest in the geothermal energy resources in the area near the hot springs.

== Water profile ==
The hot mineral water emerges from the ground at a rate of 50+ gallons per minute at 105°F.

== See also ==
- List of hot springs in the United States
- List of hot springs in the world
