= Nevada State Route 488 =

Highway in Nevada

State Route 488
- Lehman Caves Road
- SR 488 highlighted in red

Route information
- Maintained by NDOT
- Length: 4.786 mi (7.702 km)
- Existed: 1976–present
- History: Established as SR 74 by 1937

Major junctions
- West end: Great Basin National Park
- East end: SR 487 in Baker

Location
- Country: United States
- State: Nevada
- County: White Pine

Highway system
- Nevada State Highway System; Interstate; US; State; Pre‑1976; Scenic
← SR 487	→ SR 490

State Route 488 (SR 488) is an east–west state highway in White Pine County, Nevada. The route covers Lehman Caves Road connecting the town of Baker to Great Basin National Park. The route existed as State Route 74 prior to 1976. SR 488 has been designated a Nevada Scenic Byway.

== Route description ==
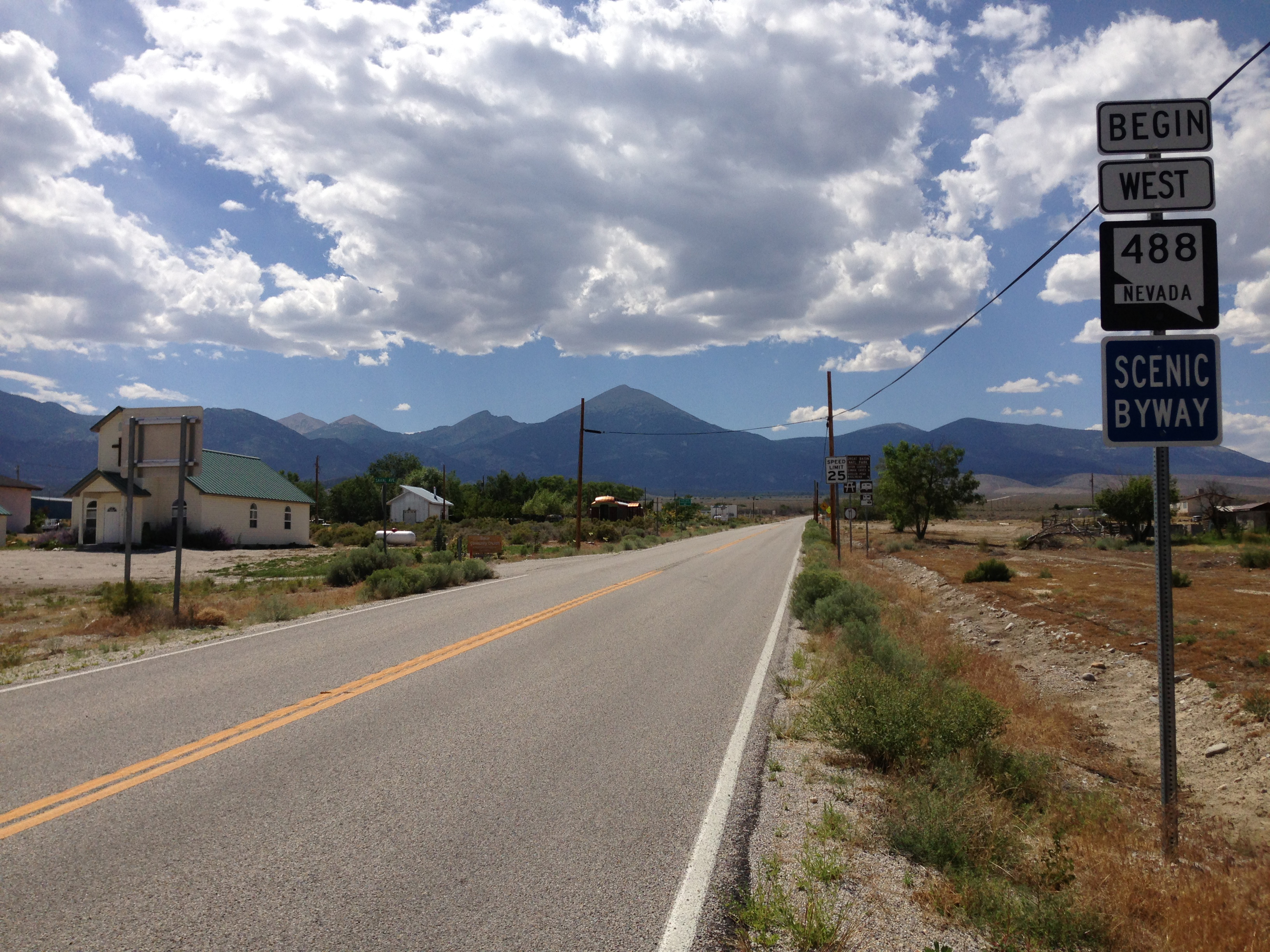
First reassurance sign along westbound SR 488 in Baker

SR 488 begins at a cattle guard on Lehman Caves Road, 0.707 miles (1.138 km) east of the Lehman Caves Visitor Center and main roadway entrance to the developed areas of Great Basin National Park. From there, the route travels easterly through desert terrain, roughly paralleling the course of Lehman Creek as it travels down towards the town of Baker. The highway ends at an intersection with Baker Road (SR 487) in Baker.

== History ==
An unimproved road connecting Lehman Caves to the state highway system first appears on official Nevada state highway maps as far back as 1937, although this road traveled more northeasterly than the current alignment of Lehman Caves Road and connected to Baker Road north of the town. This early iteration of State Route 74 was shown on some maps. However, the state's tourist maps did not show the existence of State Route 74 until 1942—by then, the highway route had been changed to its present-day alignment, meeting then-SR 73 at Baker. The new route was upgraded to a gravel road by 1948, and was fully paved by 1949.

SR 74 was eliminated from the state highway system as part of a mass renumbering of Nevada's state routes. State Route 488 was designated to replace SR 74 on July 1, 1976. This change in highway numbers was first seen on the 1978–79 edition of the state highway map. Since its re-designation as SR 488, Lehman Caves Road has not undergone any significant changes.

The Nevada Department of Transportation designated State Route 488 as a Nevada Scenic Byway on March 27, 2000, simultaneously with SR 487 and a nearby portion of U.S. Routes 6 and 50.

== Major intersections ==
The entire route is in White Pine County.

Location	mi	km	Destinations	Notes
	0.00	0.00	Lehman Caves Road (west) – Great Basin National Park	Continuation beyond western terminus
Baker	4.786	7.702	SR 487 north (Baker Road) – US 6/US 50, Ely, Delta (Utah) SR 487 south (Baker Road) – Garrison (Utah), Milford (Utah), Beaver (Utah)	Eastern terminus
1.000 mi = 1.609 km; 1.000 km = 0.621 mi
