= Nevada State Route 774 =

Highway in Nevada

State Route 774
- Gold Point Road
- SR 774 highlighted in red

Route information
- Maintained by NDOT
- Length: 7.455 mi (11.998 km)
- Existed: 1976–present
- History: SR 71 by 1942

Major junctions
- South end: 3rd St in Gold Point
- North end: SR 266 near Lida

Location
- Country: United States
- State: Nevada
- County: Esmeralda

Highway system
- Nevada State Highway System; Interstate; US; State; Pre‑1976; Scenic
| ← SR 773 | → SR 789 |

State Route 774 (SR 774) is a 7.455-mile (11.998 km) state highway in Esmeralda County, Nevada, United States. It is known as Gold Point Road, connecting the town of Gold Point to State Route 266. The route was originally part of former State Route 71.

== Route description ==
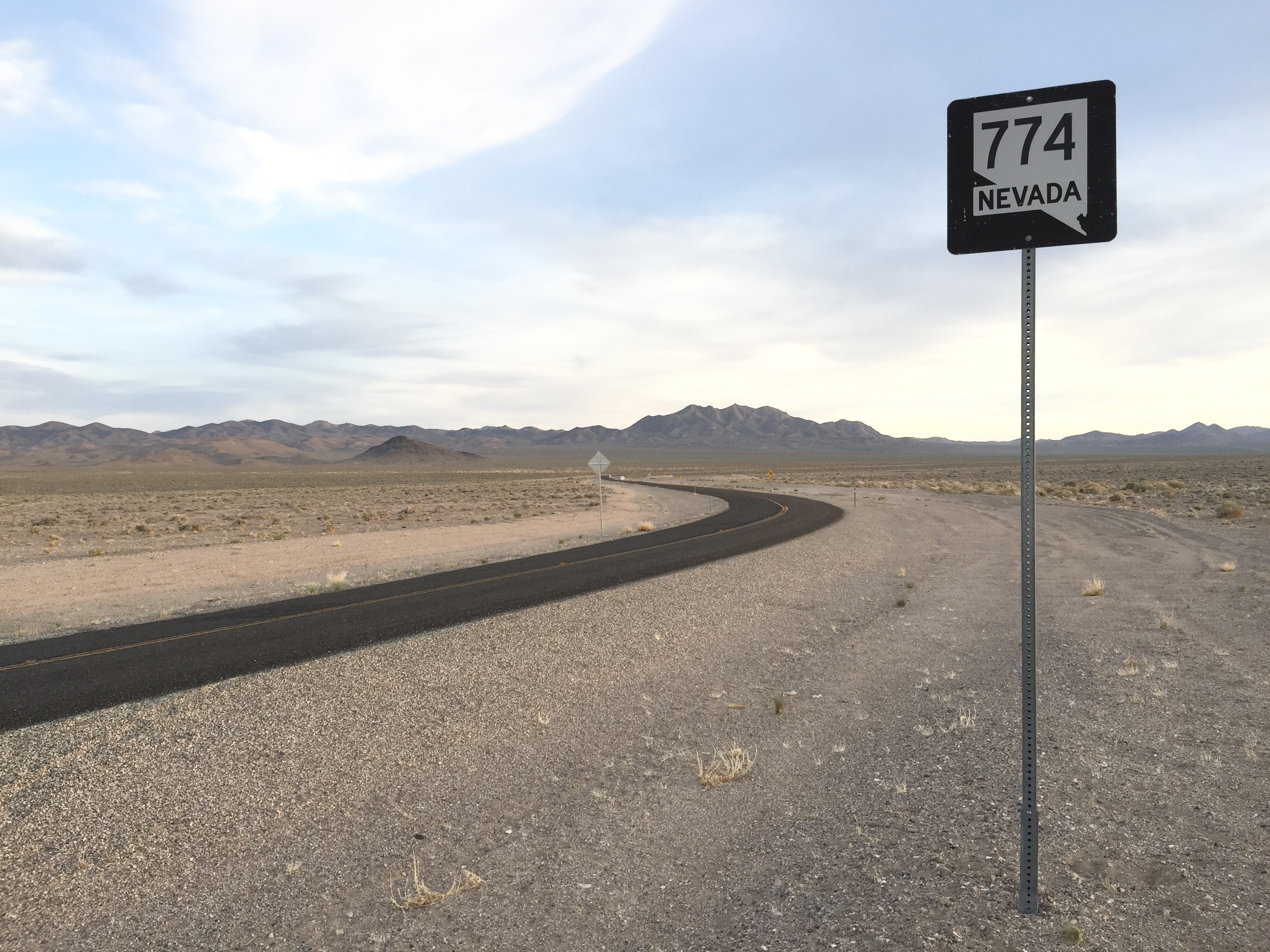
View at the north end of SR 774 looking southbound

The highway begins at Third Street in the middle of Gold Point. From there, the route heads northeast to its terminus approximately 12 miles (19 km) east of Lida on State Route 266.

== History ==
SR 774 was originally State Route 71

Gold Point Road first shows up on state highway maps in 1942 as State Route 71, an unimproved highway. The alignment followed that of the present-day SR 774 and extended further southwest of Gold Point to the California state line. With no major road or town connection beyond Gold Point into California, the southern end of SR 71 was truncated to Gold Point by 1968.

SR 71 was renumbered to State Route 774 on July 1, 1976, a change which first appeared on the state highway map in 1978.

SR 774 regularly appears on state highway maps beginning with the 1991–92 edition. By that time, it was the only state-maintained highway in Nevada that had not been constructed into a paved highway. Paving had taken place by 2002.

== Major intersections ==
Note: The route's mileposts are assigned from north to south. The entire route is in Esmeralda County.

| Location | mi | km | Destinations | Notes |
|---|---|---|---|---|
| Gold Point | 7.455 | 11.998 | Gold Street / 3rd Street | |
| | 0.000 | 0.000 | SR 266 to US 95 – Lida | |
1.000 mi = 1.609 km; 1.000 km = 0.621 mi
