= Gold Point, Nevada =

Ghost town in Esmeralda County, Nevada, US

- Ghost town
- Gold Point Historical Marker

- Location in Nevada Gold Point (the United States)
- Coordinates: 37°21′17″N 117°21′54″W
- Country: United States
- State: Nevada
- County: Esmeralda
- Settled: 1868

Population (2010)
  - Total: 7
  - Estimate (2018): 7
- Time zone: UTC-8 (Pacific (PST))
  - Summer (DST): UTC-7 (PDT)

Gold Point is an unincorporated community in Esmeralda County, Nevada. The community was named after the local gold-mining industry. Gold Point is the southern terminus of Nevada State Route 774.

== History ==
The area that would become Gold Point was first settled by ranchers and a few miners during the 1880s. The small camp of Lime Point was formed a few hundred yards west of the present town, at an outcropping of limestone.

When new discoveries of gold and silver established the major mining towns of Tonopah and Goldfield, Nevada in the early 1900s, a flood of prospectors returned to Lime Point. In 1902, silver was discovered in the area, and the old camp was revived and renamed Hornsilver (an informal name for the silver mineral chlorargyrite). Scarcity of water in the area required that the ore be shipped to nearby Lida for milling. The nearest major supply town was about 250 miles (400 km) north at Unionville, a mining town northeast of present-day Lovelock. The miners did not find silver in abundance, the costs of shipping the ore to Lida became too high, and, within a year, the settlement was abandoned.

In 1905, the Great Western Mine Company began operations about a one-half mile (0.8 km) southeast of Hornsilver and discovered a rich silver vein which brought a stampede of miners back to the camp. In addition to the rich silver ore, gold was also mined in small quantities. By 1908, the tent homes turned into more permanent wooden structures and the camp became a town.

In May 1908, the Hornsilver Herald began publication and the following week a post office was established. Before long the residents organized a chamber of commerce and numerous businesses sprouted up, including as many as 13 saloons. The chamber sought a railroad extension to Hornsilver, but this never happened. The nearest railroad depot was at Ralston, about 15 miles (24 km) east of Hornsilver. As deep ore bodies were extensively developed, the town peaked at a population of around 1,000 with over 225 wood-framed buildings, tents and shacks throughout the camp.

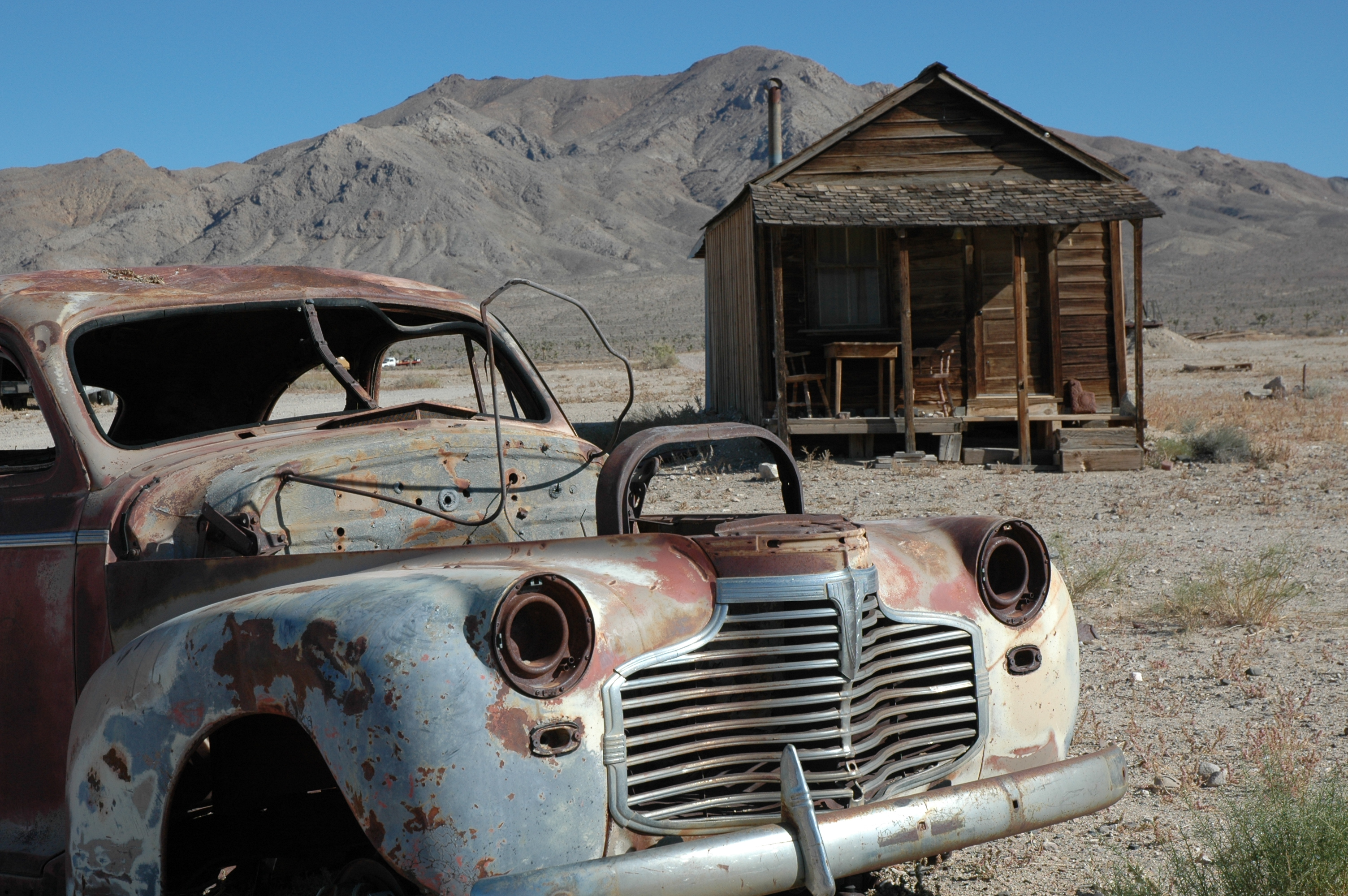
Gold Point - abandoned building and car, October 2009

The town's original founders did not find the boomtown they had hoped for, as this strike also proved to be short-lived. In 1909, litigation due to claim jumping brought many of the area mining properties into the courts. These many lawsuits, along with inefficient and costly milling practices, halted the town's growth just a little more than a year after it was established. Before long, most of its businesses closed and its residents again moved on.

But Hornsilver was not yet a ghost town, as mining operations resumed again in 1915. However, it must not have done very well as Charles Stoneham, of the New York Giants baseball team, purchased the Great Western mine in 1922 at a receiver's sale.

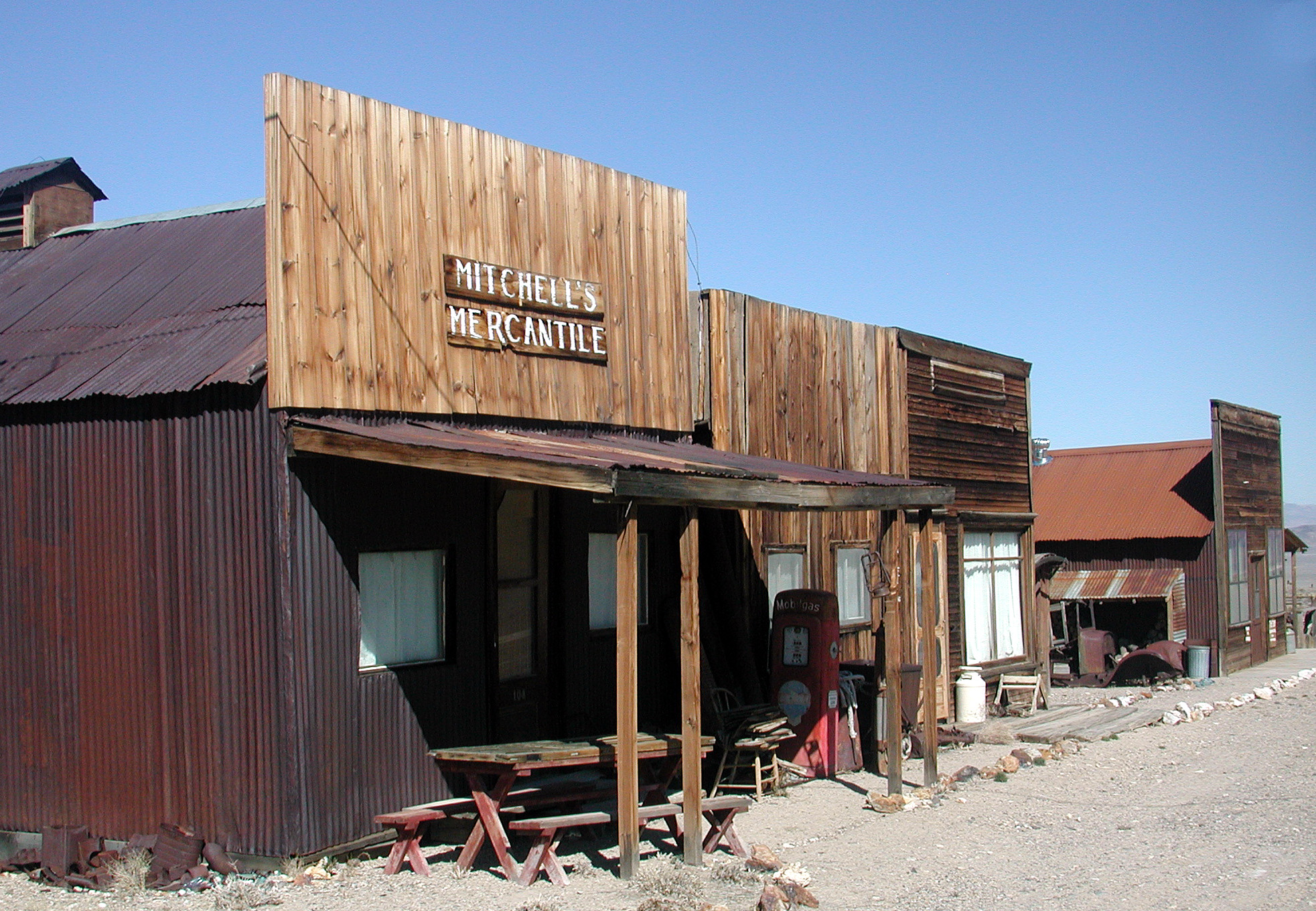
Buildings in the center of town in 2009

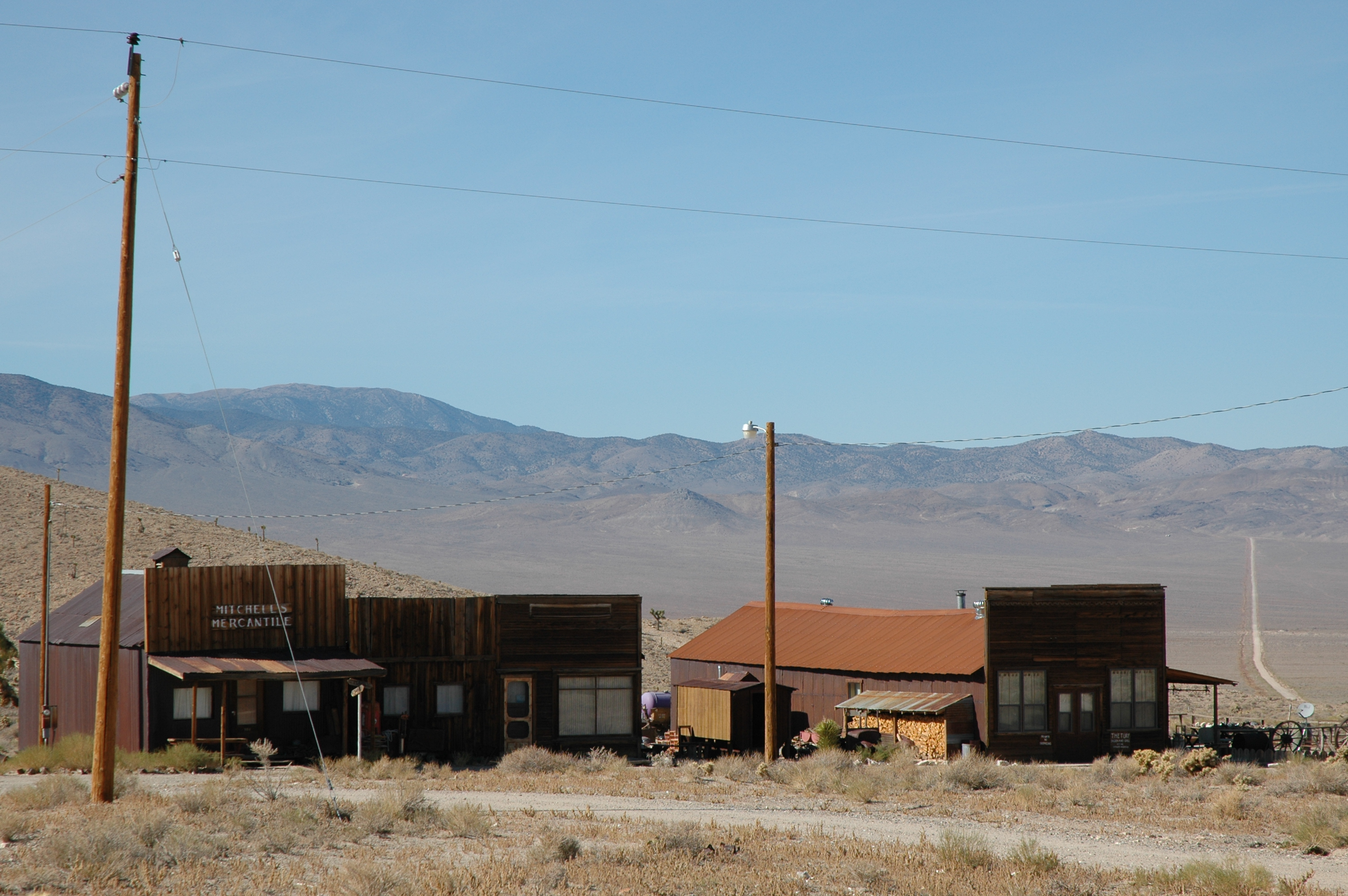
View of the ghost town showing its isolation

In 1927, a miner by the name of J.W. Dunfee went down the mine and made an even better discovery – gold. Within a few years, more gold than silver was being mined and the town's name was changed to Gold Point. It was after this discovery that Gold Point enjoyed its longest period of success, at a time that the rest of America was suffering from depression.

However, when World War II began, the government ordered all gold mines to shut down as nonessential to the war effort. Mining at Gold Point stopped, and once again most of its residents drifted away or went off to war.

The population was 20 in 1940.

After the war, mining resumed on a smaller scale and continued until the 1960s when a cave-in occurred from a dynamite blast at the Dunfee Shaft. More expensive to fix than the quantity and value of ore extracted would pay, the mine closed. Other than a few small leases and diggings, this was the last serious mining operation at Gold Point.

The old camp is a living history lesson with about 50 buildings still standing, including former Senator Harry Wiley's home and the post office that now serves as a museum. The Post Office Museum is open on most weekends and for large parties. Memorial Day Weekend is the annual Chili Cook-Off with prizes and drawings, food and drink, games and live music all day and through the night. For a few days of the year, the population soars to 400, but is usually seven. Gold Point is home to the High Desert Drifters Western Historical Society; the club routinely performs western reenactment and gunfights in the plaza. Guest services are available year-round, including electric hook-ups for RVs.

Nearby nature sites include waterfalls and watering holes frequented by wild horses and burros, Indian petroglyphs, fossils, petrified woods, and a view of Death Valley National Park from Big Molly.

== Demographics ==
Historical population
Census	Pop.	Note	%±
1910	50		—
1920	18		−64.0%
1930	35		94.4%
1940	110		214.3%
1950	23		−79.1%
1960	28		21.7%
2000	10		—
2010	7		−30.0%
2018 (est.)	7		0.0%
U.S. Census

== Neighboring cities and towns ==
- Goldfield
- Dyer
- Silver Peak

== See also ==
- List of ghost towns in Nevada
