= U.S. Route 6 in Nevada =

Section of U.S. Highway in Nevada, United States

U.S. Route 6
- Grand Army of the Republic Highway; Theodore Roosevelt Highway
- US 6 highlighted in red

Route information
- Maintained by NDOT
- Length: 305.723 mi (492.013 km)
- Existed: 1937–present

Major junctions
- West end: US 6 at the California state line near Benton, CA
- US 95 in Coaldale and Tonopah; US 50 / US 93 in Ely; US 93 in Majors Place
- East end: US 6 / US 50 at the Utah state line near Baker

Location
- Country: United States
- State: Nevada
- Counties: Mineral, Esmeralda, Nye, White Pine

Highway system
- United States Numbered Highway System; List; Special; Divided; Nevada State Highway System; Interstate; US; State; Pre‑1976; Scenic
← SR 895	→ I-11

U.S. Route 6 (US 6) is a United States Numbered Highway, stretching from Bishop, California in the west to Provincetown, Massachusetts on the East Coast. The Nevada portion crosses the center of the state, serving the cities of Tonopah and Ely, en route to Utah and points further east. Like US 50 to the north, large desolate areas are traversed by the route, with few or no signs of civilization, and the highway crosses several large desert valleys separated by numerous mountain ranges towering over the valley floors in what is known as the Basin and Range Province of the Great Basin.

US 6 has a diverse route through the state, traversing desert, desert mountain ranges and valleys, ghost towns, and Great Basin National Park. The entire highway in Nevada is designated as part of the Grand Army of the Republic Highway and has also been named the Theodore Roosevelt Highway, after the 26th U.S. president. Although US 50 to the north is known as "The Loneliest Road in America", US 6 can be considered as equally deserving of that title due to it serving equally desolate areas.

The route was routed entirely over existing state highways when it was extended into Nevada in 1937; however, all the concurrent state routes were eventually removed. The route has remained largely unchanged, except where it was realigned to enter Utah north of Baker instead of passing through the town.

== Route description ==
From the California border, US 6 heads northeast through semidesert Queen Valley with Boundary Peak, Nevada's highest summit, and Montgomery Peak in California on the right. These twin peaks are the northernmost high summits of the White Mountains, both over 13,000 feet (4,000 m). The highway then climbs into pinyon–juniper woodland and crosses Montgomery Pass 7,167 feet (2,185 m).

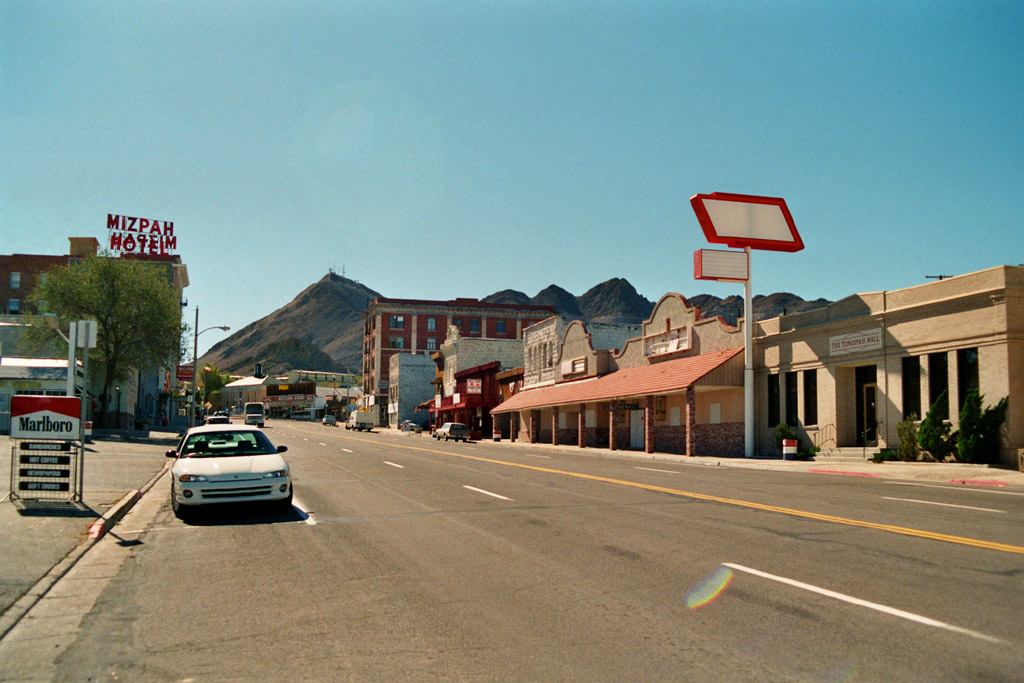
US 6/US 95 in Tonopah

From the pass, US 6 descends into barren shadscale desert, passing Columbus Marsh on the left, then merging with US 95 from Coaldale to Tonopah. The Nevada Test and Training Range begins about 15 miles (24 km) southeast of Tonopah.

Just east of Tonopah, US 6 continues east across a series of desert mountain ranges and valleys, including the Monitor Range. At Warm Springs, State Route 375 (SR 375), also known as the "Extraterrestrial Highway", departs to the southeast and US 6 assumes a northeasterly alignment across the Reveille, Pancake, Grant, and White Pine ranges. Rainfall increases eastward, so valleys become less barren and peaks over 11,500 feet (3,500 m) add scenic interest. The stretch on US 6 between Tonopah and Ely is the longest signed distance between gas stations with 168 miles (270 km).

Ely is the largest town on US 6 in Nevada. US 50 joins US 6 at Ely. East of Ely, US 6 and US 50 cross the Schell Creek Range, known for verdant forests and meadows and for a large mule deer and elk population. The highway descends to Spring Valley, then crosses the Snake Range at Sacramento Pass, north of Nevada's second-highest mountain, Wheeler Peak, where a branch road accesses Great Basin National Park. Beyond the pass, US 6 passes just north of Baker, a Mormon farming community and reaches the Utah state line.

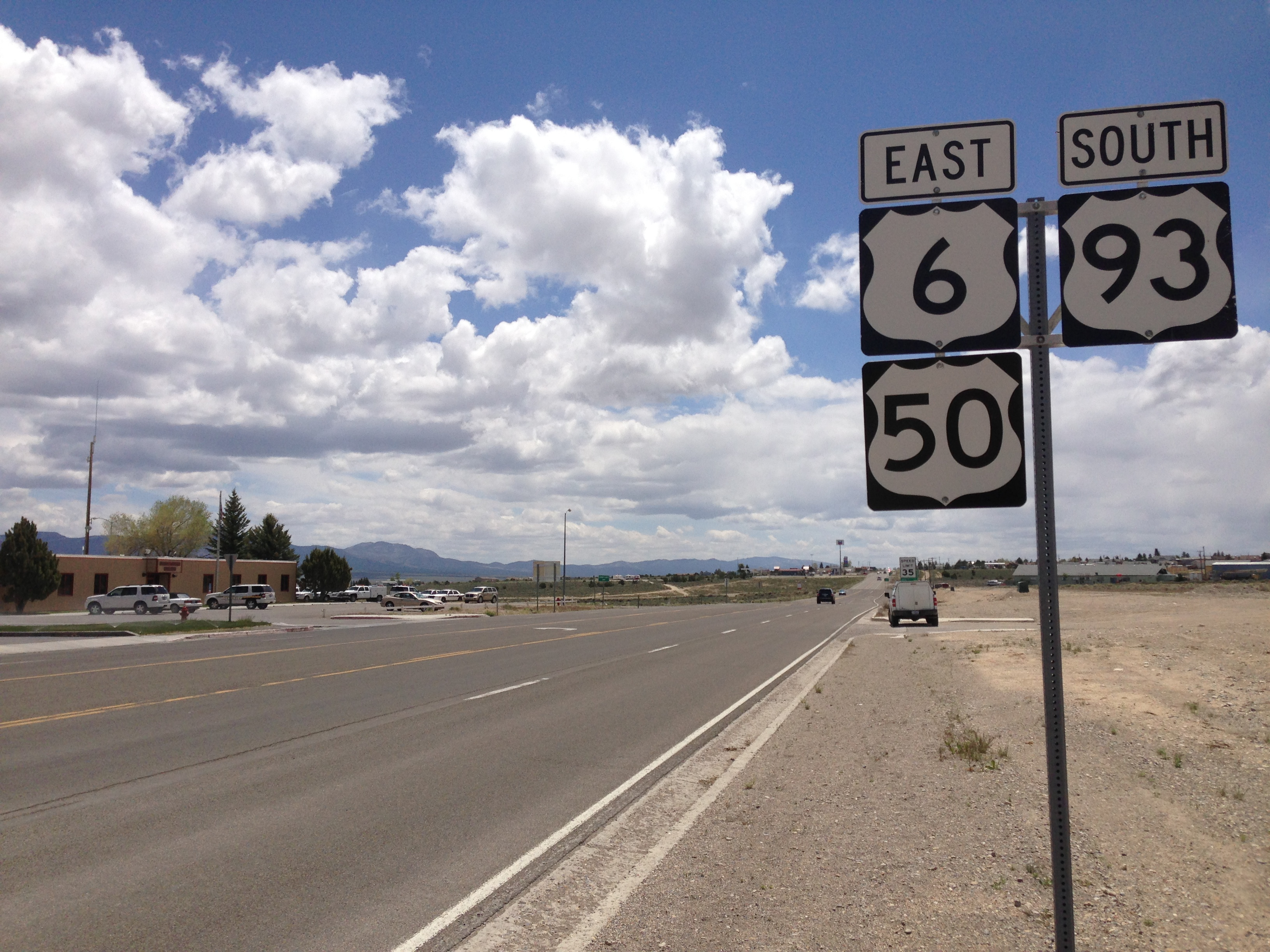
US 6/US 50/US 93 concurrency in Ely

There are no services anywhere between Tonopah and Ely (a distance of about 168 miles [270 km]). Although US 50 has the nickname "The Loneliest Road in America", US 6 has a solid case for the title; as Tonopah and Ely are the only cities it goes through in the 306 miles (492 km) it traverses in Nevada, with a combined population of just over 6,500. In contrast, US 50 boasts Stateline and the rest of the South Lake Tahoe area in Nevada, Carson City, and Fallon, along with other smaller communities. In addition, there is not much traffic for US 6, as it ends 38 miles (61 km) south of the California and Nevada state line in the small town of Bishop, California, at US 395 (with connections to the former western terminus of US 6 in Long Beach). The most heavily traveled portion of US 6 is the portion that is concurrent with US 95, as the latter route connects Las Vegas and Reno, the two largest metropolitan areas in Nevada.

== History ==
State Route 15
- Existed: 1929–1976

US 6 was one of the original U.S. Routes in the 1925 Bureau of Public Roads plan. It was commissioned in 1926 but was not extended west into Nevada until 1937. The alignment of US 6 in Nevada has remained largely unchanged since then.

US 6 was routed entirely over existing state highways in Nevada. Between the California state line west of Montgomery Pass to Basalt, the highway was concurrently routed with SR 10. From Basalt to Coaldale, the highway was concurrently routed with SR 15. From Coaldale to Tonopah, the highway was concurrently routed with SR 3. From Tonopah to Ely, the highway was concurrently routed with SR 4 (also called the Midland Trail). From Ely to present-day Majors Place, the highway was concurrently routed with US 93 and SR 7. From Majors Place to the Utah state line southeast of Baker, the highway was concurrently routed with SR 14.

All the concurrent state routes were removed from US 6 by 1939 except for SR 3 between Coaldale and Tonopah. Also, US 6 was realigned to enter Utah north of Baker instead of passing through the town. In 1940, SR 3 was replaced by US 95 between Coaldale and Tonopah. In 1954, US 50 was realigned between Ely and the Utah border and was concurrently routed over US 6.

== Major intersections ==
Mileposts in Nevada reset at county lines; the start and end mileposts for each county are given in the county column.

County	Location	mi	km	Destinations	Notes
Mineral; MI 0.00–15.20		0.00	0.00	US 6 west – Bishop	Continuation into California
Mineral; MI 0.00–15.20	Basalt			SR 360 north (Mina–Basalt Cutoff Road) – Hawthorne	
Esmeralda; ES 0.00–57.74 (Note: 57.700 per NDOT January 2018; may not yet be reflected on signage.)				SR 264 south (Dicalite Cutoff) – Fish Lake Valley, Dyer	
Esmeralda; ES 0.00–57.74				SR 773 south (Fish Lake Valley Road) – Fish Lake Valley, Dyer	
Esmeralda; ES 0.00–57.74	Coaldale			Future I-11 north / US 95 north (Veterans Memorial Highway) – Hawthorne, Reno	Proposed interchange; western end of US 95 concurrency
Esmeralda; ES 0.00–57.74	Blair Junction			SR 265 south (Silver Peak Road) – Silver Peak	Proposed interchange as part of I-11 extension
Nye; NY 0.00–132.02 (Note: 131.191 per NDOT January 2018; may not yet be reflected on signage.)	Tonopah	1.80	2.90	US 95 south (Veterans Memorial Highway) – Beatty, Las Vegas	Eastern end of US 95 concurrency
Nye; NY 0.00–132.02				SR 376 north (Tonopah–Austin Road) – Austin	
Nye; NY 0.00–132.02	Warm Springs			SR 375 south (Extraterrestrial Highway) – Rachel	
Nye; NY 0.00–132.02	Currant			SR 379 north (Duckwater Road) – Duckwater	
White Pine; WP 0.00–101.88 (Note: 101.331 per NDOT January 2018; may not yet be reflected on signage.)		13.92	22.40	SR 318 south – Lund, Las Vegas	
White Pine; WP 0.00–101.88	Ely	37.96	61.09	US 50 west / US 93 north – Ely, Carson City, Twin Falls	Western end of US 50/US 93 concurrency
White Pine; WP 0.00–101.88		46.05	74.11	Old SR 486 south	Serves Cave Lake State Park; MP is approximate, based on distance from MP 46.00
White Pine; WP 0.00–101.88	Majors Place	65.4	105.3	US 93 south – Pioche, Las Vegas	Eastern end of US 93 concurrency; MP is approximate, based on distance to SR-893 below
White Pine; WP 0.00–101.88		66.80	107.50	SR 893 north (Spring Valley Road) – Spring Valley	
White Pine; WP 0.00–101.88		93	150	SR 487 south (Baker Road) – Baker	Serves Great Basin National Park; MP is approximate, based on NDOT map
White Pine; WP 0.00–101.88		101.88	163.96	US 6 east / US 50 east – Delta	Continuation into Utah
1.000 mi = 1.609 km; 1.000 km = 0.621 mi: Concurrency terminus

== See also ==
U.S. Route 6
Previous state: California	Nevada	Next state: Utah
