= Nevada State Route 487 =

Highway in Nevada

State Route 487
- Baker Road
- SR 487 highlighted in red

Route information
- Maintained by NDOT
- Length: 11.009 mi (17.717 km)
- Existed: 1976–present
- History: Established as SR 73 by 1937

Major junctions
- South end: SR-21 at the Utah state line near Garrison, UT
- North end: US 6 / US 50

Location
- Country: United States
- State: Nevada
- County: White Pine

Highway system
- Nevada State Highway System; Interstate; US; State; Pre‑1976; Scenic
← SR 447	→ SR 488

State Route 487 (SR 487) is a north–south state highway in White Pine County, Nevada. The route follows Baker Road from the Utah–Nevada state line southeast of Baker to U.S. Route 6 and U.S. Route 50 (US 6 and US 50). The route was previously known as State Route 73 prior to 1976. SR 487 is designated as a Nevada Scenic Byway.

== Route description ==
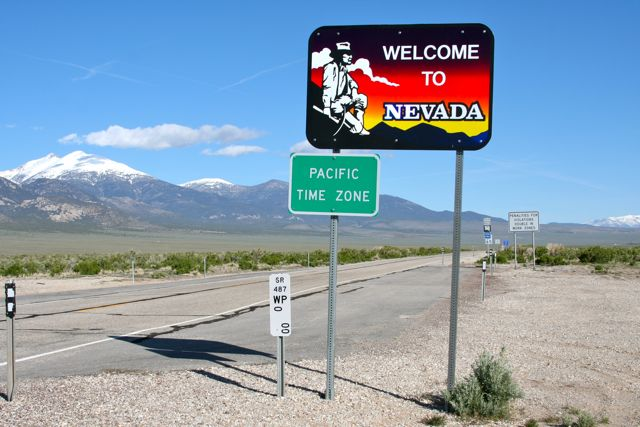
SR 487 at the Utah state line

SR 487 begins at the Utah state line northwest of Garrison, Utah as the continuation of Utah State Route 21, which serves the towns of Milford and Beaver. From there, the route heads northwesterly on Baker Road through the desert terrain. The highway comes upon the town of Baker, near which there are pockets of farmland. In Baker, the route intersects Lehman Caves Road (SR 488), which is the gateway to Great Basin National Park. Leaving the town, SR 487 continues northwesterly through more desert lands. The route ends at the intersection of US 6/US 50, approximately seven miles (11 km) west of the Nevada–Utah state line.

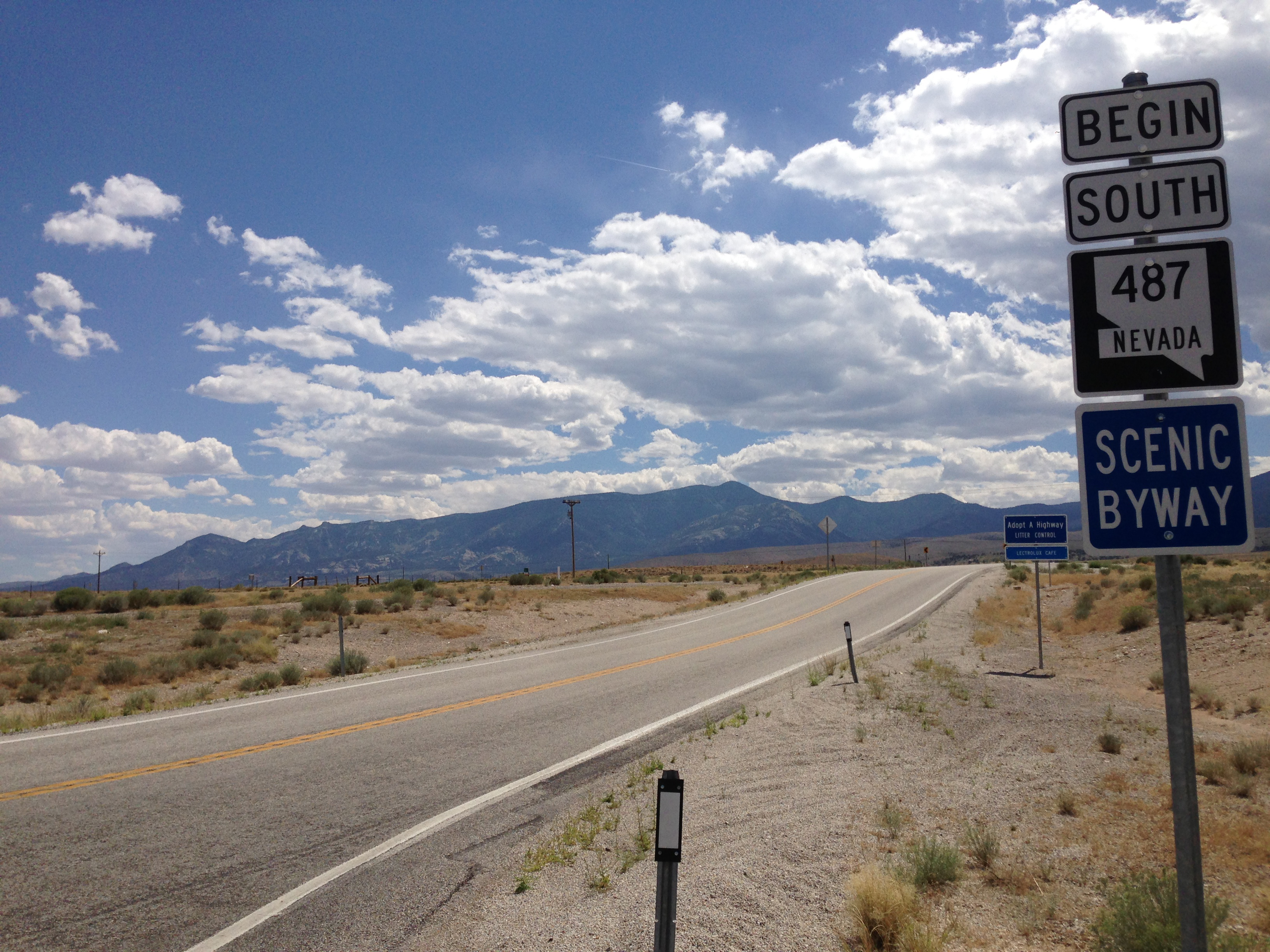
First reassurance sign along southbound SR 487

== History ==
Baker Road first appears on official Nevada state highway maps as far back as 1937. Although the state's tourist maps did not show Baker Road carrying the State Route 73 designation until 1942, other state maps show the route number existing on the highway by 1937. The route was upgraded to a gravel road by 1948, and was fully paved by 1949.

SR 73 was eliminated from the state highway system as part of a mass renumbering of Nevada's state routes. The State Route 487 designation was assigned to the former alignment of SR 73 on July 1, 1976. The resulting change in the highway number was first seen on the 1978–79 edition of the official highway map. Since its re-designation as SR 487, there has not been any major changes to Baker Road.

The Nevada Department of Transportation designated State Route 487 as a Nevada Scenic Byway on March 27, 2000, simultaneously with SR 488 and the portion of US 6/US 50 near the highway's northern terminus.

== Major intersections ==
The entire route is in White Pine County.

Location	mi	km	Destinations	Notes
	0.00	0.00	SR-21 – Milford	Continuation beyond southern terminus into Utah
Baker	5.49	8.84	SR 488 (Lehman Caves Road)	serves Great Basin National Park
	11.01	17.72	US 6 / US 50 – Ely, Delta	Northern terminus
1.000 mi = 1.609 km; 1.000 km = 0.621 mi
