= Fish Lake Valley, Nevada =

Ghost town in Nevada and California, U.S.

Coordinates: 37°41′40.88″N 118°04′41.91″W

Fish Lake Valley is a ghost town located in the geographic Fish Lake Valley, within Esmeralda County, Nevada, and Inyo County, California.

It is just east of the White Mountains, the highest range entirely within the Great Basin at 14,252 feet (4,344 m). There is sufficient rain and snow at high elevations to feed permanent streams from the mountains, providing irrigation for alfalfa and other crops, although the valley's elevation, in excess of 4,000 feet (1,200 m), is a serious constraint.

== History ==
Fish Lake Valley was originally settled in 1866, when the 'Palmetto Mining District' in Esmeralda County was formed, and settlement in Fish Lake Valley began. During the 1870s two companies, 'Griffing & Nyman's' and 'Pacific Borax Works' were located here extracting borax at Fish Lake.

The Carson and Columbus Stage Line ran north from Fish Lake Valley to Aurora and Carson City, also connecting with Logsprings, Nevada, in the Sylvania Mining District as well as Lida in the Sylvania Mountains. Local ranches supplied food to the freight industry and mining communities such as Fish Lake Valley.

A post office opened in Fish Lake Valley in 1881.

Today a historical marker near the site commemorates the life of W.O. Harrell, known as "Harrell, the Irrepressible, Citizen Extraordinaire", of Fish Lake Valley in the 1870s. A Wm. O. Harrell of Fish Lake Valley is listed as registering a cattle ear mark in 1874.
