= Nevada State Route 490 =

Highway in Nevada

State Route 490
- Ely Prison Road
- SR 490 highlighted in red

Route information
- Maintained by NDOT
- Length: 8.931 mi (14.373 km)

Major junctions
- West end: Ely State Prison entrance
- East end: US 93 near Ely

Location
- Country: United States
- State: Nevada
- County: White Pine

Highway system
- Nevada State Highway System; Interstate; US; State; Pre‑1976; Scenic
| ← SR 488 | → SR 535 |

State Route 490 (SR 490) is a state highway in White Pine County, Nevada. The route serves a state prison north of Ely.

== Route description ==
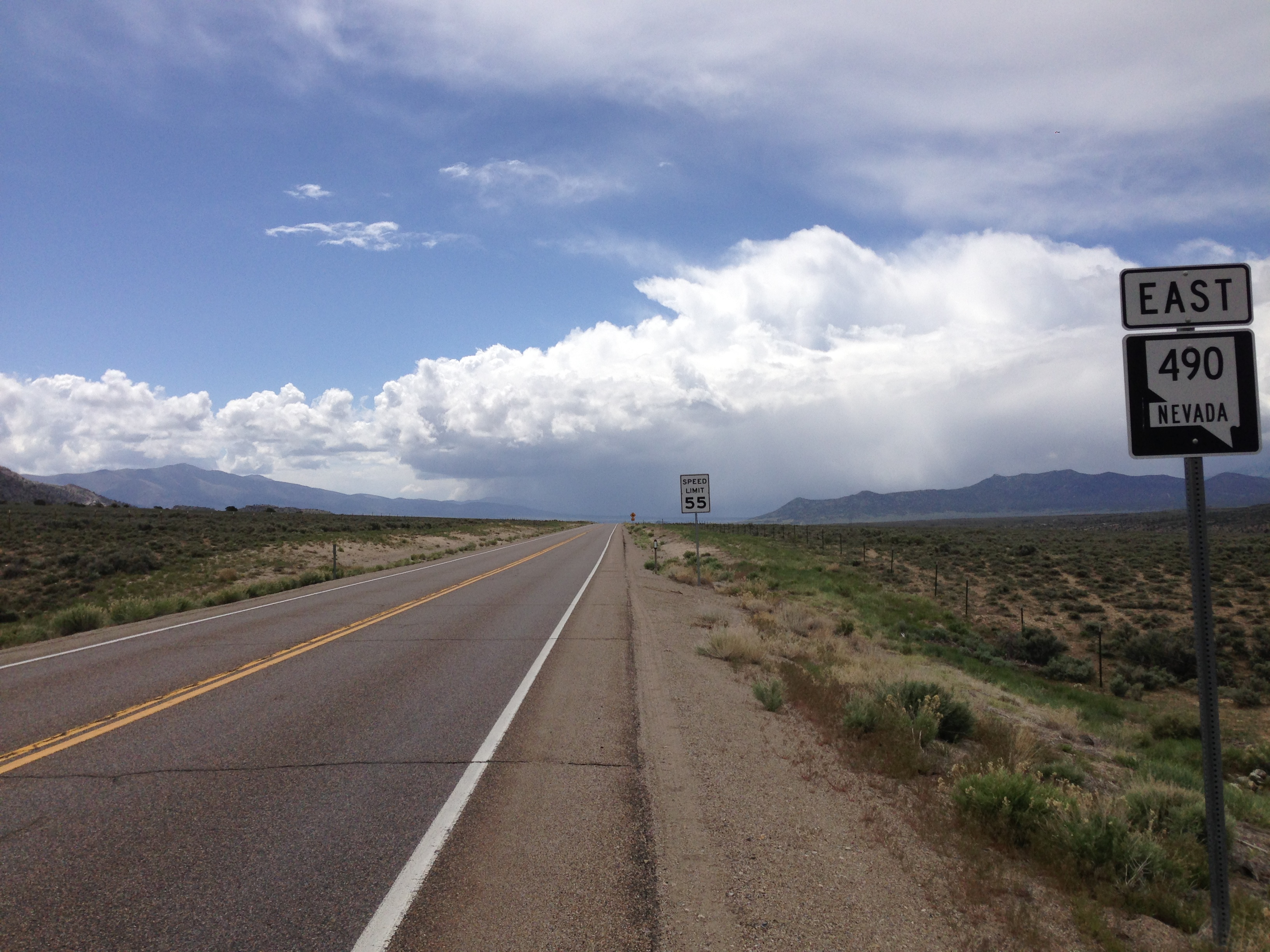
View east along SR 490 from its western terminus near Ely State Prison

The route begins at the entrance to the Ely State Prison, a maximum-security penitentiary north of Ely. From there, the route follows Lackawanna Road in a southeasterly direction through desert terrain for nearly 3 miles (4.8 km). SR 490 then cuts through a short mountain gap and turns nearly due south. After another 3 miles (4.8 km), the route turns easterly at a T-intersection. SR 490 then travels about 2 miles (3.2 km) further to the southeast to reach its terminus at a junction on U.S. Route 93 northeast of Ely and just south of the Ely Airport.

== History ==
SR 490 was added to the state highway system on January 17, 1992.

== Major intersections ==
The entire route is in White Pine County.

| Location | mi | km | Destinations | Notes |
|---|---|---|---|---|
| | 0.00 | 0.00 | Ely State Prison entrance | Western terminus |
| | 8.93 | 14.37 | US 93 – Ely, Wells | Eastern terminus |
1.000 mi = 1.609 km; 1.000 km = 0.621 mi
