= Baker Ranger Station =

- U.S. National Register of Historic Places
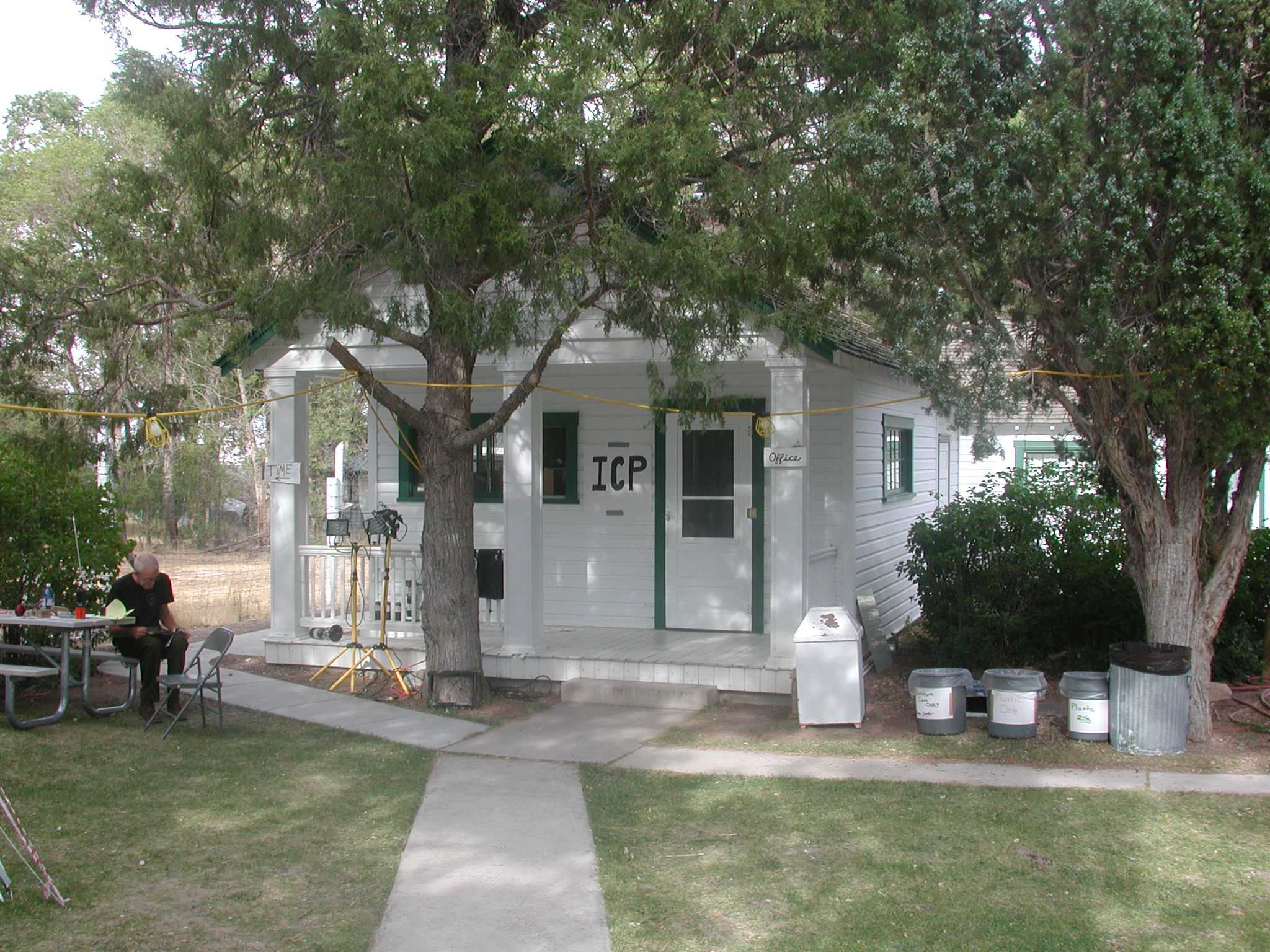
- Baker Ranger Station Office

- Location within Nevada Location within the United States
- Nearest city: Baker, Nevada
- Coordinates: 39°0′53″N 114°7′23″W
- Built: 1935
- Architect: USFS; CCC
- NRHP reference No.: 95001224
- Added to NRHP: October 17, 1995

Baker Ranger Station was established in 1911 at the edge of Baker, Nevada to administer U.S. government lands in White Pine County, Nevada. The original 80 acres (32 ha) plot was first known as the Baker Administrative Site, becoming a year-round ranger station in 1918 for the Baker Ranger District of Nevada National Forest. The compound became a guard station and work site with the division of Nevada National Forest into Humboldt and Toiyabe National Forests in 1957. In 1986 Great Basin National Park was established and the station was transferred to the National Park Service as an administrative center for the park.

== Description ==
The ranger station includes four wood-frame buildings dating to the 1930s as well as a variety of more recent structures. The first Baker Ranger Station was built in 1911, amounting to four rooms and regarded as unsightly. It was removed by the time new structures were built, beginning with a 1935 cottage, followed by an office, barn and garage-fire cache structure. The cottage was based on U.S. Forest Service Plan R-4, No. 23, the office on R-4, No. 4, and the barn R-4, No. 13B. The buildings were built by men on the local relief rolls. Other infrastructure items at the compound were built by Civilian Conservation Corps labor.

The complex was placed on the National Register of Historic Places in 1995.
