= Baker, Nevada =

- Census-designated place
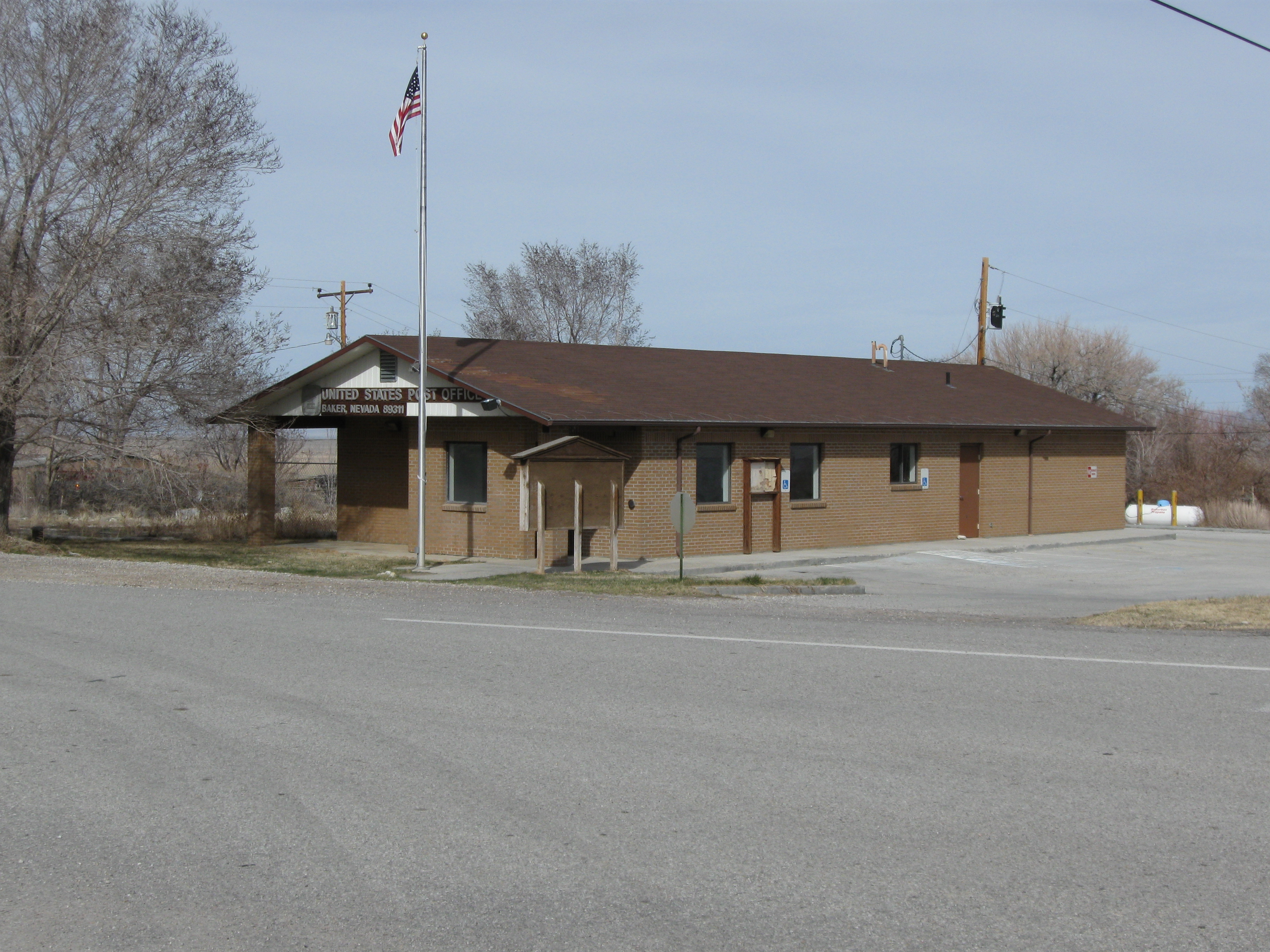
- Post Office in Baker, March 2010

- Location of Baker Baker (the United States)
- Coordinates: 39°00′52″N 114°07′35″W
- Country: United States
- State: Nevada
- County: White Pine

Area
  - Total: 0.91 sq mi (2.35 km^{2})
  - Land: 0.90 sq mi (2.34 km^{2})
  - Water: 0.0039 sq mi (0.01 km^{2})
- Elevation: 5,309 ft (1,618 m)

Population (2020)
  - Total: 41
  - Density: 45.4/sq mi (17.51/km^{2})
- Time zone: UTC−8 (Pacific (PST))
  - Summer (DST): UTC−7 (PDT)
- ZIP code: 89311
- Area code: 775
- FIPS code: 32-04100
- GNIS feature ID: 2629977

Baker is a census-designated place in southeastern White Pine County, Nevada, United States. It is located 5 miles (8.0 km) east of the main entrance of Great Basin National Park at the junction of State Routes 487 and 488. The town is named after an early settler, George W. Baker. As of the 2020 census, Baker had a population of 41.

Public education is provided through the White Pine County School District. Baker 3-6 Elementary school is the only school in Baker.

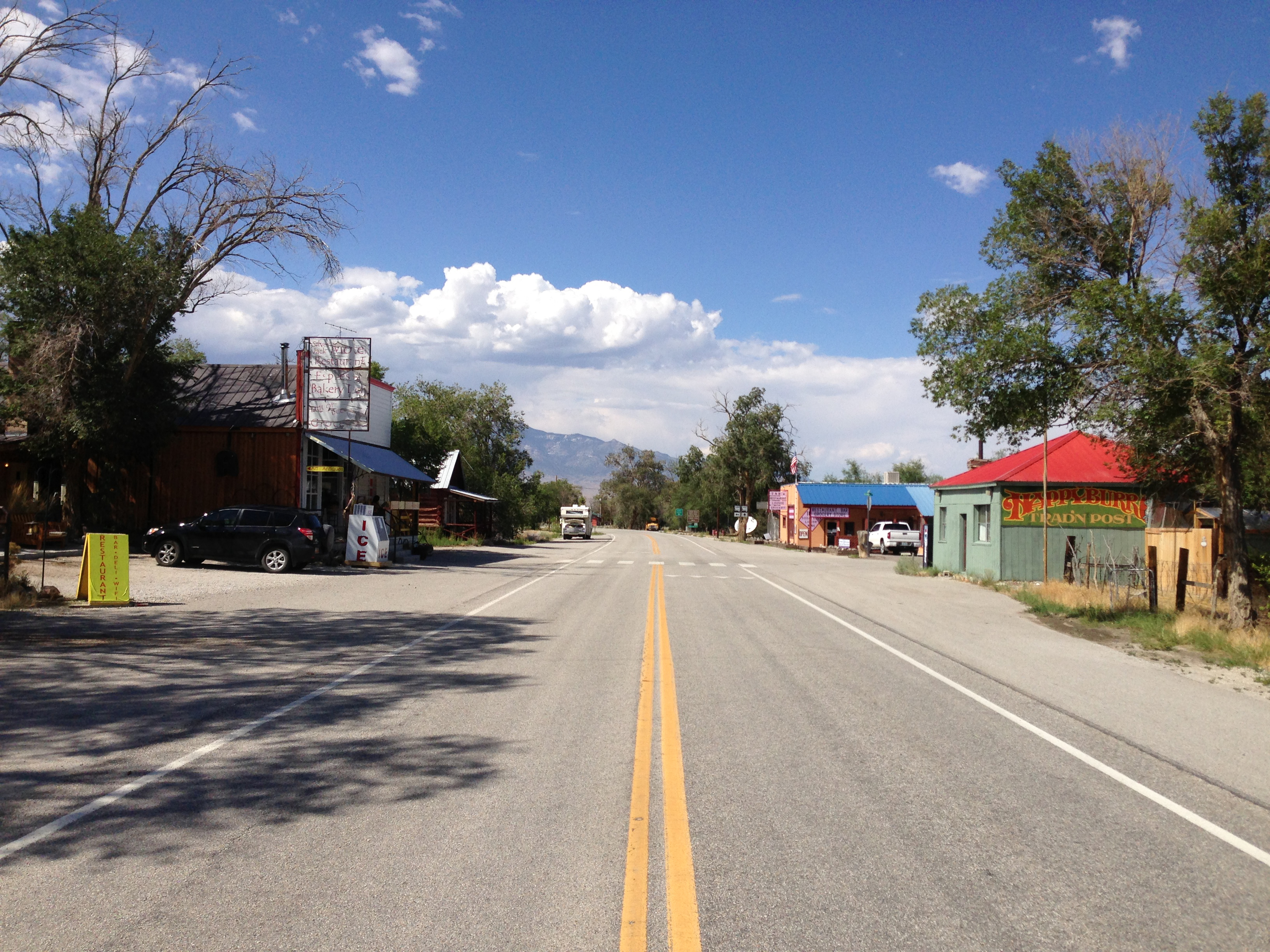
Main Street (State Route 487) in Baker, August 2014

== Notable people ==
Prominent people from Baker include Calvin Quate, a professor of electrical engineering at Stanford University who is famous for the invention of the atomic force microscope.

== In popular culture ==
In January 1997, Late Show with David Letterman produced a segment on the town, with the show's Biff Henderson touring the area and ending his narrative on Baker with the quote, "It's quiet, peaceful, beautiful and the people are friendly."

== See also ==
- List of census-designated places in Nevada
- Baker Ranger Station
