= Fish Lake Valley =

Valley in southwest Nevada, U.S.

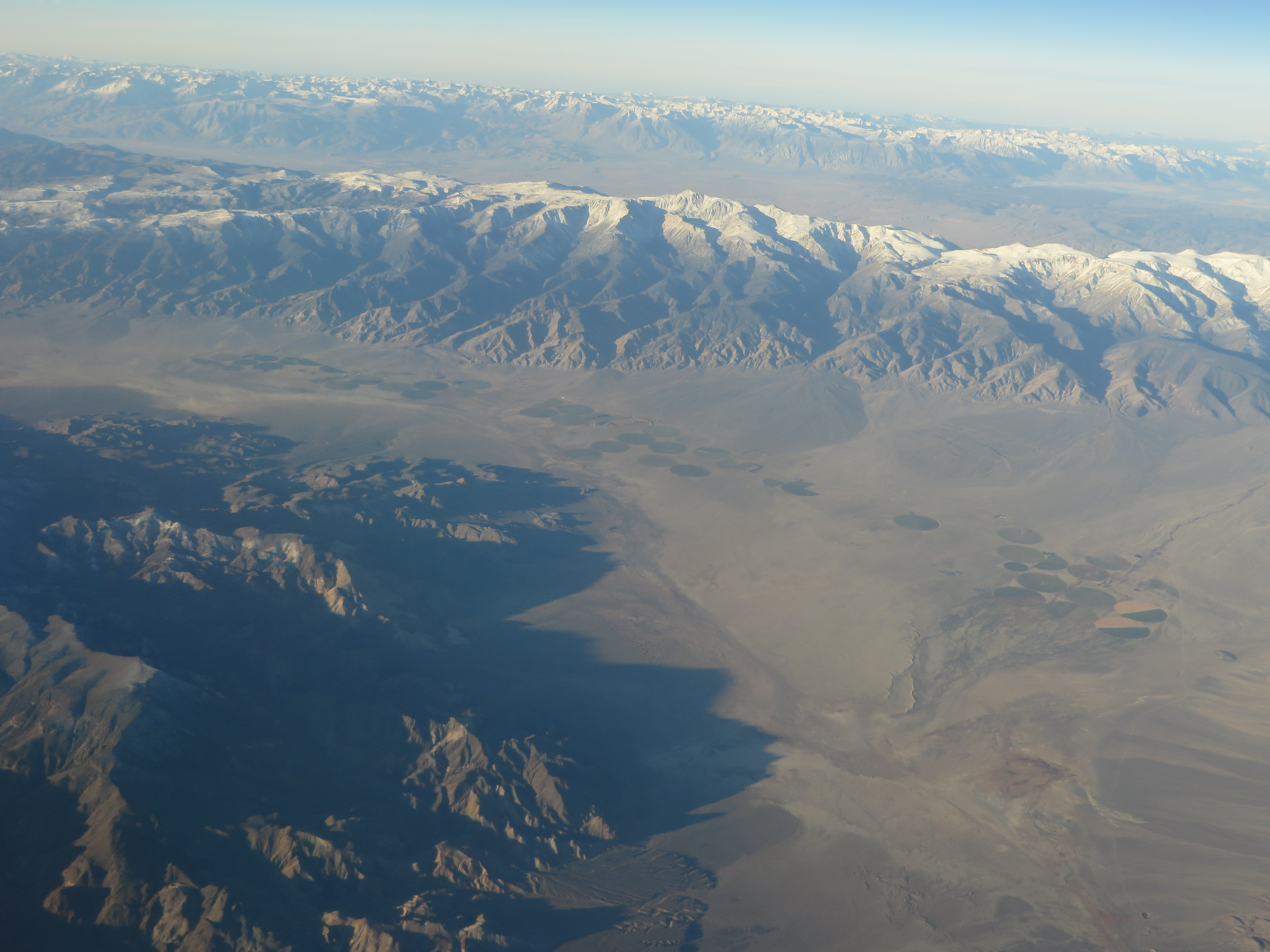
- Aerial image

- Location within Nevada
- Length: 25 miles (40 km)
- Width: 8 miles (13 km)

Geography
- Location: United States, Esmeralda County, Nevada, Mono and Inyo Counties, California
- Borders on: White Mountains-W, SW & S Silver Peak Range-E & SE; Monte Cristo Range-NE; Nev Rte 773 & Excelsior Mountains-NW
- Coordinates: 37°41′40.88″N 118°04′41.91″W
- Interactive map of Fish Lake Valley

The Fish Lake Valley is a 25 miles (40 km) long endorheic valley in southwest Nevada, one of many contiguous inward-draining basins collectively called the Great Basin. The alluvial valley lies just northwest of Death Valley and borders the southeast, and central-northeast flank of the massif of the White Mountains of California. The southwestern portion of the valley lies in California, with the southern tip at the edge of Inyo County east of the Chocolate Mountains, and a significant portion of the south end of the valley floor including the ranching community of Oasis, in Mono County. The valley is sparsely populated, primarily with ranchers and indigenous Paiute. The valley's Post Office and commercial services are located in the town of Dyer.

== Description ==
Fish Lake Valley is a slightly southwest–northeast trending valley, in its northern and central section. It borders the White Mountains on the southwest and receives water from Cottonwood Creek and other small, permanent mountain streams. The extension of the mountains southeasterly provides a feeder valley with some small dry lakes and salt pans. The major section of the valley contains a borax mixed salt pan for 10 mi (16 km) of the valley. A small dry lake is in the center, approximately 1.5 mi (2.4 km) long. It is fed from the White Mountains, and the small subvalley southeastwards. Alluvial fans are west of the dry lake, with Nevada State Route 264 in the hills to the northwest that also feed southeast and eastwards. To the east and southeast, the Silver Peak Range borders the valley with no alluvial fans, and is the smaller massif probably block faulted from the White Mountains, and thru block faulting creating the smaller feeder valley on the White Mountains' southeast, (the Furnace Creek Fault Zone).

The center-north of the valley has very narrow fans, and broken salt flats, that end at the valley's central dry lake. Lower elevation hills and peaks at the north of the Silver Peak Range are the east and northeast border. Coaldale, Nevada on east–west U.S. Route 6 in Nevada is located at the northern border of the Fish Lake Valley.

== Route access ==
Nevada State Route 264 enters the valley's center west at the foothills of the White Mountains and at Dyer turns southeast at the feeder valley and foothills of the mountains; its terminus point is Oasis, Mono County, California. Nevada State Route 773 intercepts Route 264 in the hills on the Fish Lake Valley northwest border. U.S. Route 6 at Coaldale, Nevada, is in the hills adjacent the valley's north border.

== See also ==
- Furnace Creek Fault Zone
- Great Basin
- Fish Lake Hot Well
