= Lida, Nevada =

- Ghost town
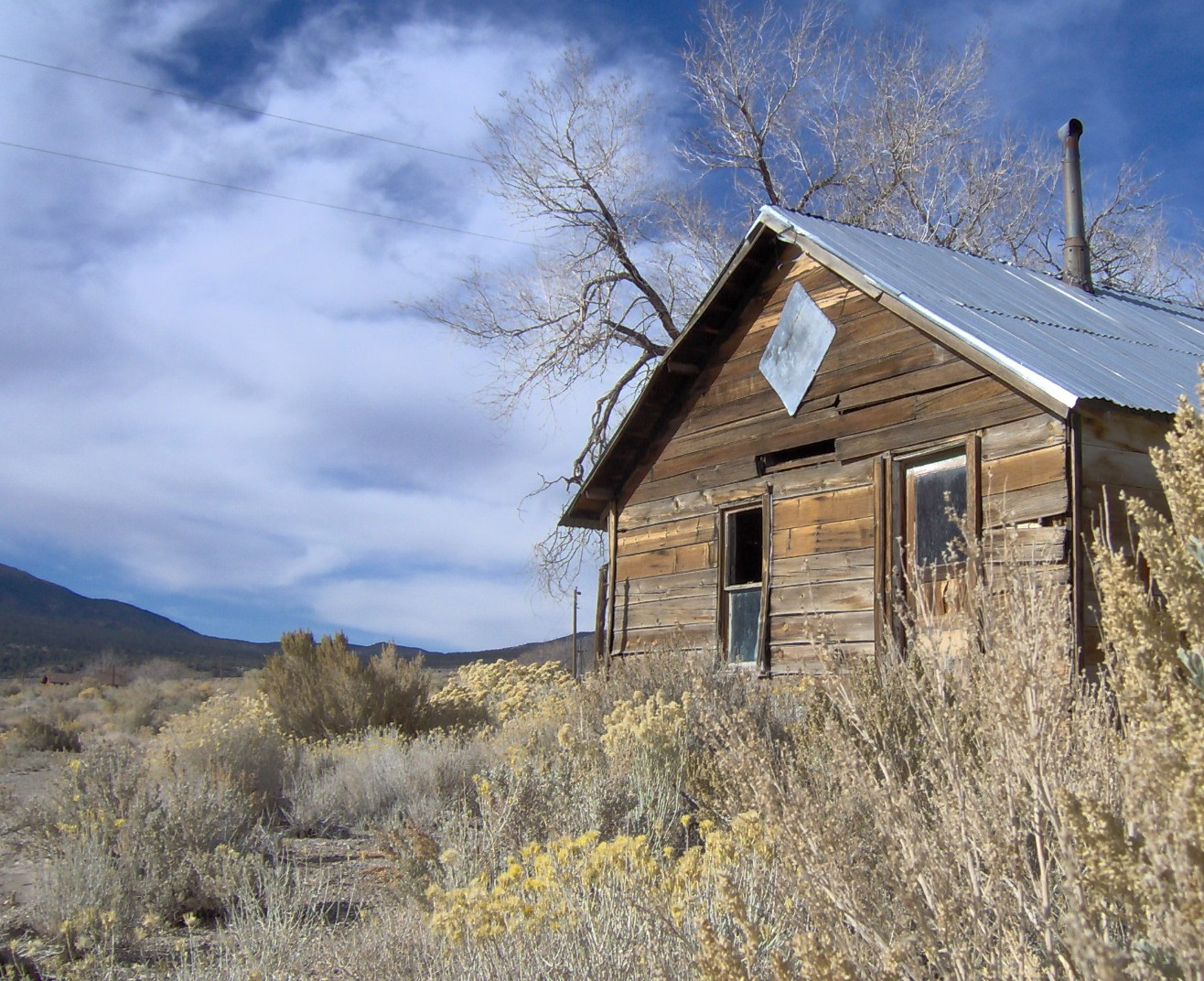
- Abandoned house in Lida

- Location within the state of Nevada Lida (the United States)
- Coordinates: 37°27′30″N 117°29′53″W
- Country: United States
- State: Nevada
- County: Esmeralda
- Time zone: UTC-8 (Pacific (PST))
  - Summer (DST): UTC-7 (PDT)

Nevada Historical Marker
- Reference no.: 157

Lida, Nevada is a small ghost town in Esmeralda County, Nevada, near the border with California. The GNIS classifies it as a populated place. It is located on State Route 266, north of Magruder Mountain.

The first white settlers at Lida arrived in 1867. The town was named for the wife of prospector David Buel of nearby Austin. It is located on the site of a former Shoshone and Northern Paiute camp.

The first wave of settlement was fueled by the discovery of silver reserves. But most mining activity ended by 1880 with the exhaustion of local ore. Another boom came in 1905, driven by gold found in nearby Goldfield, bringing Lida's population to a peak of around 300. But the boom only lasted two years.

A third, smaller jump in activity came shortly before World War I. In 1913, the Roosevelt Midland Trail, one of the first marked transcontinental auto trails in America, routed through Lida on the way to California. Both the Federal Aid Highway Act of 1921 and the Pershing Map of 1922 envisioned making the Lida route part of the growing national highway system. But when the United States Numbered Highway System was first set in 1926, Lida was nowhere to be found. Planners instead chose the Arrowhead Trail through Las Vegas to connect traffic to Southern California, redesignating it U.S. Route 91.

A post office was in operation at Lida between 1873 and 1932.

The population was 16 in 1940.

The site now rests on private property.

== Gallery ==
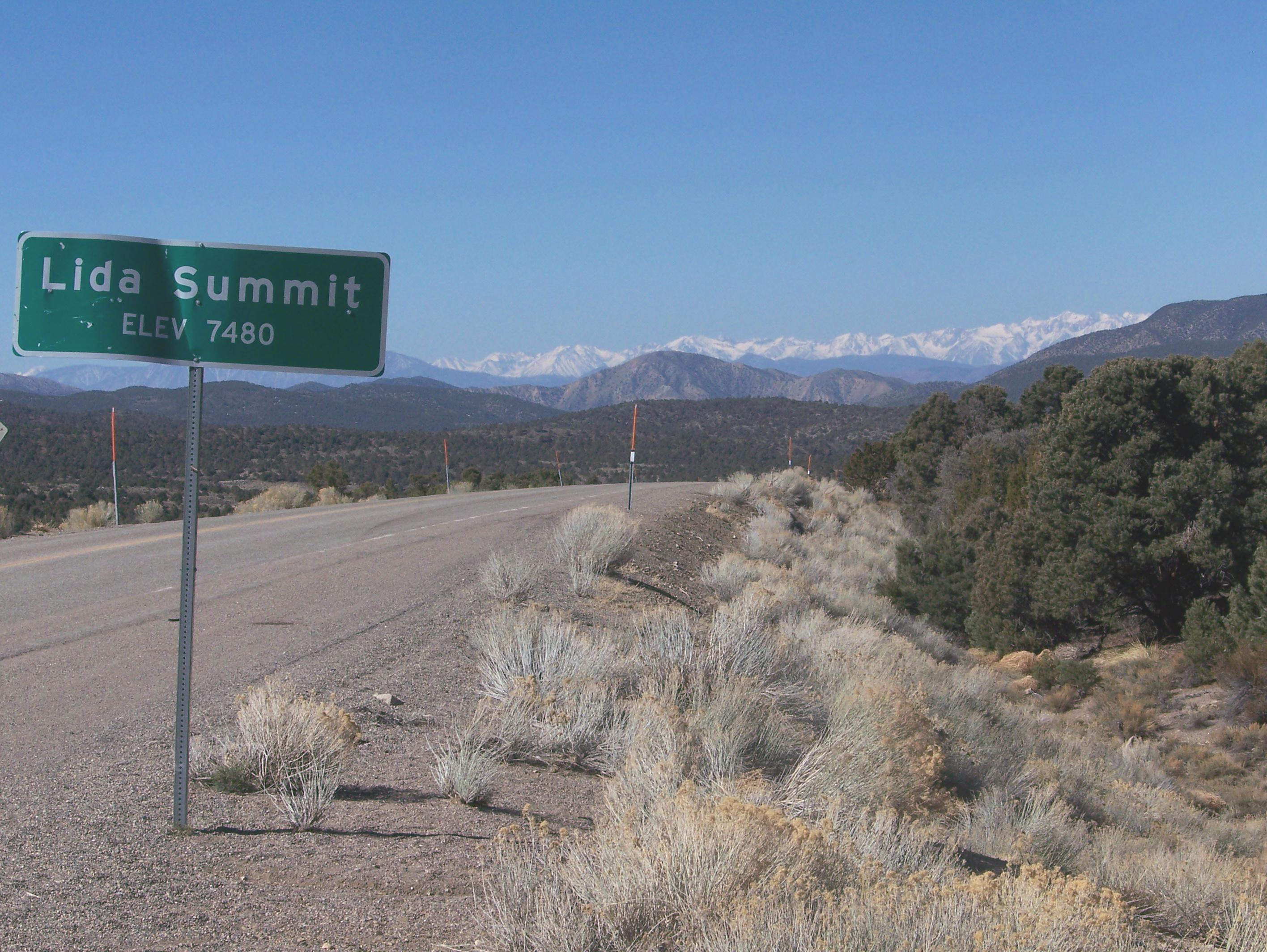
Lida Summit, looking west to the Sierra Nevada

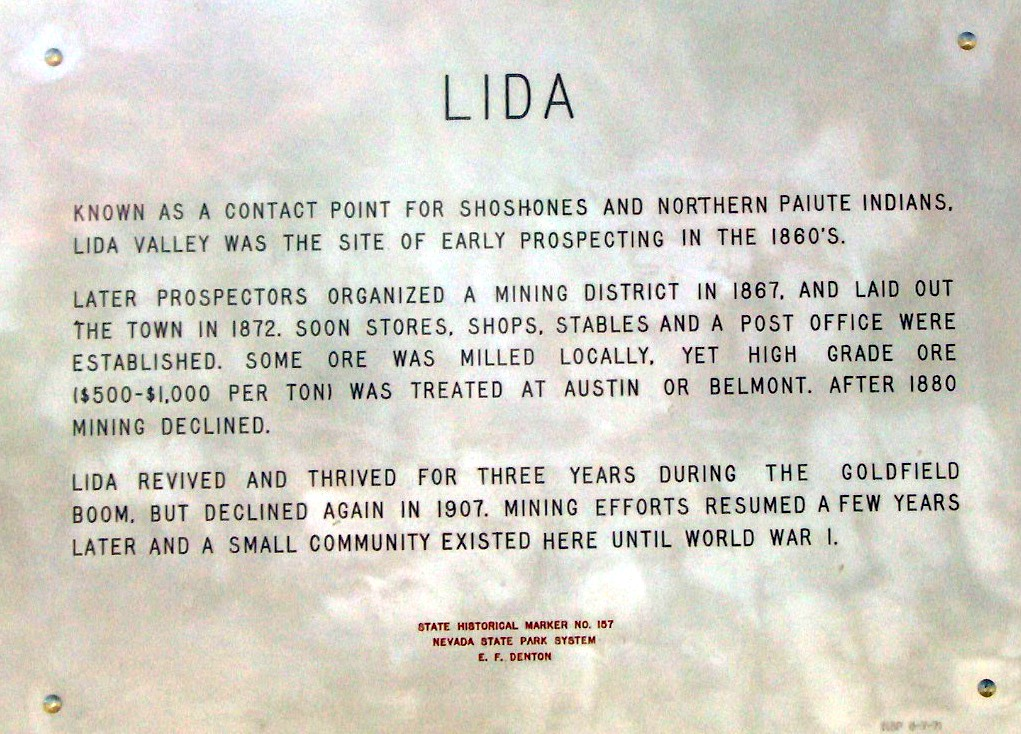
Historical plaque
