= Coaldale, Nevada =

Ghost town

Coordinates: 38°01′39″N 117°52′59″W

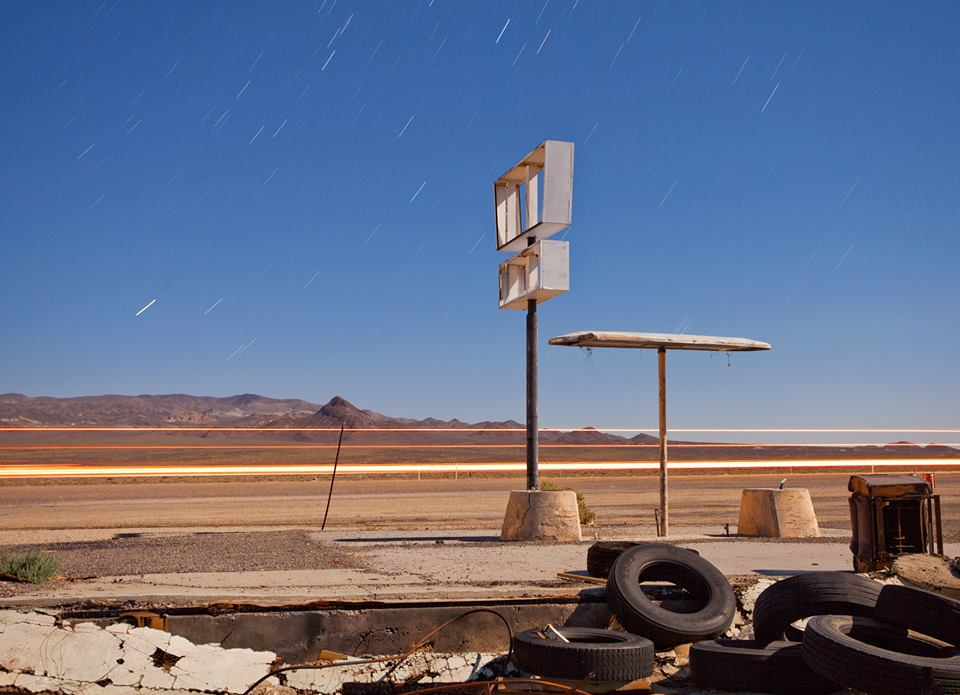
The ghost town of Coaldale

Coaldale is a former mining town and ghost town in Esmeralda County, Nevada, located at the junction of U.S. Route 6 and U.S. Route 95 about 40 miles (64 km) west of Tonopah.

== History ==
Coal was discovered near Coaldale in 1894 by William Groszenger who sold 150 tons to the Columbus Marsh Borax works. In 1911, the Darms Mine and the Nevada Coal and Fuel Co. mines were in operation. Coal was found 4 miles SSE of Coaldale in the north end of the Silver Peak Range.

In the early 1900s, there was renewed interest in the coal, when Dr. Frances Williams of Goldfield, Nevada personally restaked claims. At the time, Groezenger retained the majority of the claims.

In November, 1917, the Darms Mining Company asked the Nevada Railroads Commission to secure a rate of $3/ton to deliver coal from Coaldale to Reno. The Tonopah and Goldfield Railroad replied that while they had grave doubts about the value of the coal, they offered two plans: 1) where one or two cars would be transported to Tonopah, Goldfield and Reno and if the coal was usable, then a rate would be established for future shipments, or 2) a temporary rate of $6.35/ton would be used, which was the Reno to Coaldale rate. In February, 1918, Darms replied that the seam was too small to take advantage of either offer.

In the 1940s, Eldon and Jewel Parson operated a gas station near the Tonopah and Goldfield Railroad grade. They later moved their operation about 1 mile (1.6 km) to the junction with Highway 95. The restaurant and bar buildings were part of a hospital in Tonopah and trucked to Coaldale.

Coaldale had a store, cafe, motel and service station as late as 1993, but they are now abandoned, though still standing. Residences and other buildings have disappeared. The service station was closed down due to EPA testing in 1993 that found that its underground fuel tanks were leaking. Soon, the restaurant and motel closed, since the service station was the primary attraction for travelers. At some point before 2006, a fire destroyed the restaurant.

== Trivia ==
In 1994, the movie The Stranger was filmed at Coaldale. The Stranger features Kathy Long, female kickboxing champion, who battles bikers and saves the town.

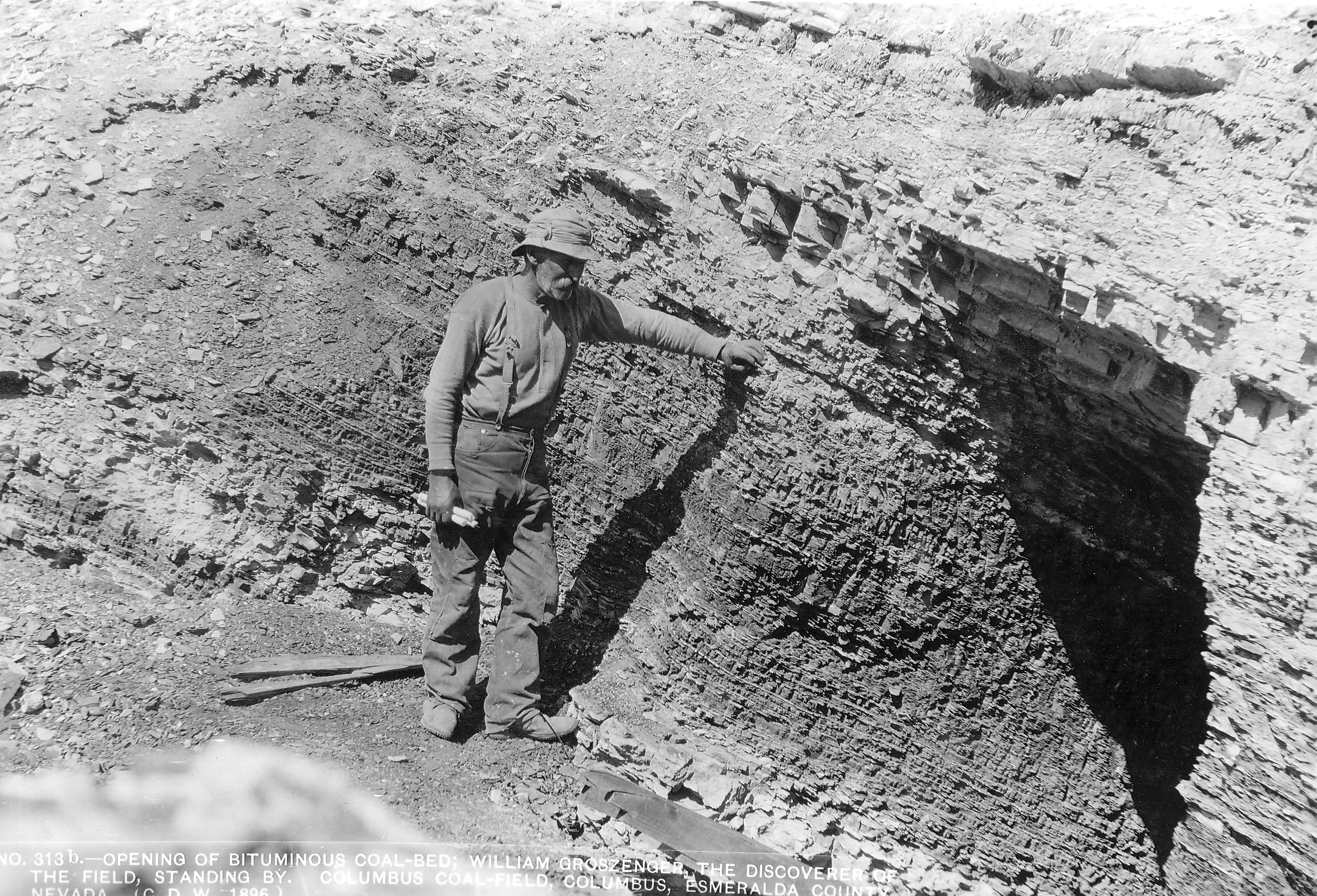
Opening of bituminous coal bed. William Groszenger, the discoverer of the field. He is standing by the Columbus coal field, Columbus, Esmeralda County, Nevada. 1896. Note that there is a similar picture in Spurr, "Ore Deposits of the Silver Peak Quadrangle, Nevada," v. 55 USGS, at Groszenger's name is also spelled Groezinger in other sources

== See also ==
- List of ghost towns in Nevada
