= Dyer, Nevada =

- Census-designated place
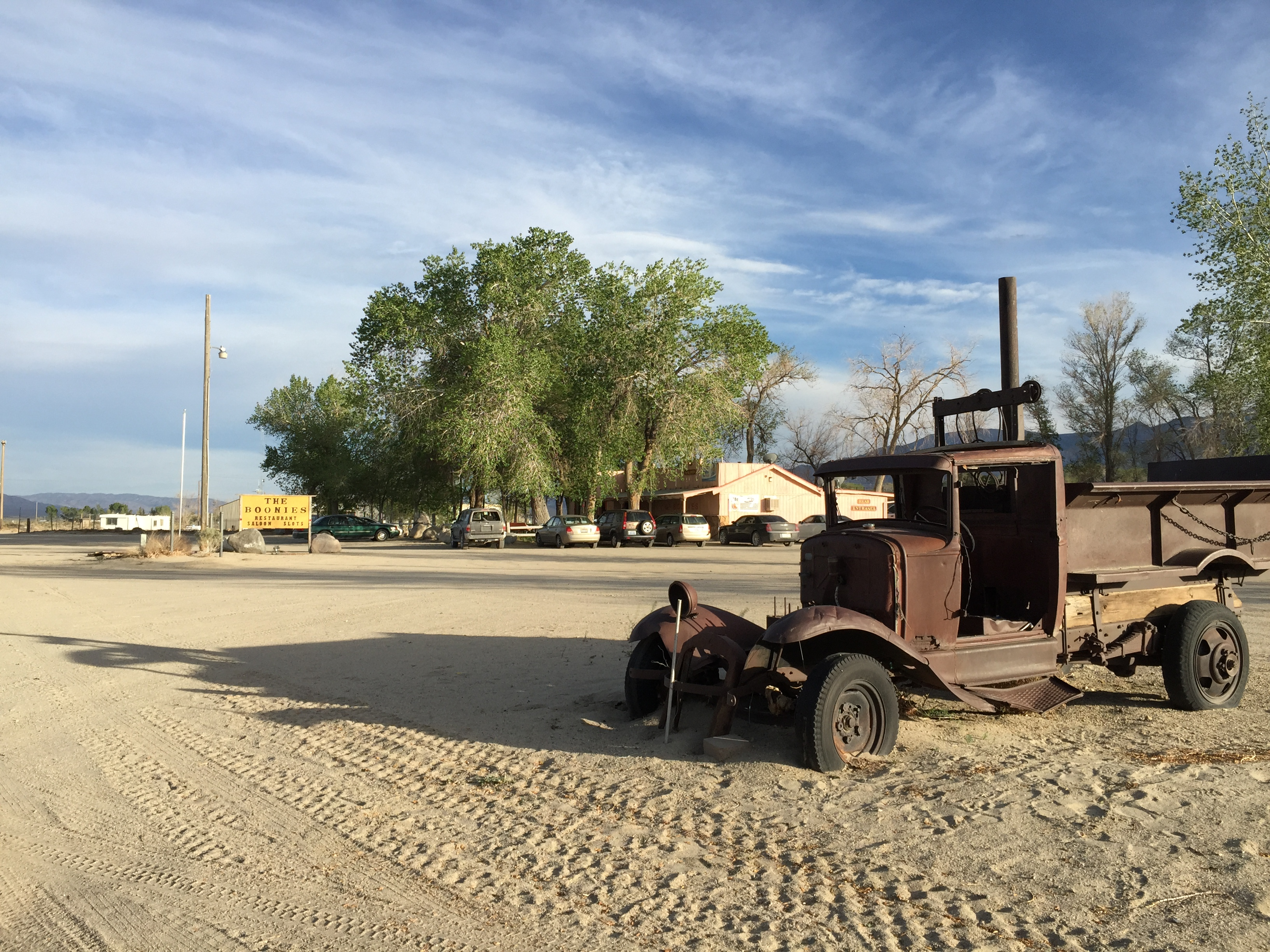

- Location within the state of Nevada
- Coordinates: 37°40′03″N 118°03′59″W
- Country: United States
- State: Nevada
- County: Esmeralda

Area
  - Total: 35.23 sq mi (91.25 km^{2})
  - Land: 35.14 sq mi (91.01 km^{2})
  - Water: 0.089 sq mi (0.23 km^{2})
- Elevation: 4,880 ft (1,490 m)

Population (2020)
  - Total: 232
  - Density: 6.6/sq mi (2.55/km^{2})
- Time zone: UTC-8 (Pacific (PST))
  - Summer (DST): UTC-7 (PDT)
- ZIP code: 89010
- FIPS code: 32-20700
- GNIS feature ID: 859604

Dyer is a census-designated place located in Fish Lake Valley, Esmeralda County, Nevada, United States. It had a population of 232 as of the 2020 census.

Dyer is located on State Route 264, near Nevada's border with California. It is 25 miles (40 km) south of U.S. Route 6 and 15 miles (24 km) north of Oasis, California.

== Demographics ==
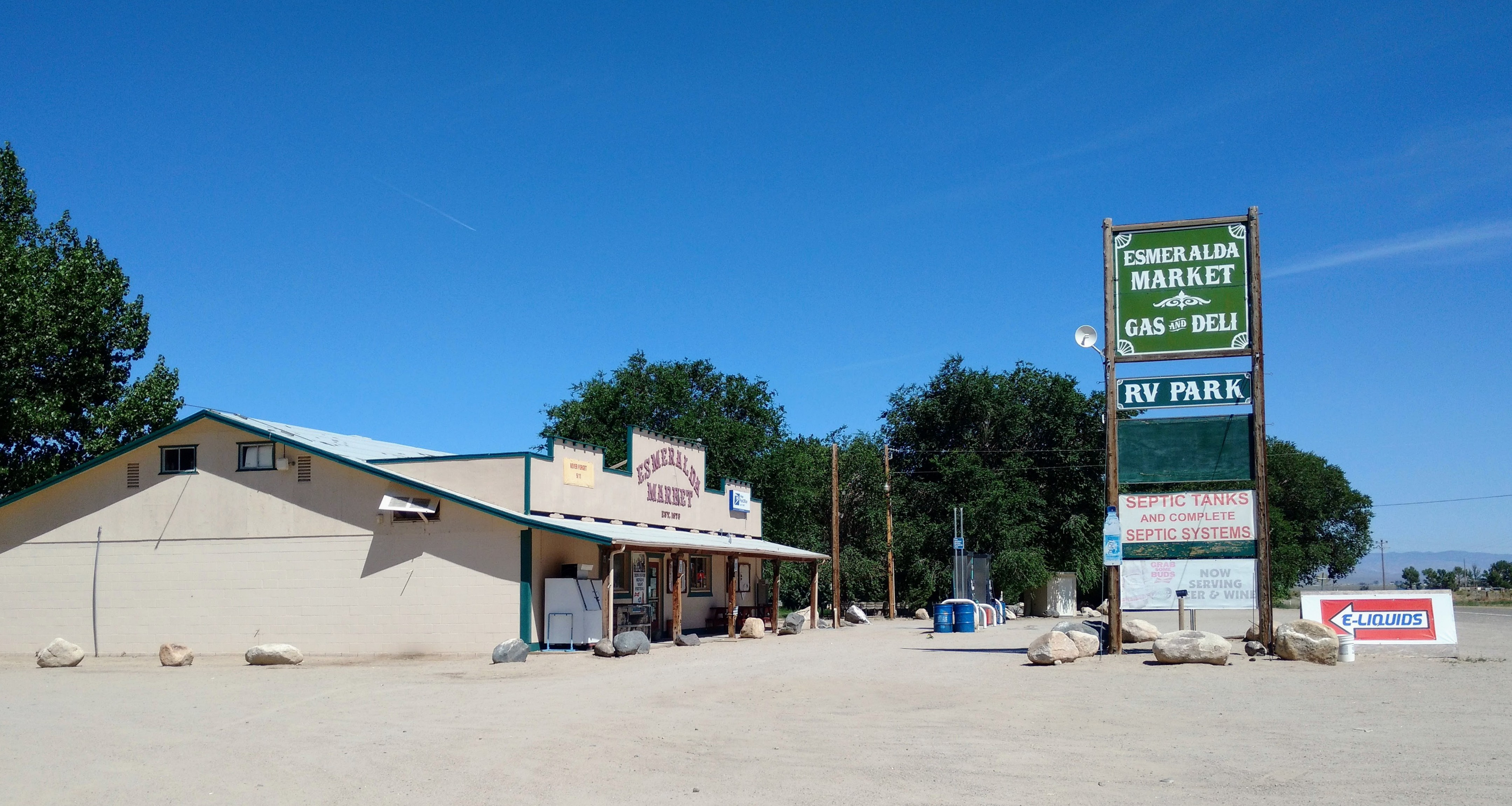
Esmeralda Market in 2016.

Historical population
| Census | Pop. | Note | %± |
|---|---|---|---|
| 2010 | 259 | | — |
| 2020 | 232 | | −10.4% |
U.S. Decennial Census

== History ==
The post office at Dyer has been in operation since 1889. The community took its name from nearby Dyer's Ranch.

== Education ==
Residents are zoned to the Esmeralda County School District for grades K-8.

High school students in the entire county go to Tonopah High School of Nye County School District.

The county is in the service area of Great Basin College.

== Climate ==
The Köppen climate classification classifies the weather in Dyer as a cool arid climate, abbreviated BWk. This climate type occurs primarily in mid-latitude rain shadow regions located eastward from high mountains.

Climate data for Dyer, Nevada
| Month | Jan | Feb | Mar | Apr | May | Jun | Jul | Aug | Sep | Oct | Nov | Dec | Year |
|---|---|---|---|---|---|---|---|---|---|---|---|---|---|
| Mean daily maximum °F (°C) | 46 (8) | 52 (11) | 59 (15) | 67 (19) | 76 (24) | 86 (30) | 93 (34) | 91 (33) | 83 (28) | 71 (22) | 57 (14) | 47 (8) | 69 (21) |
| Mean daily minimum °F (°C) | 16 (−9) | 22 (−6) | 26 (−3) | 31 (−1) | 39 (4) | 47 (8) | 53 (12) | 51 (11) | 43 (6) | 32 (0) | 22 (−6) | 15 (−9) | 33 (1) |
| Average precipitation inches (mm) | 0.5 (13) | 0.5 (13) | 0.4 (10) | 0.5 (13) | 0.5 (13) | 0.3 (7.6) | 0.4 (10) | 0.4 (10) | 0.4 (10) | 0.4 (10) | 0.4 (10) | 0.3 (7.6) | 5 (130) |
Source: Weatherbase
