= Oasis, Mono County, California =

Unincorporated community in California, United States

Coordinates: 37°29′16″N 117°54′56″W

Oasis is an unincorporated community in Mono County, California, United States. It is located in Fish Lake Valley, 20 miles (32 km) east-southeast of Mount Barcroft. Oasis is at the junction of California State Route 266 and California State Route 168. The 2000 Census reports that Oasis had a population of 22.

A post office operated at Oasis from 1873 to 1942.
