= Carson City (baseball) =

Carson City "Capitals"
- 1907; Carson City, Nevada

Minor league affiliations
- Class: Independent (1907)
- League: Nevada State League (1907)

Major league affiliations
- Team: None

Minor league titles
- League titles (0): None

Team data
- Name: Carson City (1907)
- Ballpark: Unknown (1907)

The Carson City team was a minor league baseball team based in Carson City, Nevada. In 1907, Carson City played the 1907 season as members of the Independent level Nevada State League. The Carson City team nickname was noted to be the "Capitals". The Capitols ended the season in second place in the four-team league.

The 1907 Carson City Capitals are the only minor league team hosted in Carson City to date.

== History ==
One of the earliest organized baseball clubs in the city was the 1870 Carson City Silver Star ballclub. Another ballclub of the early era was the 1874 Carson City Silver Stars.

In 1907, Carson City hosted minor league baseball wnen the "Capitals" became charter members of the Nevada State League, which began minor league play operating as an Independent four–team league. The Nevada State League president was John T. Powers, who later served as president of the Federal League. The 1907 Nevada State League formed with charter franchises in Carson City, Nevada, Goldfield, Nevada, Reno, Nevada and Tonopah, Nevada.

The Nevada State League had been structured with John T. Powers serving as league president and Bert Ulmer as treasurer. On July 6, 1907 a meeting was conducted at the office of Senator Boyd, where the Nevada State League Board of Directors was formed. The directors were Ben Rosenthal of Goldfield, Senator James T. Boyd of Reno, J.P Merder of Carson City and Thomas Kendall of Tonopah. Powers had previously served as president of the Wisconsin State League. Ulmer was an owner of the Elite Saloon in Goldfield. James T. Boyd was a member of the Nevada State Senate from 1906 to 1910. Rosenthal was Goldfield County commissioner. Kendall was a mining pioneer, owner of the Kendall Mine and a founder of Toonpah.

Research indicates the Carson City franchise was called the Carson City "Capitals". The other league members were noted to be called the Goldfield "Miners", Reno "Mudhens" and Tonopah "Mollycoddlers". Unofficial records place Carson City in second place with a 7–4–1 record, behind the first place Goldfield "Miners", who had a 9–5 record. They were followed by the Tonopah "Mollycoddlers" at 3–6 and the Reno "Mudhens" with a 3–7–1 record. It is noted that Reno disbanded on July 15, 1907 and it is possible the rest of the league, Carson City included, followed suit, as only three teams would have remained. Carson City, Nevada has not hosted another minor league team.

== Ballpark ==
The exact name and location of the Carson City ballpark in 1907 is unknown.

== Timeline ==
Year(s)	# Yrs.	Team	Level	League
1907	1	Carson City "Capitals"	Independent	Nevada State League

== Year–by–year record ==
Year	Record	Finish	Manager	Playoffs/Notes
1907	7–4–1	2nd	NA	No playoffs held

== Notable alumni ==
No roster information for Carson City in 1907 is known.
