= Nevada State League =

Defunct Minor League baseball league

- Classification: Independent (1907)
- Sport: Minor League Baseball
- Founder: John T. Powers
- First season: 1907
- Folded: 1907
- CEO: Bert Ulmer (1907)
- Director: Ben Rosenthal (1907); Senator James T. Boyd (1907); J.P Merder (1907); Thomas Kendall (1907)
- President: John T. Powers (1907)
- No. of teams: 9
- Country: United States of America
- Most titles: 1 Goldfield* (1907)

The Nevada State League was an independent level minor league baseball league that played in the 1907 season. The four–team Nevada State League consisted of teams based in Nevada. The Nevada State League played just the 1907 season before permanently folding. Notably, league president John T. Powers was scheduled to umpire a league game in Goldfield, Nevada during the season and took the field with revolvers strapped around his waist, before law enforcement intervened.

== History ==
A league also called the Nevada State League played as a semi–professional league with teams centered around mining towns in Nevada.

The Nevada State League began minor league play in the 1907 season, operating as an Independent league with classification from the National Commission, which oversaw minor league baseball. The 1907 Nevada State League formed as a four–team league with charter franchises in Carson City, Nevada, Goldfield, Nevada, Reno, Nevada and Tonopah, Nevada. The Nevada State League permanently folded after playing only the 1907 season. The official records and statistics of the Nevada State League are unknown.

John T. Powers served as league president and Bert Ulmer was the league treasurer. In a meeting held July 6, 1907 at the office of Senator Boyd, the board of directors of the Nevada State League was selected. The directors were Ben Rosenthal of Goldfield, Senator James T. Boyd of Reno, J.P Merder of Carson City and Thomas Kendall of Tonopah. Powers had previously served as president of the Wisconsin State League. Ulmer was an owner of the Elite Saloon in Goldfield. James T. Boyd was a member of the Nevada State Senate from 1906 to 1910. Rosenthal was Goldfield County commissioner. Kendall was a mining pioneer, owner of the Kendall Mine and a founder of Tonopah. During the same meeting, the Nevada State League scheduled games to be played July 13 and 14, 1907, with Goldfield playing at Tonopah and Reno playing at Carson.

On August 7, 1907, league president John T. Powers was scheduled to umpire a game in Goldfield, Nevada. Powers took the field with revolvers strapped around his waist. Powers was disarmed by the local sheriff before the game was allowed to go ahead.

== Nevada State League teams ==
Team name	City represented	Ballpark	Year
Carson City "Capitals"	Carson City, Nevada	Unknown	1907
Goldfield "Miners"	Goldfield, Nevada	Unknown	1907
Reno "Mudhens"	Reno, Nevada	Unknown	1907
Tonopah "Mollycoddlers"	Tonopah, Nevada	Unknown	1907

== 1907 Nevada State League overall standings ==
The official records of teams in the Nevada State League are unknown. Posted research reflects the following known standings and team names.

Team standings	W	L	T	PCT	GB	Manager
Goldfield "Miners"	9	5	0	.643	–	NA
Carson City "Capitals"	7	4	1	.636	1	NA
Tonopah "Mollycoddlers"	3	6	0	.333	3	NA
Reno "Mudhens"	3	7	1	.300	3½	NA

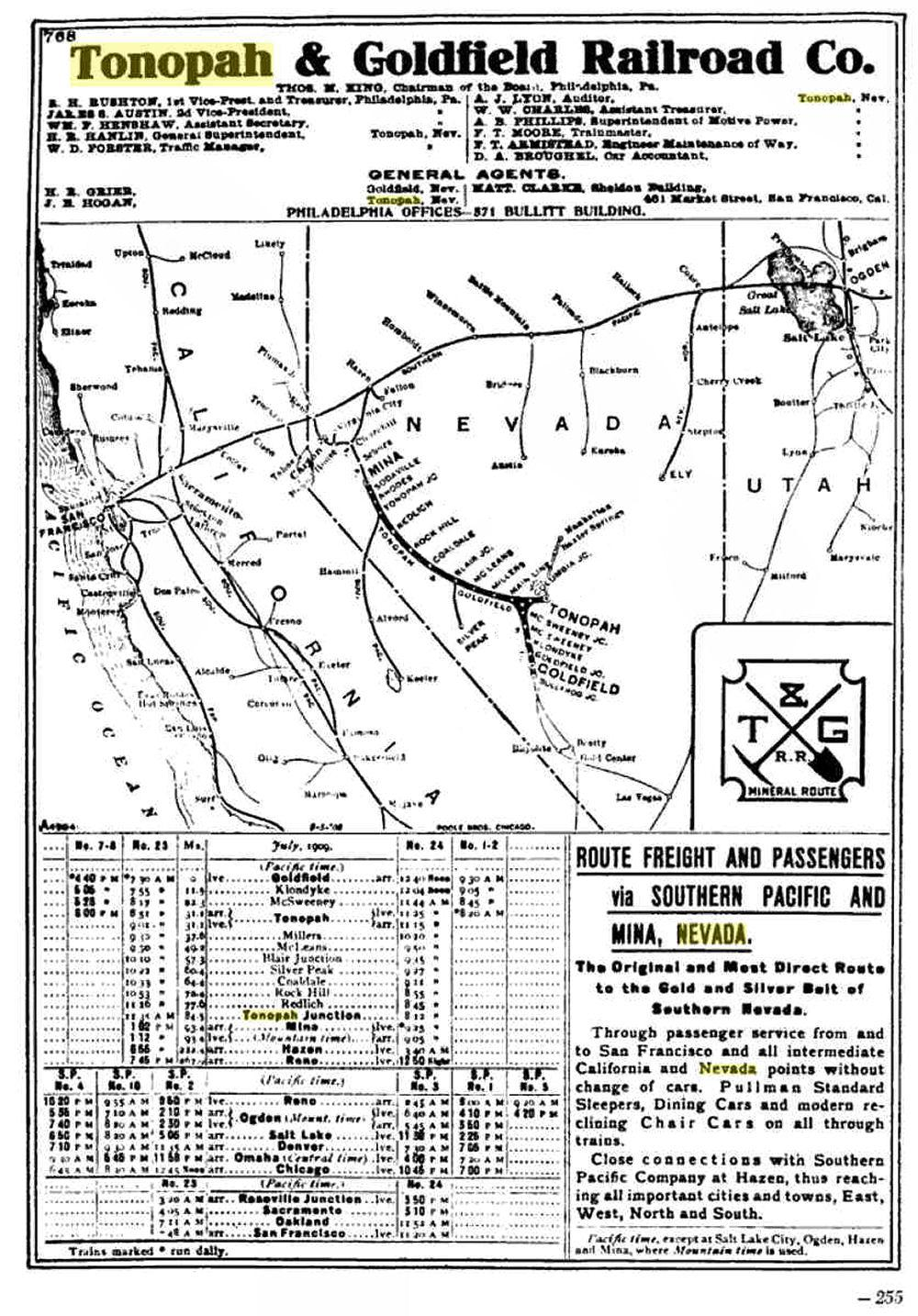
Tonopah and Goldfield RR Map and Logo
