= Goldfield (baseball) =

Goldfield "Miners"
- 1907; Goldfield, Nevada, US

Minor league affiliations
- Class: Independent (1907)
- League: Nevada State League (1907)

Major league affiliations
- Team: None

Minor league titles
- League titles (1): 1907*

Team data
- Name: Goldfield "Miners" (1907)
- Ballpark: Unknown (1907)

The Goldfield "Miners" were a minor league baseball team based in Goldfield, Nevada, United States. The "Miners" played the 1907 season as members of the Independent level Nevada State League.

The Goldfield Miners won the Nevada State League championship in the only season of minor league play for the league. It was the final minor league hosted in Goldfield, Nevada

== History ==
Prior to the Nevada State League, the Goldfield Athletic Club hosted local baseball teams, beginning in 1905.

In 1907, Goldfield was the largest city in Nevada, with over 20,000 residents. Goldfield became a charter member of the 1907 Nevada State League, which began minor league play as a four–team Independent league. John T. Powers, who later served as president of the Federal League, was the Nevada State League president. The 1907 Nevada State League charter franchises were based in Carson City, Nevada, Goldfield, Nevada, Reno, Nevada and Tonopah, Nevada.

On June 27, 1907 the Goldfield League Baseball Association was legally formed in Goldfield, likely the foundation for ownership of the minor league team.

With John T. Powers serving as league president and Bert Ulmer as treasurer a Nevada State League meeting July 6, 1907 was held at the office of Senator Boyd. At the meeting, the board of directors were elected. Ben Rosenthal of Goldfield, Senator James T. Boyd of Reno, J.P Merder of Carson City and Thomas Kendall of Tonopah became the directors. Powers had previously served as president of the Wisconsin State League. Ulmer was an owner of the Elite Saloon in Goldfield. James T. Boyd was a member of the Nevada State Senate from 1906 to 1910. Rosenthal was Goldfield County commissioner. Kendall was a mining pioneer, owner of the Kendall Mine and a founder of Tonopah.

As Goldfield played in their first season, they hosted a home game on August 7, 1907. League president John T. Powers was scheduled to umpire the Goldfield game on that day. Powers took the field with loaded revolvers strapped around his waist. With word that there was $5,000 in bets on the game, Powers armed himself. Powers was disarmed by the local sheriff before the game and the game was allowed to begin.

Research indicates the Goldfield franchise used the "Miners" moniker and won the Nevada State League championship in a shortened 1907 season. The other league members were noted to have been called the Carson City "Capitals", Reno "Mudhens" and Tonopah "Mollycoddlers". Unofficial records place Goldfield in first place with a 9–5 record. Goldfield was a head of second place Carson City, with a 7–4–1 record. They were followed by the Tonopah "Mollycoddlers" at 3–6 and the Reno "Mudhens" with a 3–7–1 record. It is noted that the Reno team disbanded on July 15, 1907, and it is possible the rest of the league, Goldfield included, followed suit, as only three teams would have remained. Goldfield has not hosted another minor league team.

== Ballpark ==
The name and location of the 1907 Goldfield ballpark is unknown. The Goldfield Athletic Club field was in use during the era. The park location was possibly in or near the area that was refurbished with help from promoter and Goldfield Saloon owner Tex Rickard to host an infamous 42-round boxing match on Labor Day 1906 featuring Joe Gans against Oscar Nelson. Gans won the bout. Today, there is a marker in Goldfield signifying the site of the fight, which had 15,000 in attendance.

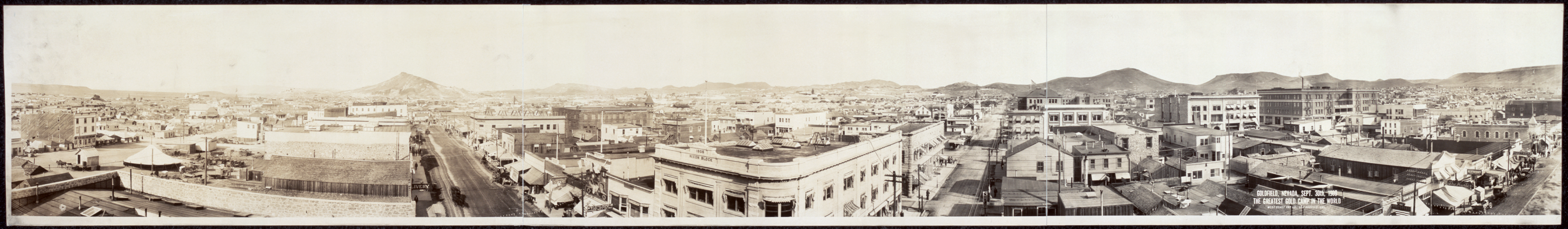
Sept. 30, 1909. Goldfield, Nevada.

== Timeline ==
Year(s)	# Yrs.	Team	Level	League
1907	1	Goldfield "Miners"	Independent	Nevada State League

== Year–by–year record ==
Year	Record	Finish	Manager	Playoffs/Notes
1907	9–5	1st	NA	League folded July 15

== Notable alumni ==
The Goldfield 1907 roster information is unknown.
