= Tonopah (baseball) =

Tonopah "Mollycoddlers"
- 1907; Tonopah, Nevada

Minor league affiliations
- Class: Independent (1907)
- League: Nevada State League (1907)

Major league affiliations
- Team: None

Minor league titles
- League titles (0): None

Team data
- Name: Tonopah (1907)
- Ballpark: Unknown (1907)

The Tonopah team was a minor league baseball team based in Tonopah, Nevada in 1907. The team nickname was noted to be the "Mollycoddlers," as Tonopah played the 1907 season as members of the Independent level Nevada State League. The 1907 Tonopah team was the only minor league team hosted in Tonopah, Nevada.

Tonopah also was home to the 1907 Tonopah Pullmans, possibly a negro leagues semi–pro team.

== History ==
In 1907, Tonopah was a charter member of the Nevada State League, which began minor league play in the 1907 season, operating as an Independent four–team league. The Nevada State League was formed under the direction of league president John T. Powers, who later was the first president of the Federal League. The 1907 Nevada State League was formed with the charter franchises based in Carson City, Nevada, Goldfield, Nevada, Reno, Nevada and Tonopah, Nevada.

The 1907 Nevada State League was established with Powers serving as league president and Bert Ulmer serving as the league treasurer. On July 6, 1907 a league meeting was held. The meeting was hosted at the office of Senator James Boyd in Carson City, and the Nevada State League Board of Directors was formed during this meeting. The directors chosen that day were Ben Rosenthal of Goldfield, Senator James T. Boyd of Reno, J.P Merder of Carson City and Thomas Kendall of Tonopah. Powers had previously served as president of the Wisconsin State League. Ulmer was an owner of the Elite Saloon in Goldfield. James T. Boyd was a member of the Nevada State Senate from 1906 to 1910. Rosenthal was Goldfield County commissioner. Kendall was a mining pioneer, owner of the Kendall Mine and a founder of Tonopah.

References indicate the Tonopah team was known as the Tonopah "Mollycoddlers". The other league members were noted to have been called the Carson City "Capitals" Goldfield "Miners" and Reno "Mudhens," Unofficial records place the Tonopah team in third place, behind the 1st place Goldfield "Miners," who had a 9–5 record and Carson City with a 7–4–1 record. They were followed by the Tonopah "Mollycoddlers" with a 3–6 record and the Reno "Mudhens" with a 3–7–1 record. It is noted that the Reno team disbanded on July 15, 1907. It is likely the rest of the league, Tonopah included, followed suit in folding, as only three teams would have remained. Tonopah did not host another minor league team.

There are photographs of a second Tonopah 1907 team called the Tonopah Pullmans. The Pullmans were possibly a negro leagues barnstorming or semi–pro team. It is noted that this team consisted of railroad workers who had formed their own Fraternal Lodge in Tonopah. The Pullmans' listed roster from September 27, 1907 included Buck, Underwood, Powell, Morris, Taylor, Lindsey, Clarence Townsend, Charles Townsend, Hall, Troutman and Curby.

== The ballpark ==
The exact name and location of the 1907 Tonopah ballpark is unknown.

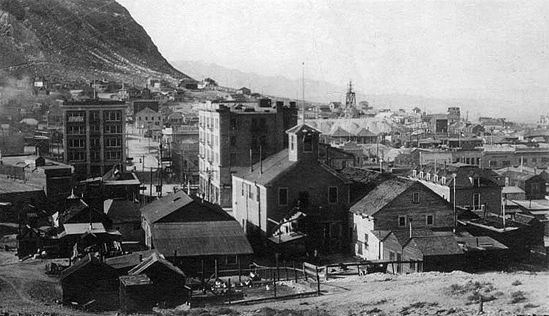
Tonopah, Nevada in 1913

== Timeline ==
Year(s)	# Yrs.	Team	Level	League
1907 (1)	1	Tonopah "Mollycoddlers"	Independent	Nevada State League
1907 (2)	1	Tonopah Pullmans	Unknown	Unknown

== Year–by–year records ==
Year	Record	Finish	Manager	Playoffs/Notes
1907	3–6	3rd	NA	None held

== Notable alumni ==
No roster information for the 1907 Tonopah minor league team is known.
