= Mineral County Courthouse (Nevada) =

- U.S. National Register of Historic Places
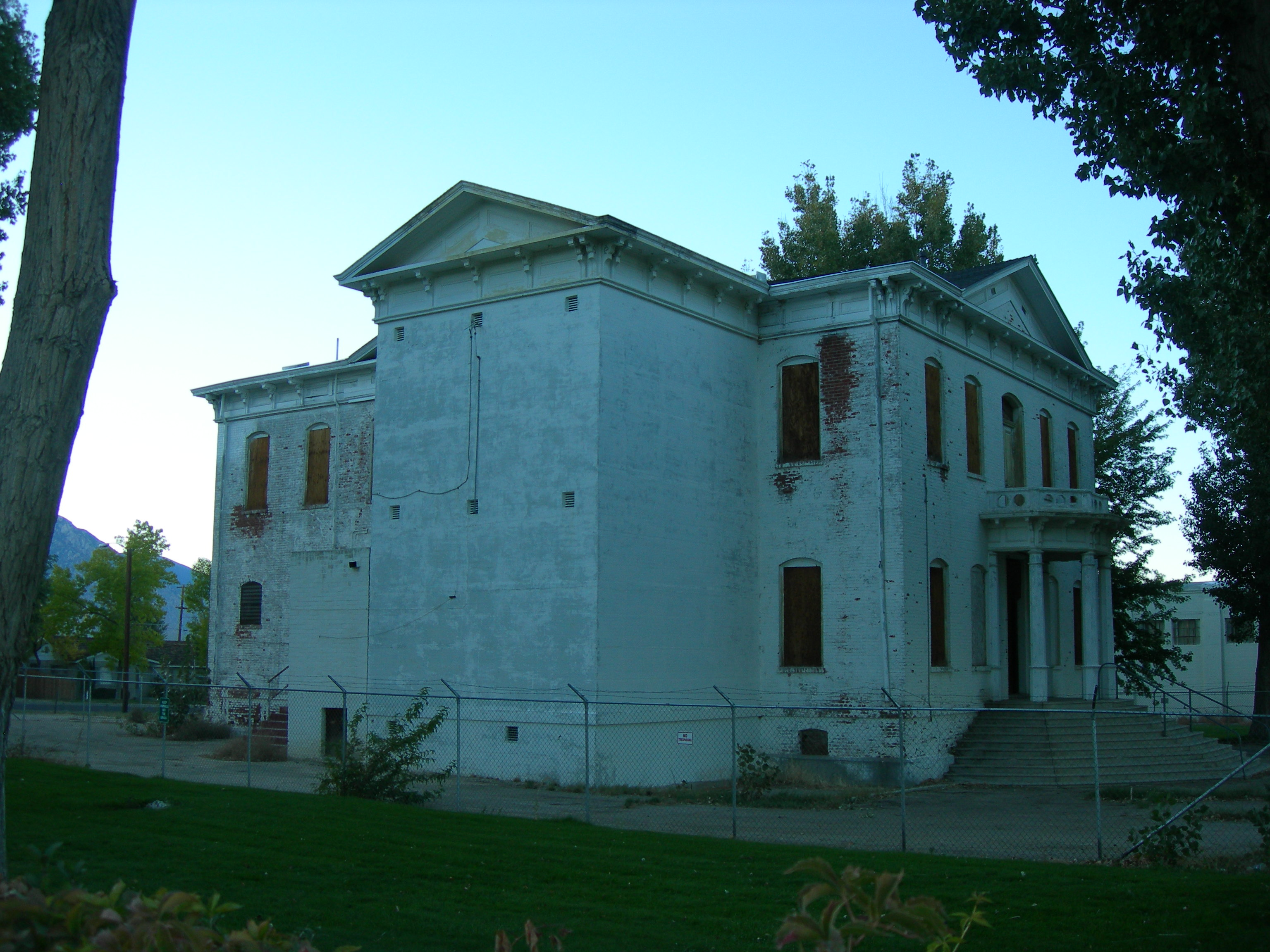
- Old Esmeralda & Mineral County Court House

- Location within Nevada Location within the United States
- Interactive map showing the location of Mineral County Courthouse
- Location: 551 C Street, Hawthorne, Nevada
- Coordinates: 38°31′31″N 118°37′23″W
- Built: 1883
- Architect: A. C. Glenn; George W. Babcock
- Architectural style: Italianate
- NRHP reference No.: 82003214
- Added to NRHP: January 29, 1982

The Mineral County Courthouse, also known as the 1883 Esmeralda County Courthouse and the Old Mineral County Courthouse, is an historic county courthouse building located at 551 C Street in Hawthorne, Mineral County, Nevada. Built in 1883 as the Esmeralda County Courthouse, it served as such until 1907 when the county seat was moved to Goldfield. In 1911 when Mineral County was created, it became the first Mineral County Courthouse, and served until 1970, when a new courthouse was constructed. It is the only building in Nevada to have served as the courthouse of two different counties. On January 29, 1982 it was listed on the National Register of Historic Places. As of 2008 (photo), it was fenced off and in disrepair.

== Description ==
On a residential street with other public structures close by, the Old Mineral County Courthouse is situated in a park-like setting. Furnished with a single-story portico and a composite roofline, it is a 2-story rectangular unreinforced brick building. The courthouse has an enormous lawn and a number old Cottonwood trees which provide shade with the Community Center next at hand.

The Italianate-Building was decorated with braced sidewalls, vaguely arched window and door openings, and a bracketed cornice along the roofline. 4 elevations of the building are capped with the Central gables. An unusual accent is added to the structure by the entrance porch in a 5-sided semicircular shape with wooden columns, and a balustrade in a pentagram design.

The National Emergency Recovery Act of the 1930s added a concrete vault and removed the roof's cupola which the authority claimed to be too heavy for the building. Also, the workers changed the first wooden portico on the east with a concrete version of a moderately dissimilar style.

== History and Context ==
The natives of the fledgling town had mounted a campaign to acquire county seat status less than 2 years after the infant community of Hawthorne was founded as a station on the newly-constructed Carson & Colorado Railroad. The Legislature of the State accepted an act for removing the county seat of Esmeralda County from Aurora to Hawthorne. The Legislature also approved the bonds selling to collect funds for managing the cost of construction for a courthouse within a sum which will not exceed 30,000 dollars on 1 March 1883. The transfer of office was effective from July 1 of the same year.

Officials of Esmeralda County permitted a construction contract for 29,125 USD in 1883 to George W. Babcock. The officials chose A.C. Glenn for supervising the construction of the courthouse. In the course of the process, Mr. Glenn was replaced by D.R. Munro. Differences occurred between authorized plans and the project in progress which created a controversy among the locals. The increased cost was 33,976 USD after the changes.

== See also ==
- Esmeralda County Courthouse, Goldfield, Nevada
