= Goldfield Hotel =

- U.S. Historic district – Contributing property
- Nevada State Register of Historic Places 03/04/81
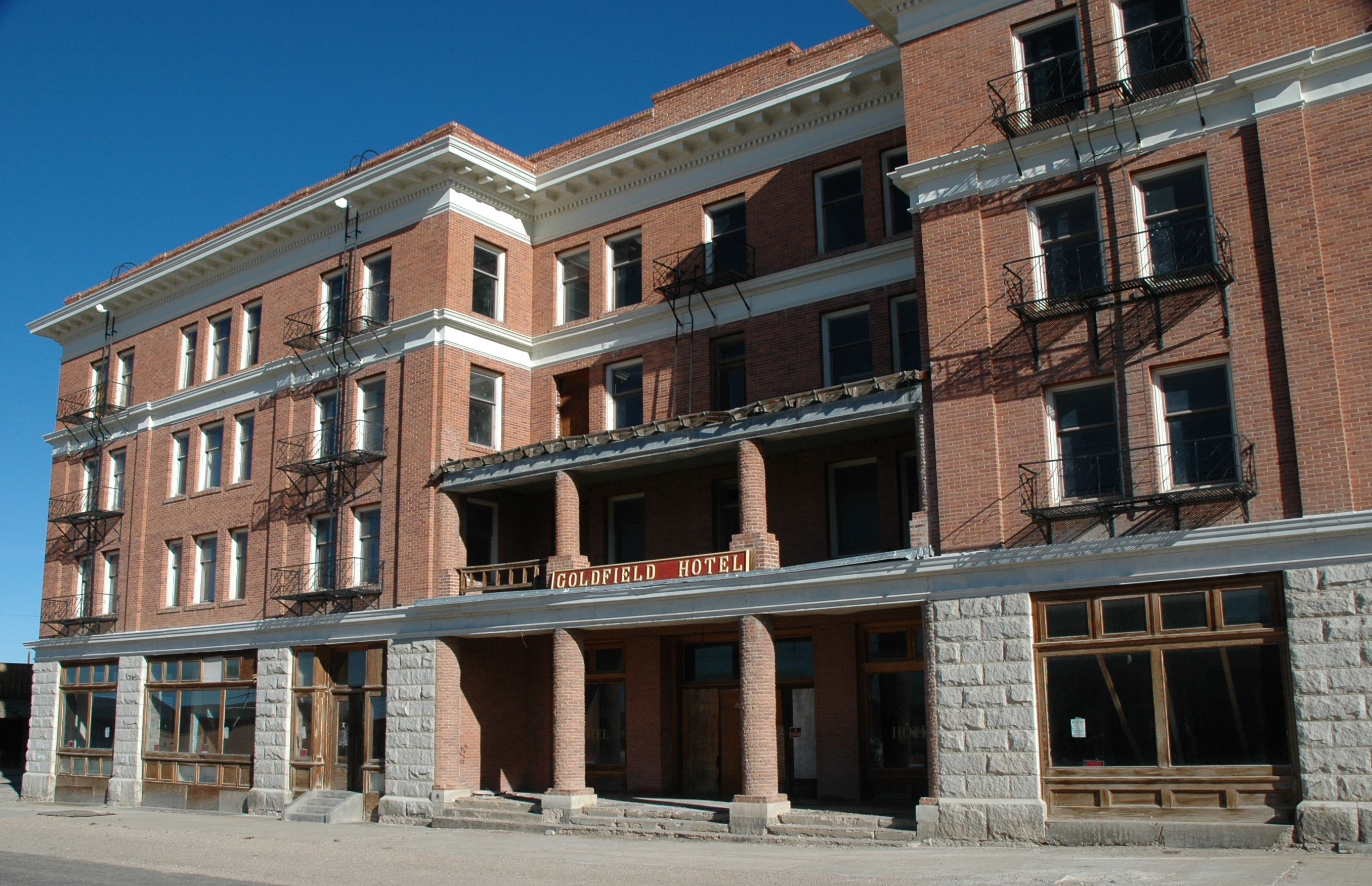
- Goldfield Hotel main entrance on Columbia Avenue in 2009

- Location within Nevada Location within the United States
- Location: S.E. corner of Crook Ave. U.S. 95 & Columbia St. Goldfield, Nevada
- Coordinates: 37°42′29″N 117°14′8″W
- Built: 1907–1908
- Architect: Curtis and Holesworth
- Architectural style: Classical Revival
- Part of: Goldfield Historic District (ID82003213)

Significant dates
- Added to NRHP: June 14, 1982
- Designated Date: 03/04/81

The Goldfield Hotel is a historic four-story building located at the southeast corner of Crook Avenue (U.S. 95) and Columbia Avenue in Goldfield, Esmeralda County, Nevada. Designed in the Classical Revival style of architecture by Reno architects Morrill J. Curtis (1848–1921) and George E. Holesworth (born 1854) of the firm of Curtis and Morrill, it was built between 1907 and 1908 on the site of two earlier hotels of the same name which had burnt down. Built in a U-shape in order to ensure outside windows for each guest room, the building has its west or main facade extending 180 feet (55 m) along Columbia Street with the north wing fronting 100 feet (30 m) on Crook Avenue and the south wing fronting 100 feet (30 m) along an alleyway. The ground floor exterior facades were built of grey granite stones from Rocklin, California while the interior first floor facade and all upper story facades were built of redbrick. The top floor exterior facades were crowned with a white cornice. On March 4, 1981, it was added to the Nevada State Register of Historic Places. It is a contributing property in the Goldfield Historic District, which was added to the National Register of Historic Places on June 14, 1982.

== History ==
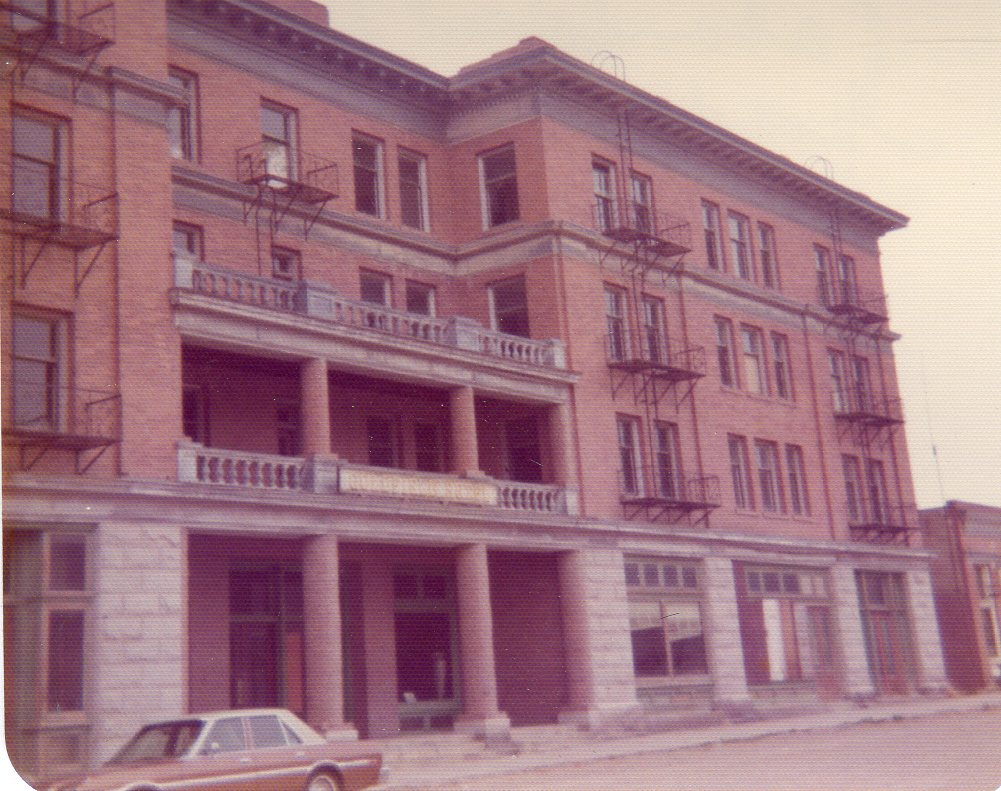
Goldfield Hotel main entrance on Columbia Street in 1976

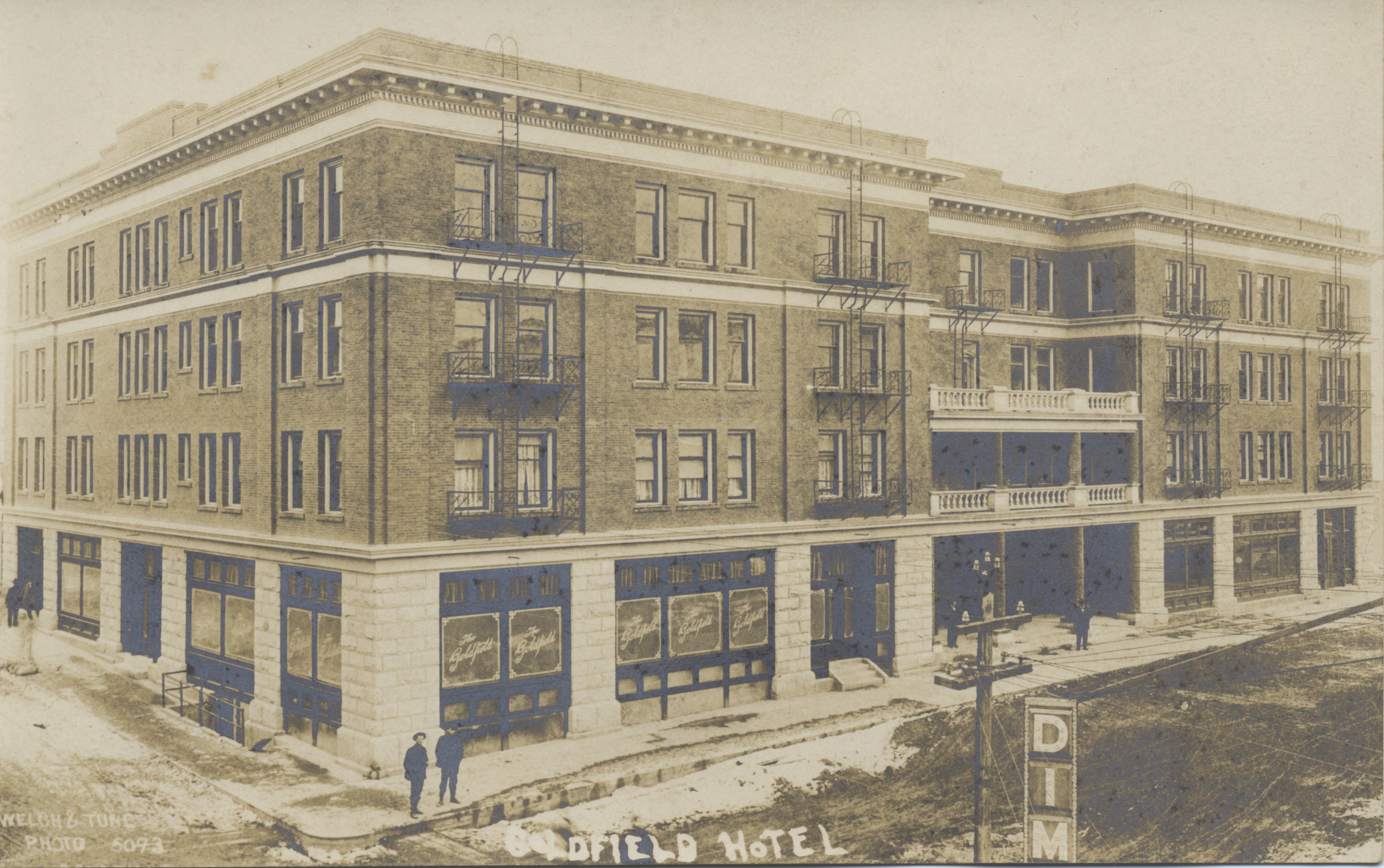
Historic photo of the Goldfield Hotel in winter, likely from the 1910s.

Built at a cost of between $300,000 and $400,000, it was reported to be the most spectacular hotel in Nevada at the time of its completion in 1908. Champagne is said to have flowed down the front steps in the opening ceremony. Its 150 rooms were fitted with pile carpets, many with private baths, and the lobby was trimmed in mahogany, with black leather upholstery and gilded columns. It also featured an elevator and crystal chandeliers.

The hotel was in use as such until the end of World War II, its last occupants being officers and their families from the Tonopah Army Air Field. Despite several renovation attempts over the years, it has remained unoccupied. In the 1980s, California developer Lester O'Shea spent $4 million trying to turn the hotel into an Edwardian-style tourist retreat, but that project eventually collapsed in bankruptcy proceedings.

At the 2003 Goldfield Days auction, the hotel was sold to Edgar S. "Red" Roberts, a rancher and engineer from Carson City, for about $360,000. Roberts told The Wall Street Journal in 2004 that he had plans to refurbish the bottom two floors of the four-story hotel and open them to the public by 2006. He also told the newspaper: "It's a challenge. I may regret it." As of 2010, work remained uncompleted.

Goldfield resident Virginia Ridgway spent three decades as caretaker and "keeper of the keys" to the hotel, granting visitors access to the building and accompanying them as they toured its floors. In January 2016, Ridgway announced that she was giving up that role and turned the keys of the hotel over to Malek DaVarpanah, who owns an antique shop in Goldfield.

In September 2017, the Pahrump (Nev.) Valley Times reported that renovation work on the Goldfield Hotel had resumed.

The hotel was put up for sale in 2022; the sale included the hotel and other nearby properties for a price of $4.9 million.

== In media ==
The building was used in the film Vanishing Point (1971) as the site of Super Soul's radio station, KOW. It also featured in the film Cherry 2000 (1987) and the film Ghosts of Goldfield (2007).

In 2004, the American television programme Ghost Adventures featured the property, where cast members Zak Bagans and Nick Groff conducted a paranormal investigation. The investigation became famous for a specific incident in the basement when a brick was seemingly flung across the room on its own, provoking a terrified response from Bagans.

Four years later, in 2008, TAPS of the popular Syfy show Ghost Hunters investigated the hotel.

A researcher for the Central Nevada Museum, however, notes that there are "inconsistencies" in the stories, and most apparently stem from a book written by a former owner of the property. The notoriety has not helped the hotel rehab and has led to frequent vandalism and unauthorised entry.

In 2011, Ghost Adventures returned to the hotel to conduct a third investigation, during which the crew observed a significant amount of unexplained activity. In that episode, Bagans learned that owner Red Roberts was in talks with people who were interested in buying the hotel. In 2013, the Ghost Adventures crew returned once again for a fourth investigation where, like their previous investigations, a lot of unexplained activity was captured.

In 2021, Ghost Adventures returned to the hotel to conduct a fifth investigation, during which the crew observed a significant amount of unexplained activity.

== See also ==
- Mizpah Hotel, designed by one of the same architects.
