= Esmeralda County Courthouse =

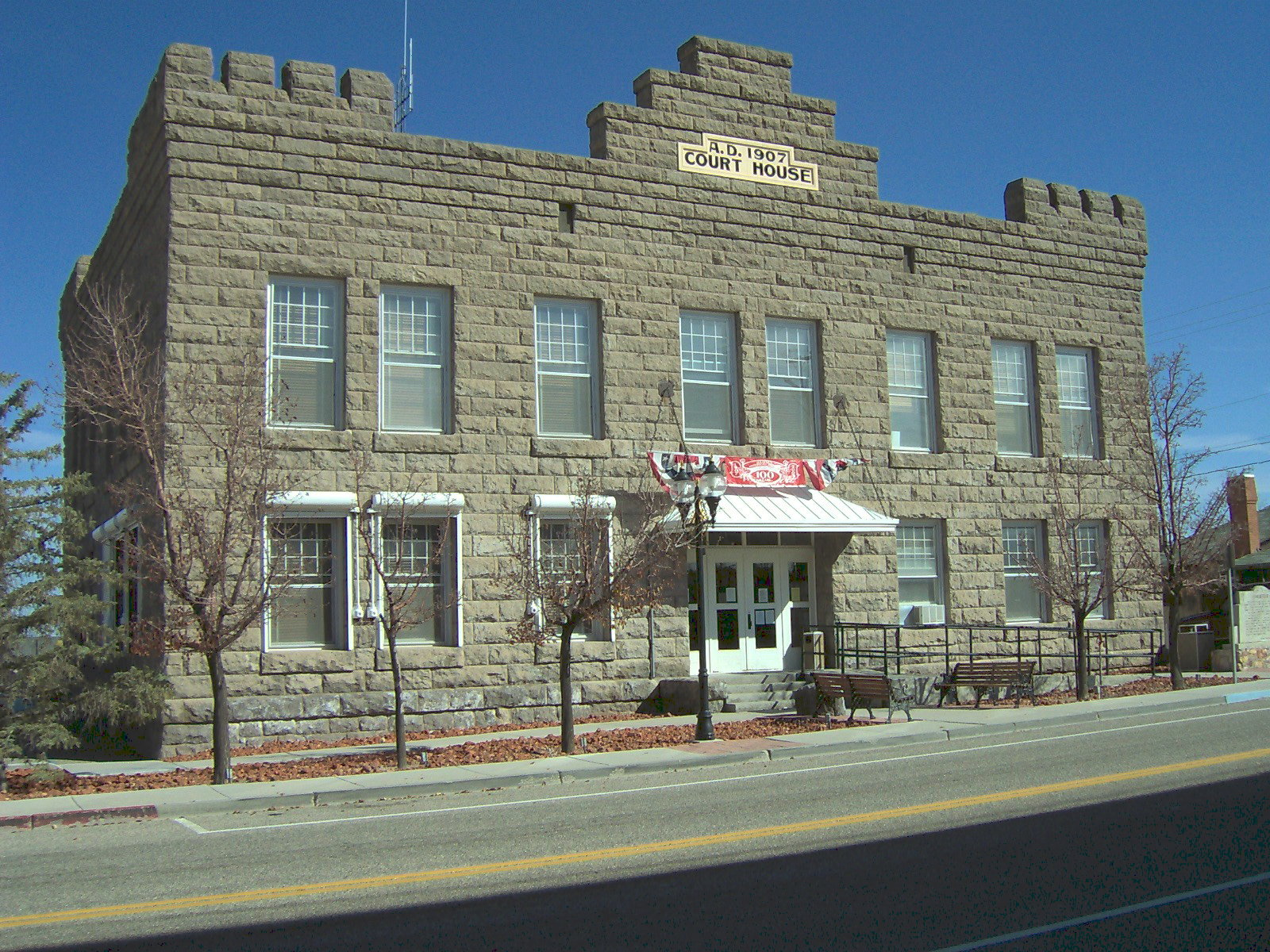
- Interactive map of the Esmeralda County Courthouse area

General information
- Completed: 1907

Technical details
- Floor count: 2

Design and construction
- Main contractor: John Shea
- Esmeralda County Courthouse
- U.S. Historic district – Contributing property
- Location within Nevada Location within the United States
- Location: NE corner of Crook and Euclid Avenues; Goldfield, Nevada
- Coordinates: 37°42′31″N 117°14′3″W
- Built: 1907
- Part of: Goldfield Historic District (ID82003213)
- Added to NRHP: June 14, 1982

The Esmeralda County Courthouse, built in 1907, is a historic two-story county courthouse located on the northeast corner of Crook Avenue (U.S. 95) and Euclid Avenue in Goldfield, Esmeralda County, Nevada. It is a contributing property in the Goldfield Historic District and still serves as the county's courthouse.

== See also ==
- Mineral County Courthouse, the previous courthouse for Esmeralda County
