= Goldfield Hills =

Mountain range in Esmeralda County, Nevada, US

- Location within Nevada

Highest point
- Elevation: 1,929 m (6,329 ft)

Geography
- Country: United States
- State: Nevada
- District: Esmeralda County
- Range coordinates: 37°36′31.757″N 117°14′51.279″W
- Topo map: USGS Ralston

The Goldfield Hills is a mountain range in Esmeralda County, Nevada, south of the mining district and town of Goldfield, in the Great Basin.
