= Preble Mountain =

Summit in Nevada, United States

Coordinates: 37.7035445°N 117.1672987°W

Preble Mountain is a summit in the U.S. state of Nevada. The elevation is 6,539 feet (1,993 m).

Preble Mountain was named after Charles S. Preble, a government surveyor.
