= Goldfield, Nevada =

County seat of Esmeralda County, Nevada

Goldfield
- Unincorporated town
- Downtown Goldfield in 2026.

- Goldfield is located in the Tonopah Basin of Nevada. Goldfield (the United States)
- Coordinates: 37°42′31″N 117°14′08″W
- Country: United States
- State: Nevada
- County: Esmeralda
- Founded: 1902; 124 years ago
- Named for: Gold

Area
  - Total: 1.48 sq mi (3.84 km^{2})
  - Land: 1.48 sq mi (3.84 km^{2})
  - Water: 0 sq mi (0.00 km^{2})
- Elevation: 5,686 ft (1,733 m)

Population (2020)
  - Total: 225
  - Density: 151.9/sq mi (58.66/km^{2})
- Time zone: UTC−8 (PST)
  - Summer (DST): UTC−7 (PDT)
- ZIP code: 89013
- Area code: 775
- FIPS code: 32-28900
- GNIS feature ID: 854468

Goldfield is an unincorporated town, census-designated place, and county seat of Esmeralda County, Nevada. As of the 2020 census, the town had a population of 225. Goldfield is located roughly 247 miles (398 km) southeast of Carson City and 188 miles (303 km) northwest of Las Vegas along U.S. Route 95.

Goldfield was founded after gold was discovered there in 1902, and it grew rapidly as the center of Nevada’s early 20th century mining boom. By 1906 it had about 20,000 residents and was briefly the largest city in the state. That year it hosted the lightweight boxing championship between Joe Gans and Battling Nelson, and in 1905 it became the county seat. Disputes between mine owners and the Western Federation of Miners led Theodore Roosevelt to send federal troops to the town in December 1907, which in turn prompted the Nevada Legislature to create the Nevada State Police. Production and population declined after the boom: the town had 4,838 residents by 1910, the largest mining company left in 1919, and a fire in 1923 destroyed much of the town.

Several buildings from the boom years survive, including the Goldfield Hotel, the Esmeralda County Courthouse, and the Goldfield High School building. Most of them are within the Goldfield Historic District, which was listed on the National Register of Historic Places in 1982. The town holds the annual Goldfield Days festival and is home to the International Car Forest of the Last Church. It has also served as a filming location, including for Vanishing Point .

== History ==
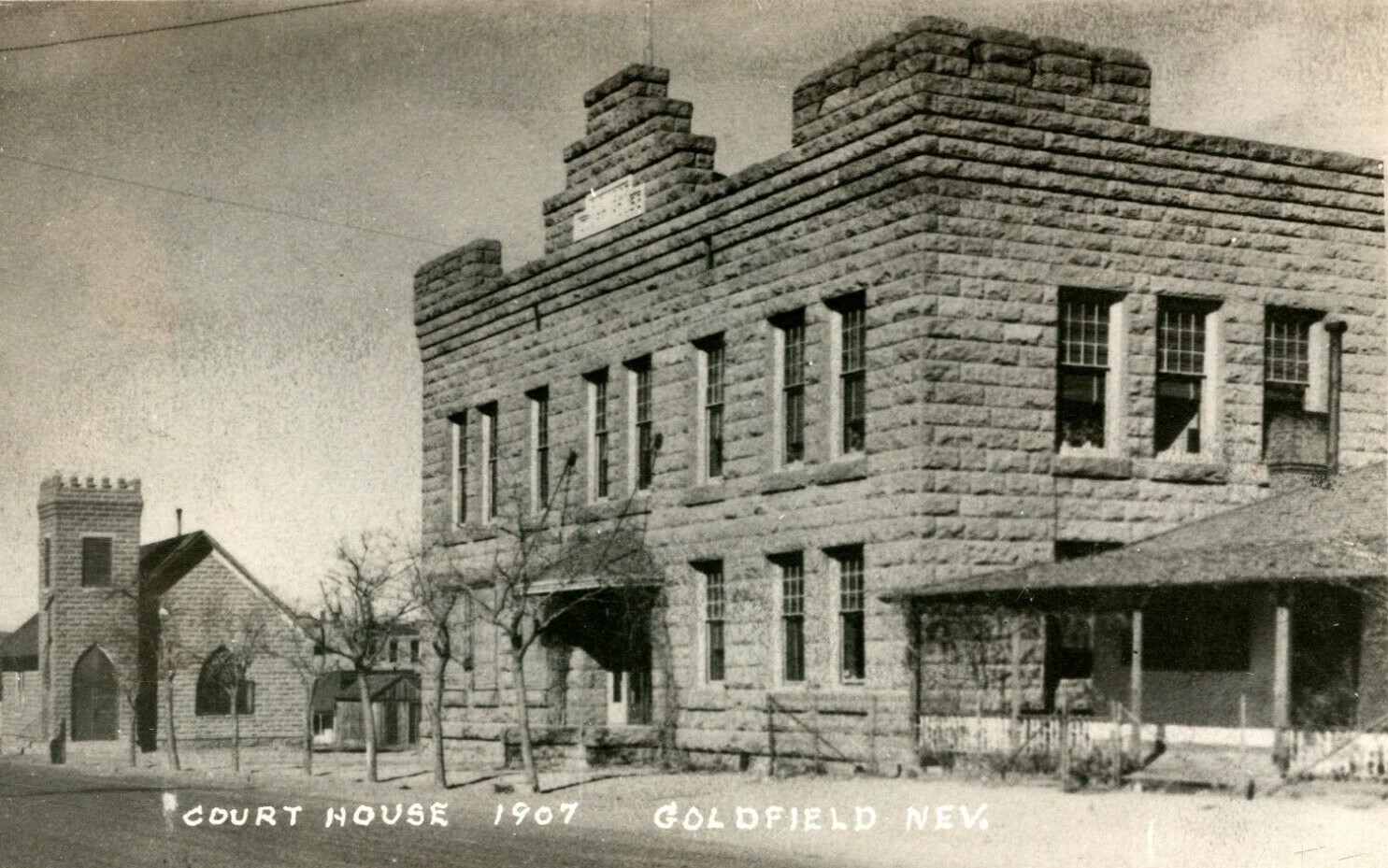
1907 postcard showing the Esmeralda County courthouse.

Esmeralda County courthouse in 2026.

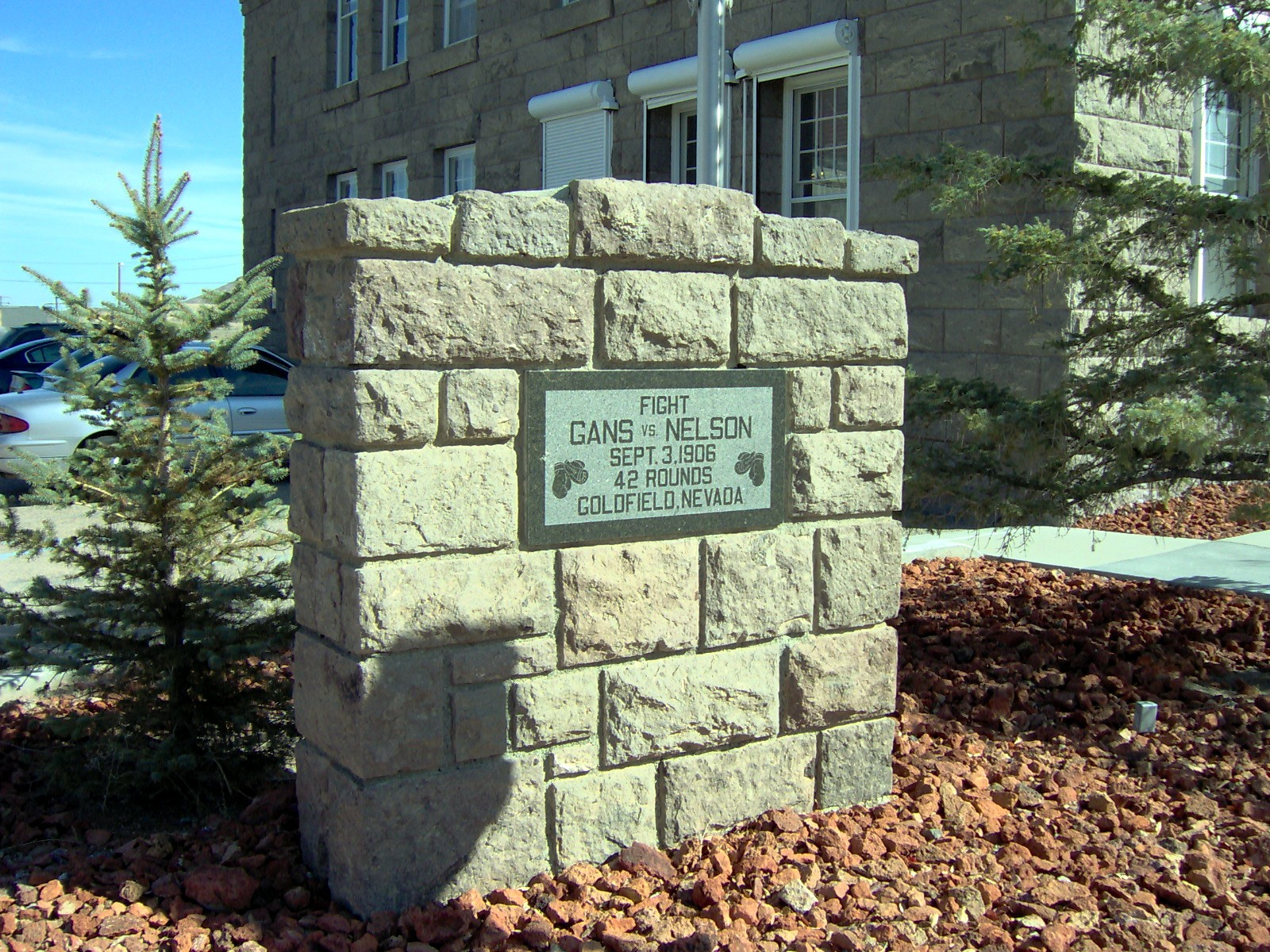
Commemorative marker in front of the courthouse for the 1906 Gans–Nelson boxing match.

The community was named for deposits of gold near the original town site. Gold was discovered at Goldfield in 1902, its year of inception. By 1904, the Goldfield district produced about 800 tons of ore, valued at $2,300,000, 30% of the state's production that year. This remarkable production caused Goldfield to grow rapidly, and it soon became the largest town in the state with about 20,000 people.

One notorious, early Goldfield resident was George Graham Rice, a former check forger, newspaperman, and racetrack tipster, turned mining stock promoter. The collapse of his Sullivan Trust Company and its associated mining stocks caused the failure of the Goldfield State Bank in 1907. Rice quickly left Goldfield, but continued to promote mining shares for another quarter-century.

A prominent resident from 1906 was George Wingfield, one of Nevada's entrepreneurs, who built the Goldfield Hotel. In collaboration with his partner George S. Nixon (who was to become a U.S. senator in 1904), Wingfield started in Belmont, Nevada in 1901, and saw the potential of Goldfield after mining at Tonopah, 27 miles (43 km) north, took off. Nixon and Wingfield made huge fortunes in Goldfield by forming the Goldfield Consolidated Mining Company. By 1906, they were worth $30 million.

Wingfield moved to Reno, where his great wealth could be spread across northern Nevada and northern California. Between 1903 and 1918, mining in Belmont and Goldfield grew from $2.8 million to $48.6 million.

Wyatt and Virgil Earp came to Goldfield in 1904. Virgil was hired as a Goldfield deputy sheriff in January 1905. In April, he contracted pneumonia and, after six months of illness, died on October 19, 1905. Wyatt left Goldfield shortly afterward.

Goldfield reached a peak population around 20,000 people in 1906 and hosted a lightweight boxing championship match between Joe Gans and Oscar "Battling" Nelson. Goldfield briefly became Nevada's largest city.

Unoccupied Goldfield High School under restoration in 2026.

In addition to the mines, Goldfield was home to large reduction works. The gold output in 1907 was over $8.4 million, the year in which the town became the county seat; in 1908, output was about $4,880,000. In the early 1900s, Consolidated Mining dug an adit at Alkali, Nevada to deliver water 10 miles (16 km) to the 100-stamp Combination Mill near Goldfield.

By the 1910 census, its population had declined to 4,838. Part of the problem was the increasing cost of pumping brine out of the diggings, making them uneconomic. By 1912, ore production had dropped to $5 million, and the largest mining company left town in 1919. In 1923, a fire caused by a moonshine still explosion destroyed most of the town's flammable buildings. Some brick and stone buildings from before the fire remain, including the hotel and the high school.

=== Labor relations ===
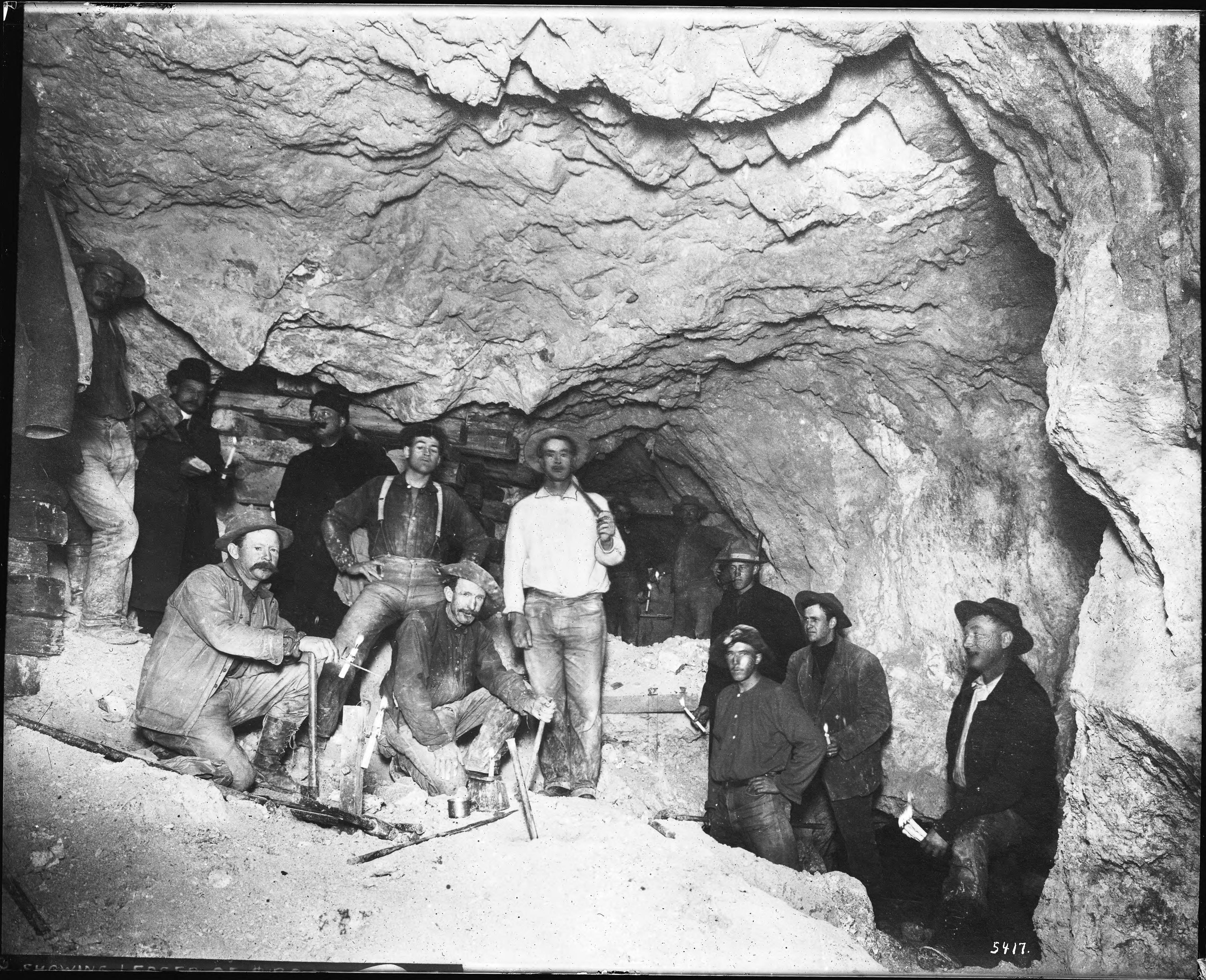
Interior view of mine and miners in the Mohawk Mine, circa 1900–1905

Soon after mining on an extensive scale began, the miners organized themselves as a local branch of the Western Federation of Miners, which also included many laborers. Between this branch and the mine owners, serious differences arose, and several strikes occurred in December 1906 and January 1907 for higher wages.

In March and April 1907, the owners refused to discharge carpenters who belonged to American Federation of Labor, but were not members of the Industrial Workers of the World-affiliated Western Federation of Miners; a strike followed, resulting in forcing the IWW out of Goldfield, despite at one point counting the 1,500 miners as well as hundreds of white-collar and service workers as members.

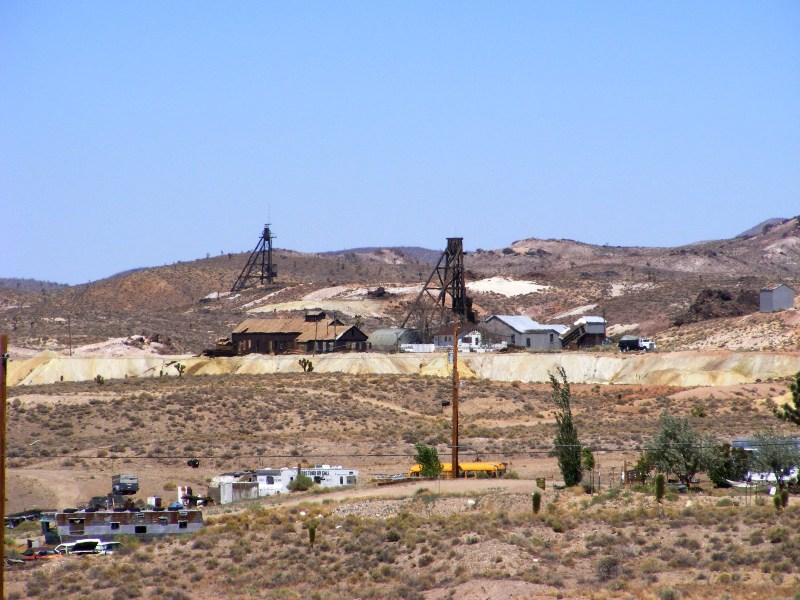
The old Florence Hill Mines above Goldfield

This defeat came after a bitter struggle which saw IWW organizer Vincent Saint John first imprisoned and charged with conspiracy, then shot by a gunman in the street on November 5 along with two other IWW members.

Beginning in August 1907, a rule was introduced at some of the mines requiring miners to change their clothing before entering and after leaving the mines – made necessary according to the operators by the wholesale theft of the valuable ore (worth as much as $20 a pound) in a practice known as "high-grading". In November and December 1907, some of the owners adopted a system of paying in cashier's checks. Except for occasional attacks upon nonunion workmen, or persons unsympathetic to the miners' union, no serious disturbance in Goldfield occurred. However, at the insistence of the mine owners, Governor John Sparks appealed in December 1907 to President Theodore Roosevelt to send federal troops to Goldfield on the grounds that the situation there was ominous, that destruction of life and property seemed probable, and that the state had no militia and would be powerless to maintain order.

On December 4, 1907, Roosevelt ordered the commander of the Division of California at San Francisco, General Frederick Funston, to proceed with 300 federal troops to Goldfield. The troops arrived in Goldfield on December 6, and immediately afterwards, the mine owners reduced wages and announced that no members of the Western Federation of Miners would thereafter be employed in the mines. Roosevelt, becoming convinced that conditions had not warranted Sparks's appeal for assistance, but that the immediate withdrawal of the troops might lead to serious disorder, consented that they should remain for a short time on condition that the state should immediately organize an adequate militia or police force. Accordingly, a special meeting of the legislature was immediately called, a state police force was organized, and on March 7, 1908, the troops were withdrawn. Thereafter, work was gradually resumed in the mines, the dispute having been won by the mine-owners.

== Historic district ==
- Goldfield Historic District
- U.S. National Register of Historic Places
- U.S. Historic district
- Nevada Historical Marker No. 14
- Location: Roughly bounded by 5th Street and Miner, Spring, Crystal and Elliott Avenues, Goldfield, Nevada
- Coordinates: 37°42′31″N 117°14′3″W
- Area: 200 acres (81 ha)
- Built: 1902 et seq
- Architect: various
- Architectural style: American Craftsman, Eclectic Revival, Georgian Revival, and Mission Revival
- NRHP reference No.: 82003213
- Marker No.: 14
- Added to NRHP: June 14, 1982

The Goldfield Historic District encompasses 200 acres (81 ha) and is roughly bounded by 5th Street and Miner, Spring, Crystal and Elliott avenues. The district contains nearly 120 buildings, most dating from the time of Goldfield's initial growth between 1904 and 1909 in a variety of architectural styles, namely American Craftsman, Georgian Revival, Mission Revival, and Eclectic Revival.

On June 14, 1982, the district was listed on the National Register of Historic Places.

Among the buildings located in the Goldfield Historic District are:

- The 1906–08 Goldfield High School, which survived the fire of 1923/24; it is in poor condition, but the Goldfield Historical Society received a matching grant of $296,000 in 2018 from the National Park Service under the Save America's Treasures Grant Program.
- The 1907–1908 Goldfield Hotel at Crook Avenue (U.S. 95) and Columbia Street has remained unoccupied since the end of World War II.
- Southern Nevada Consolidated Telephone-Telegraph Company Building
- Esmeralda County Courthouse, built in the Mission Revival style, has been in continuous operation since its opening in 1908 and is the seat of the Fifth Judicial District of Nevada, court of the judicial township of Goldfield, and is the location for most county government offices, including the Esmeralda County sheriff, assessor, clerk, treasurer, auditor, and county commission.

== Geography ==
Malpais Mesa to the west of Goldfield.

Goldfield is in the Great Basin of west-central Nevada, on U.S. Route 95 about 26 miles south of Tonopah. The hills around it form an irregular cluster with no definite trend and belong to no recognized mountain range. To the north, east, and south these hills slope down to broad, undrained desert basins, each with a salt-crusted playa at its center, and the playa floors average about 5,000 feet above sea level.

Myers Mountain, part of the Goldfield Hills range, and the eastern skyline of Goldfield.

The town lies at a mean elevation of 5,690 feet on a high, flat area between the Goldfield Hills, a low and rugged range to the east and north, and Malpais Mesa to the west and south. Columbia Mountain, at 6,097 feet, stands directly northeast of town on the line of the townsite’s north–south axis and was the site of the district’s original mining claims. Much of the ground immediately around the town is a rolling plateau at roughly 5,700 to 5,800 feet. Scattered peaks and knobs rise above it, including Preble, Blackcap, Vindicator, Banner, and Columbia mountains. Despite some early accounts, none of these is a volcanic crater; they stand higher because their rock is more resistant than the surrounding material, often hardened by local silicification.

=== Climate ===
Goldfield's climate is arid (Köppen BWk), bordering on semi-arid.

An average of 35.9 afternoons with maximum temperatures of 90 °F (32.2 °C) or higher and 146.1 mornings with minimum temperatures of 32 °F (0 °C) occur. The record high temperature was 108 °F (42.2 °C) on July 20, 1906, and June 9, 1935. The record low temperature was −23 °F (−30.6 °C) on January 21, 1937. On average, 1.5 mornings per year have temperature of or below 0 °F (−17.8 °C), and an average of 10.6 days per year have temperatures of 32 °F (0 °C) or lower all day long.

The long-term average precipitation in Goldfield is 6.06 inches (154 mm). An average of 29 days have measurable precipitation. The wettest calendar year was 1978 with 13.19 inches (335.0 mm) and the driest 1934 with 1.47 inches (37.3 mm). The most precipitation in one month was 6.07 inches (154.2 mm) in August 1931, and the most in 24 hours was 2.43 inches (61.7 mm) on June 19, 1918.

Average annual snowfall is 17.8 inches or 0.45 meters. The most snowfall in one season was 52.5 inches or 1.3 meters between July 1968 and June 1969, including the record monthly snowfall of 42.0 inches or 1.1 meters in February 1969. By contrast, no measurable snow fell between July 1991 and June 1992, or between July 1999 and June 2000.

Climate data for Goldfield, Nevada (1906–2009)
Month	Jan	Feb	Mar	Apr	May	Jun	Jul	Aug	Sep	Oct	Nov	Dec	Year
Record high °F (°C)	67 (19)	76 (24)	79 (26)	87 (31)	97 (36)	108 (42)	108 (42)	103 (39)	98 (37)	87 (31)	79 (26)	66 (19)	108 (42)
Mean daily maximum °F (°C)	42.2 (5.7)	47.1 (8.4)	54.2 (12.3)	62.5 (16.9)	71.3 (21.8)	81.4 (27.4)	89.6 (32.0)	87.4 (30.8)	79.0 (26.1)	66.5 (19.2)	52.9 (11.6)	43.3 (6.3)	64.8 (18.2)
Daily mean °F (°C)	31.3 (−0.4)	35.7 (2.1)	41.6 (5.3)	48.8 (9.3)	57.1 (13.9)	66.1 (18.9)	74.2 (23.4)	72.1 (22.3)	64.0 (17.8)	52.7 (11.5)	40.5 (4.7)	32.4 (0.2)	51.4 (10.8)
Mean daily minimum °F (°C)	20.3 (−6.5)	24.3 (−4.3)	29.0 (−1.7)	35.2 (1.8)	42.9 (6.1)	50.9 (10.5)	58.7 (14.8)	56.9 (13.8)	48.9 (9.4)	38.8 (3.8)	28.3 (−2.1)	21.5 (−5.8)	38.0 (3.3)
Record low °F (°C)	−23.0 (−30.6)	−13.0 (−25.0)	0.0 (−17.8)	8.0 (−13.3)	19.0 (−7.2)	22.0 (−5.6)	38.0 (3.3)	36.0 (2.2)	21.0 (−6.1)	12.0 (−11.1)	−1.0 (−18.3)	−13.0 (−25.0)	−23.0 (−30.6)
Average precipitation inches (mm)	0.63 (16)	0.77 (20)	0.63 (16)	0.54 (14)	0.50 (13)	0.37 (9.4)	0.45 (11)	0.52 (13)	0.44 (11)	0.44 (11)	0.38 (9.7)	0.39 (9.9)	6.06 (154)
Average snowfall inches (cm)	3.3 (8.4)	3.7 (9.4)	3.6 (9.1)	1.9 (4.8)	0.5 (1.3)	0 (0)	0 (0)	0 (0)	0 (0)	0.7 (1.8)	1.5 (3.8)	2.6 (6.6)	17.8 (45.2)
Average precipitation days (≥ 0.01 inch)	3	3	3	3	3	2	3	2	2	2	2	2	29
Source: "Climate Of Goldfield, Nevada". Western Regional Climate Center.

== Demographics ==
Historical population
Year	Pop.	±%
1906	~20,000	—
1910	4,838	—
1920	1,558	−67.8%
1930	692	−55.6%
1940	554	−19.9%
1950	336	−39.4%
1960	184	−45.2%
1990	655	+256.0%
2000	440	−32.8%
2010	268	−39.1%
2020	225	−16.0%
Source: U.S. Census

=== 2020 census ===
At the 2020 census, the Goldfield census-designated place had a population of 225, living in 124 households, with 202 housing units. All but one resident lived in households. The one exception lived in institutional group quarters. The average household size was 1.81 people.

The racial makeup was 90.7% (204) White, 0.9% (2) Black or African American, 0.9% (2) Native American or Alaska Native, 0.9% (2) Asian, and 6.7% (15) from two or more races. No residents reported being Pacific Islander or "some other race" alone. Hispanic or Latino residents of any race made up 5.8% (13) of the population. Non-Hispanic Whites made up 88.4% (199).

The median age was 57.9 years: 61.5 for males and 52.8 for females. About 16.4% of residents were under 18, 3.1% were 18 to 24, 17.8% were 25 to 44, 25.3% were 45 to 64, and 37.3% were 65 or older. The 70 to 74 age group was the largest single five year cohort, at 15.1% of the population. There were 118 males and 107 females, or about 110.3 males for every 100 females. Among adults aged 18 and over, there were about 123.8 males for every 100 females.

Of the 124 households, 30.6% were married couples and 9.7% were cohabiting couples. A further 34.7% had a male householder and 25.0% a female householder with no spouse or partner present. About 21.8% of households included someone under 18, and 47.6% included someone aged 65 or older. People living alone made up 40.3% of households, and 22.6% of households were someone aged 65 or older living alone.

Of the 202 housing units, 124 (61.4%) were occupied and 78 (38.6%) were vacant. Of the vacant units, 23 were held for seasonal, recreational, or occasional use. Of the occupied units, 87.1% (108) were owner-occupied and 12.9% (16) were rented. The homeowner vacancy rate was 1.8% and the rental vacancy rate was 38.5%.

=== 2000 census ===
The 2000 census showed 440 people, 221 households, and 118 families resided in the Goldfield census county division. The racial makeup of the CCD was 93.2% White, 0.2% Black or African American, 2.0% Native American, 0.2% Pacific Islander, 1.4% from other races, and 3.0% from two or more races. About 5.2% of the population was Hispanic or Latino of any race.

== Culture ==
Gun store and shops along U.S. Route 95.

Post office on 4th Street in 2026.

The Goldfield Days festival is held in August each year, featuring parades, booths, historical displays, and a land auction. In 2026, approximately 450 people attended, including locals and visitors, in addition to 25 vendors. Tours of the historic hotel and high school were offered to attendees.

Opened in 2002, the International Car Forest of the Last Church is an art installation spanning approximately 80 acres (32 ha)consisting of partially-buried passenger cars. A separate art installation, the Art Car Park, consists of modified cars installed roadside.

== Education ==
Public education is provided by the Esmeralda County School District for kindergarten through eighth grade. High school students go to Tonopah High School in nearby Tonopah, which is part of the Nye County School District.

== In popular culture ==
Parts of the cult classic 1971 car chase movie Vanishing Point were filmed in Goldfield, and it was the site of the fictitious radio station "KOW", and the DJ "Super-Soul".

Parts of Goldfield, and also parts of nearby Tonopah, served as the fictional town of Baxter, California, in the 1998 film Desert Blue.

The town was featured in two episodes of State Trooper, Rod Cameron's syndicated television series that aired from 1956 to 1959.

In the 1988 movie Cherry 2000, Goldfield was used as the set of the fictional town of Glory Hole.

The 1995 movie The Stranger was filmed in and around Goldfield.

An abbreviated depiction of Goldfield is featured in the video game American Truck Simulator.

== Notable people ==
- Ben Alexander, actor
- Doris Dawson, actress
- Brad Dexter, actor
- Virgil Earp, deputy sheriff
- Joseph Rosenberg, banker and miner
- George Wingfield, banker and miner

== See also ==
- Goldfield Hills
- Tonopah and Goldfield Railroad
- Tonopah and Tidewater Railroad
