= 1904 United States presidential election in Nevada =

- November 8, 1904
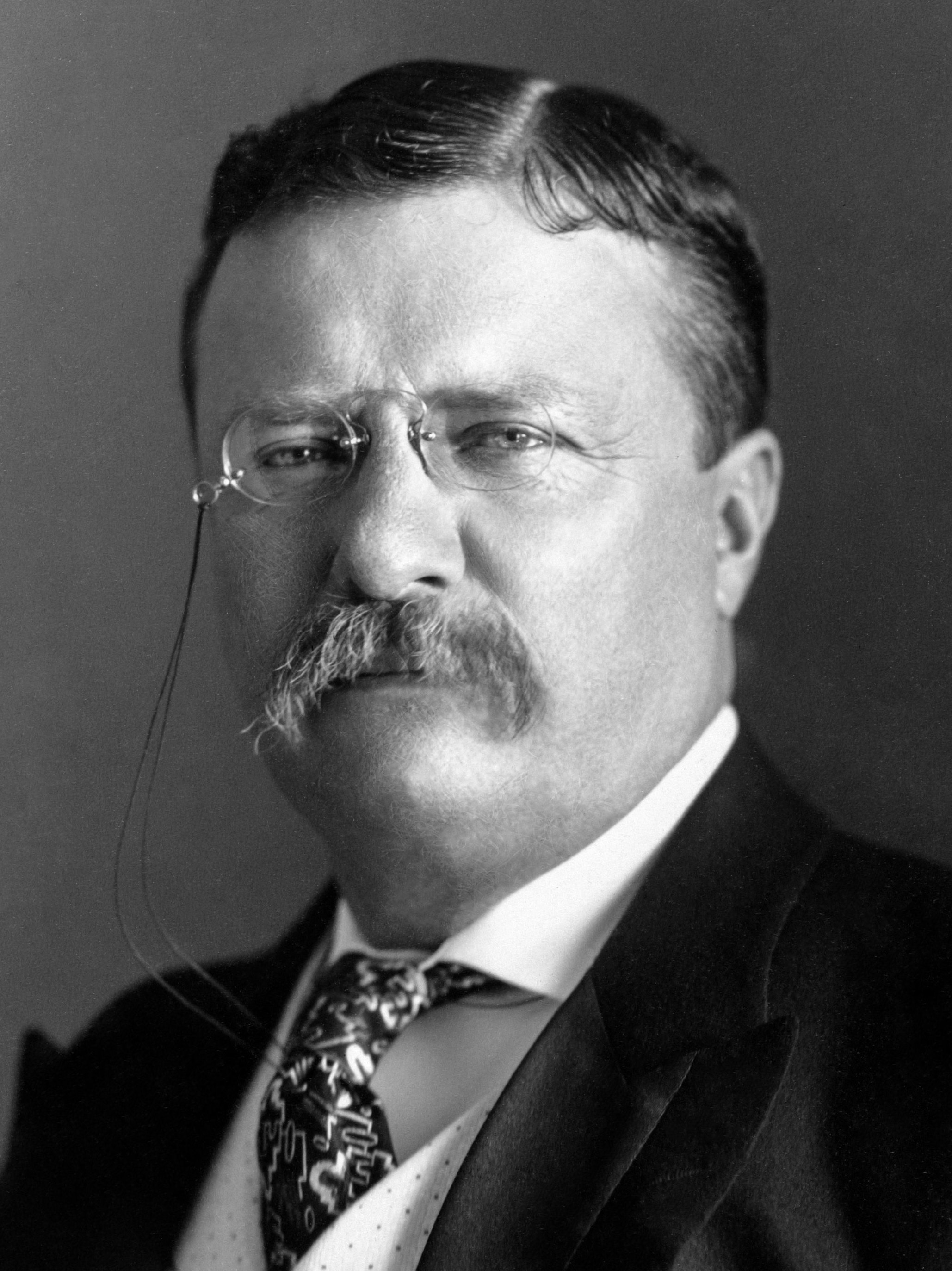

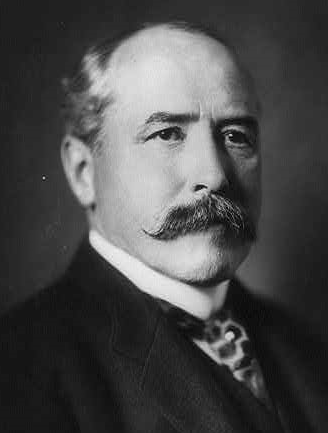

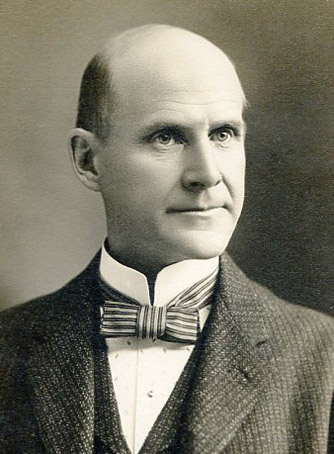
Nominee	Theodore Roosevelt	Alton B. Parker	Eugene V. Debs
Party	Republican	Democratic	Socialist
Alliance		Silver
Home state	New York	New York	Indiana
Running mate	Charles W. Fairbanks	Henry G. Davis	Ben Hanford
Electoral vote	3	0	0
Popular vote	6,864	3,982	925
Percentage	56.66%	32.87%	7.64%
County results
Roosevelt
40–50%
50–60%
60–70%
President before election
Theodore Roosevelt
Republican
Elected President
Theodore Roosevelt
Republican

The 1904 United States presidential election in Nevada took place on November 8, 1904, as part of the 1904 United States presidential election. Voters chose three representatives, or electors to the Electoral College, who voted for president and vice president.

Nevada was won by the Republican ticket of incumbent President Theodore Roosevelt of New York and his running mate Senator Charles W. Fairbanks of Indiana. They defeated the Democratic nominees, former Chief Judge of New York Court of Appeals Alton B. Parker and his running mate, former US Senator Henry G. Davis of West Virginia.

Roosevelt and Fairbanks would win the state by a margin of 23.79%, roughly mirroring the results of the national popular vote. After the state had voted overwhelmingly for James B. Weaver and William Jennings Bryan during the three previous elections, Roosevelt claimed the state for the Republican Party for the only time between 1888 and 1920.

Roosevelt won every county in the state, becoming the first Republican presidential candidate to do so; this has since only been repeated by Richard Nixon in 1972, Ronald Reagan in 1980 and 1984, and George H.W. Bush in 1988. This election was the first time since its establishment in 1866 that Lincoln County backed a Republican candidate. Additionally, Humboldt County voted for a Republican for the first time since 1872.

Following this election, Nevada would eventually become a bellwether that has reflected the result in 26 of the 29 presidential elections since (the exceptions were in 1908, 1976 and 2016).

== Results ==
General Election Results
Party	Pledged to	Elector	Votes
Republican Party	Theodore Roosevelt	C. A. Ahern	6,864
Republican Party	Theodore Roosevelt	James L. Butler	6,850
Republican Party	Theodore Roosevelt	W. L. Plumb	6,768
Democratic Party & Silver Party	Alton B. Parker	E. W. Clark	3,982
Democratic Party & Silver Party	Alton B. Parker	Zeb Kendall	3,982
Democratic Party & Silver Party	Alton B. Parker	A. W. Hesson	3,947
Socialist Party	Eugene V. Debs	William H. Cordill	925
Socialist Party	Eugene V. Debs	A. B. Anderson	924
Socialist Party	Eugene V. Debs	V. L. Rose	909
Stalwart Silver Party	Thomas E. Watson	H. P. Beck	344
Stalwart Silver Party	Thomas E. Watson	J. M. McCormack	328
Stalwart Silver Party	Thomas E. Watson	J. B. McCullough	326
Votes cast (Note: Based on totals for highest elector on each ticket)			12,115

=== Results by county ===
County	Theodore Roosevelt Republican		Alton Brooks Parker Democratic & Silver		Eugene Victor Debs Socialist		Thomas Edward Watson Stalwart Silver		Margin		Total votes cast (Note: Based on highest elector on each ticket)
County	#	%	#	%	#	%	#	%	#	%	Total votes cast
Churchill	185	49.47%	165	44.12%	14	3.74%	10	2.67%	20	5.35%	374
Douglas	262	68.59%	112	29.32%	2	0.52%	6	1.57%	150	39.27%	382
Elko	718	54.07%	508	38.25%	69	5.20%	33	2.48%	210	15.81%	1,328
Esmeralda	490	42.20%	380	32.73%	273	23.51%	18	1.55%	110	9.47%	1,161
Eureka	235	62.50%	107	28.46%	5	1.33%	29	7.71%	128	34.04%	376
Humboldt	610	57.44%	356	33.52%	64	6.03%	32	3.01%	254	23.92%	1,062
Lander	227	61.85%	93	25.34%	14	3.81%	33	8.99%	134	36.51%	367
Lincoln	405	53.08%	295	38.66%	52	6.82%	11	1.44%	110	14.42%	763
Lyon	392	67.82%	164	28.37%	19	3.29%	3	0.52%	228	39.45%	578
Nye	511	50.74%	389	38.63%	84	8.34%	23	2.28%	122	12.12%	1,007
Ormsby	409	60.15%	218	32.06%	39	5.74%	14	2.06%	191	28.09%	680
Storey	627	61.47%	322	31.57%	28	2.75%	43	4.22%	305	29.90%	1,020
Washoe	1,517	59.44%	721	28.25%	245	9.60%	69	2.70%	796	31.19%	2,552
White Pine	276	59.35%	152	32.69%	17	3.66%	20	4.30%	124	26.67%	465
Totals	6,864	56.66%	3,982	32.87%	925	7.64%	344	2.84%	2,882	23.79%	12,115

==== Counties that flipped from Democratic to Republican ====
- Churchill
- Douglas
- Elko
- Esmeralda
- Eureka
- Humboldt
- Lander
- Lincoln
- Lyon
- Nye
- Ormsby
- Storey
- Washoe
- White Pine

== See also ==
- United States presidential elections in Nevada
