= 1916 United States presidential election in Nevada =

- November 7, 1916

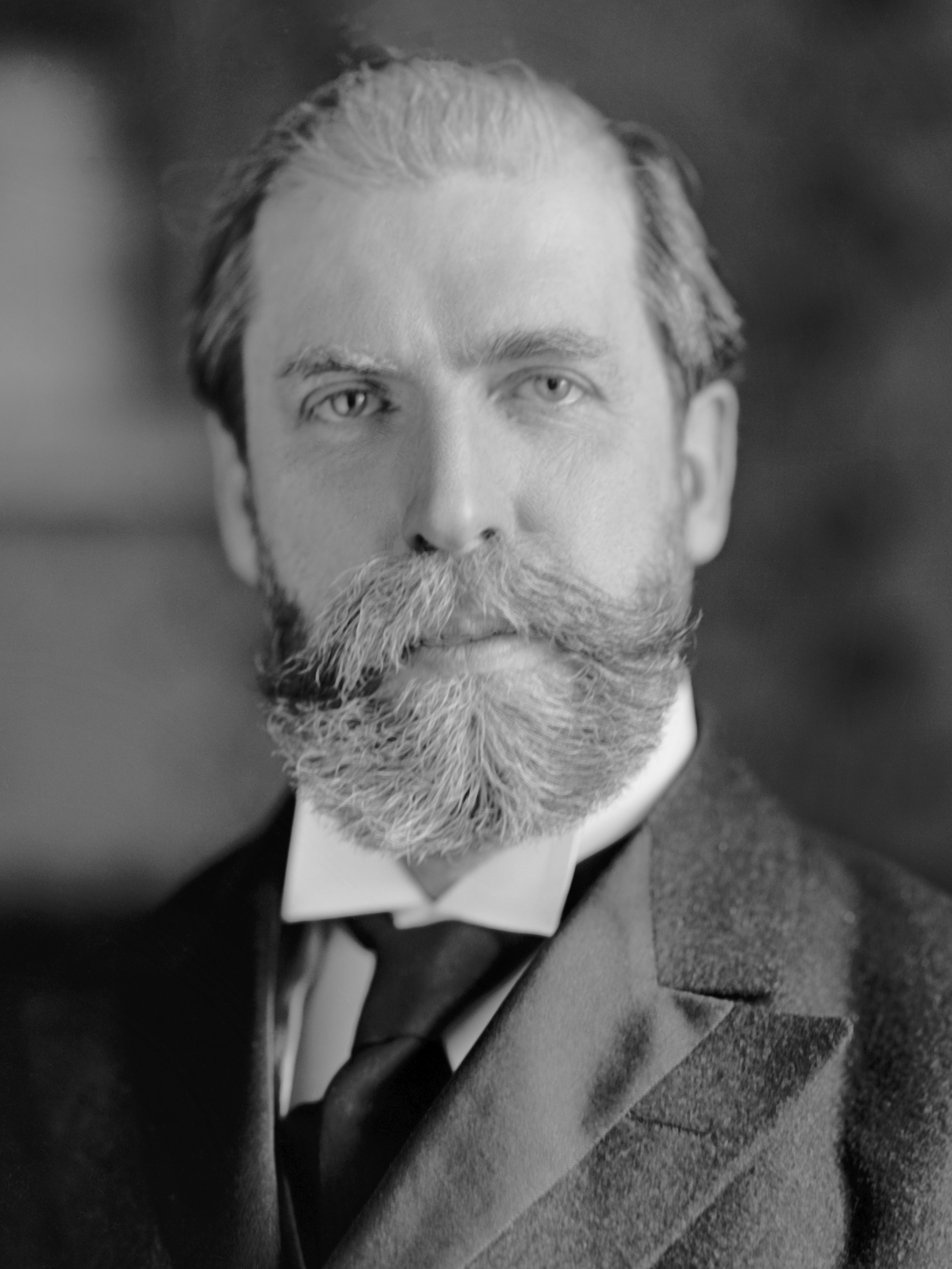

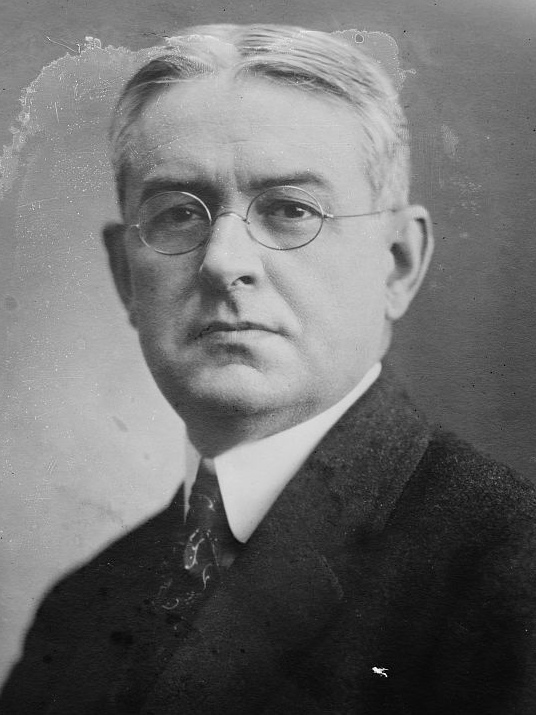
Nominee	Woodrow Wilson	Charles Evans Hughes	Allan L. Benson
Party	Democratic	Republican	Socialist
Home state	New Jersey	New York	New York
Running mate	Thomas R. Marshall	Charles W. Fairbanks	George Ross Kirkpatrick
Electoral vote	3	0	0
Popular vote	17,776	12,127	3,065
Percentage	53.36%	36.40%	9.20%
County results
Wilson
40–50%
50–60%
60–70%
70–80%
Hughes
40–50%
President before election
Woodrow Wilson
Democratic
Elected President
Woodrow Wilson
Democratic

The 1916 United States presidential election in Nevada took place on November 7, 1916, as part of the 1916 United States presidential election. Voters chose three representatives, or electors to the Electoral College, who voted for president and vice president.

Nevada was won by incumbent President of the United States, former Governor of New Jersey Woodrow Wilson, who won the state by a comfortable margin of nearly seventeen points and carried every county in the state except Douglas, a county that since statehood has voted Democratic only for William Jennings Bryan in the "free silver" elections of 1896 and 1900 and for the Franklin Delano Roosevelt landslides of 1932 and 1936. Nevada voted more than 5% more Democratic than the nation as a whole, an anomaly exceeded only by Bryan and Roosevelt in their first two elections each, as well as by Barack Obama in 2008.

== Results ==
General Election Results
Party	Pledged to	Elector	Votes
Democratic Party	Woodrow Wilson	Robert L. Douglass	17,776
Democratic Party	Woodrow Wilson	Joseph L. Earl	17,673
Democratic Party	Woodrow Wilson	James T. Goodin	17,661
Republican Party	Charles Evans Hughes	Walter R. Bracken	12,127
Republican Party	Charles Evans Hughes	P. L. Flanigan	12,082
Republican Party	Charles Evans Hughes	Allen G. McBride	12,068
Socialist Party	Allan Benson	Jud Harris	3,065
Socialist Party	Allan Benson	Mrs. Nellie T. Ziegler	3,038
Socialist Party	Allan Benson	J. E. Rearick	3,032
Prohibition Party	Frank Hanly	George W. Ingalls	348
Prohibition Party	Frank Hanly	Mortimer J. Swander	347
Prohibition Party	Frank Hanly	Ida M. Ashbury	346
Votes cast (Note: Based on totals for highest elector on each ticket)			33,316

=== Results by county ===
County	Thomas Woodrow Wilson Democratic		Charles Evans Hughes Republican		Allan Louis Benson Socialist		James Franklin Hanly Prohibition		Margin		Total votes cast (Note: Based on highest elector on each ticket)
County	#	%	#	%	#	%	#	%	#	%	Total votes cast
Churchill	831	53.51%	531	34.19%	184	11.85%	7	0.45%	300	19.32%	1,553
Clark	1,115	60.17%	529	28.55%	194	10.47%	15	0.81%	586	31.62%	1,853
Douglas	301	43.50%	337	48.70%	43	6.21%	11	1.59%	-36	-5.20%	692
Elko	2,020	60.32%	1,072	32.01%	225	6.72%	32	0.96%	948	28.31%	3,349
Esmeralda	1,135	49.76%	709	31.08%	418	18.33%	19	0.83%	426	18.68%	2,281
Eureka	263	50.58%	239	45.96%	15	2.88%	3	0.58%	24	4.62%	520
Humboldt	1,681	56.03%	1,004	33.47%	291	9.70%	24	0.80%	677	22.56%	3,000
Lander	473	50.81%	321	34.48%	130	13.96%	7	0.75%	152	16.33%	931
Lincoln	634	71.16%	202	22.67%	51	5.72%	4	0.45%	432	48.49%	891
Lyon	769	47.03%	669	40.92%	174	10.64%	23	1.41%	100	6.11%	1,635
Mineral	617	55.69%	385	34.75%	99	8.94%	7	0.63%	232	20.94%	1,108
Nye	1,601	50.50%	1,019	32.15%	536	16.91%	14	0.44%	582	18.35%	3,170
Ormsby	610	49.71%	534	43.52%	63	5.13%	20	1.63%	76	6.19%	1,227
Storey	463	52.61%	403	45.80%	6	0.68%	8	0.91%	60	6.81%	880
Washoe	3,341	47.07%	3,225	45.44%	397	5.59%	135	1.90%	116	1.63%	7,098
White Pine	1,922	61.45%	948	30.31%	239	7.64%	19	0.61%	974	31.14%	3,128
Totals	17,776	53.36%	12,127	36.40%	3,065	9.20%	348	1.04%	5,649	16.96%	33,316

==== Counties that flipped from Progressive to Democratic ====
- Lander

==== Counties that flipped from Progressive to Republican ====
- Douglas

== See also ==
- United States presidential elections in Nevada
