= 1952 United States presidential election in Nevada =

- November 4, 1952

Nominee	Dwight D. Eisenhower	Adlai Stevenson
Party	Republican	Democratic
Home state	New York	Illinois
Running mate	Richard Nixon	John Sparkman
Electoral vote	3	0
Popular vote	50,502	31,688
Percentage	61.45%	38.55%
County results
Eisenhower
50–60%
60–70%
70–80%
80–90%
Stevenson
50–60%
President before election
Harry S. Truman
Democratic
Elected President
Dwight D. Eisenhower
Republican

The 1952 United States presidential election in Nevada took place on November 4, 1952, as part of the 1952 United States presidential election. State voters chose three representatives, or electors, to the Electoral College, who voted for president and vice president.

Nevada was won by Columbia University President Dwight D. Eisenhower (R–New York), running with Senator Richard Nixon, with 61.45% of the popular vote, against Adlai Stevenson (D–Illinois), running with Senator John Sparkman, with 38.55% of the popular vote. Eisenhower's vote share was the highest achieved in Nevada by any Republican presidential candidate to that point, although Richard Nixon in 1972 and Ronald Reagan in 1980 and 1984 would eventually exceed Eisenhower's 61.45% vote share. This was the last time that Clark County, home to Las Vegas, did not cast the most votes of any county in a presidential election in Nevada.

== Results ==
1952 United States presidential election in Nevada
Party	Candidate	Votes	%
Republican	Dwight D. Eisenhower	50,502	61.45%
Democratic	Adlai Stevenson	31,688	38.55%
Total votes		82,190	100%

=== Results by county ===
County	Dwight D. Eisenhower Republican		Adlai Stevenson Democratic		Margin		Total votes cast
County	#	%	#	%	#	%	Total votes cast
Churchill	1,948	68.33%	903	31.67%	1,045	36.66%	2,851
Clark	13,333	52.93%	11,855	47.07%	1,478	5.86%	25,188
Douglas	948	84.27%	177	15.73%	771	68.54%	1,125
Elko	3,104	63.88%	1,755	36.12%	1,349	27.76%	4,859
Esmeralda	174	55.59%	139	44.41%	35	11.18%	313
Eureka	379	70.71%	157	29.29%	222	41.42%	536
Humboldt	1,398	66.92%	691	33.08%	707	33.84%	2,089
Lander	501	67.89%	237	32.11%	264	35.78%	738
Lincoln	903	48.97%	941	51.03%	-38	-2.06%	1,844
Lyon	1,453	71.61%	576	28.39%	877	43.22%	2,029
Mineral	1,297	48.65%	1,369	51.35%	-72	-2.70%	2,666
Nye	1,037	64.65%	567	35.35%	470	29.30%	1,604
Ormsby	1,653	74.06%	579	25.94%	1,074	48.12%	2,232
Pershing	919	63.78%	522	36.22%	397	27.56%	1,441
Storey	206	58.03%	149	41.97%	57	16.06%	355
Washoe	19,044	68.18%	8,888	31.82%	10,156	36.36%	27,932
White Pine	2,205	50.25%	2,183	49.75%	22	0.50%	4,388
Totals	50,502	61.45%	31,688	38.55%	18,814	22.90%	82,190

==== Counties that flipped from Democratic to Republican ====
- Clark
- Elko
- Esmeralda
- Pine

== See also ==
- United States presidential elections in Nevada
