= 1984 United States presidential election in Nevada =

- November 6, 1984
- Turnout: 82.61% (of registered voters) ▼47.81% (of eligible voters) ▼

Nominee	Ronald Reagan	Walter Mondale
Party	Republican	Democratic
Home state	California	Minnesota
Running mate	George H. W. Bush	Geraldine Ferraro
Electoral vote	4	0
Popular vote	188,770	91,655
Percentage	65.85%	31.97%
County results
Reagan
50–60%
60–70%
70–80%
President before election
Ronald Reagan
Republican
Elected President
Ronald Reagan
Republican

The 1984 United States presidential election in Nevada took place on November 6, 1984. All 50 states and the District of Columbia, were part of the 1984 United States presidential election. State voters chose four electors to the Electoral College, which selected the president and vice president of the United States.

Nevada was won by incumbent United States president Ronald Reagan of California, who was running against former vice president Walter Mondale of Minnesota. Reagan ran for a second time with incumbent vice president and former C.I.A. director George H. W. Bush of Texas, and Mondale ran with Representative Geraldine Ferraro of New York, the first major female candidate for the vice presidency.

The presidential election of 1984 was a rather partisan election for Nevada, with about 2% of the state voting for third parties, or for Nevada's "None of These Candidates" option. Every county gave Reagan a comfortable majority.

Nevada weighed in for this election as 16% more Republican than the national average. Reagan won Nevada by a resounding landslide margin of 34%. His vote share of 65.9% made it his tenth-best state nationally, and was the highest vote share any nominee of either party had won in Nevada since 1936. The Mountain West as a whole had begun trending Republican in 1952, but Nevada remained more competitive than other states in the region through the 1960s and 1970s, being one of two states in the region (along with New Mexico) to vote for Kennedy in 1960, giving Nixon a plurality in 1968, and voting for Ford by just 4.4% in 1976.

A dramatic shift came with Reagan's candidacy, however, as, in 1980, Nevada gave Reagan nearly as high a vote share as it had given Nixon in his 1972 landslide. Reagan improved his vote share still further in 1984. He carried every county in the state, including the largest county, Clark County (home to Las Vegas), which had typically voted Democratic from its founding in 1909 through 1976. Not only did he carry Clark, but he got a higher vote share in it than he did nationally, becoming the first nominee of either party to crack 60% in the county since 1964. He also won over two-thirds of the vote in the state's second population center, more typically Republican Washoe County (Reno). Only in rural and sparsely settled White Pine County did Reagan fall below 60%, and even here he won by double digits. In eleven counties (including the state's third-largest county equivalent, Carson City), Reagan broke 70%.

Nevada would remain strongly Republican in 1988, but thereafter, it would return to being a more competitive state, as Clark County returned to the Democratic fold in 1992. Bill Clinton won it twice, but by narrow margins; but George W. Bush also won it only by narrow margins in his two elections. No nominee of either party has received as high a vote share in the state as Reagan, as of 2024. This was the only time that a Republican presidential candidate won two terms by carrying all counties in Nevada in both instances.

== Results ==
1984 United States Presidential Election in Nevada
Party	Candidate	Votes	%
Republican	Ronald Reagan (inc.)	188,770	65.85%
Democratic	Walter Mondale	91,655	31.97%
	None of These Candidates	3,950	1.38%
Libertarian	David Bergland	2,292	0.80%
Total votes		286,667	100%

=== Results by county ===
County	Ronald Reagan Republican		Walter Mondale Democratic		None of These Candidates		David Bergland Libertarian		Margin		Total votes cast
County	#	%	#	%	#	%	#	%	#	%	Total votes cast
Carson City	9,477	70.01%	3,790	28.00%	165	1.22%	104	0.77%	5,687	42.01%	13,536
Churchill	4,479	75.53%	1,304	21.99%	103	1.74%	44	0.74%	3,175	53.54%	5,930
Clark	94,133	62.60%	53,386	35.50%	1,866	1.24%	978	0.65%	40,747	27.10%	150,363
Douglas	6,385	75.57%	1,877	22.22%	106	1.25%	81	0.96%	4,508	53.35%	8,449
Elko	5,110	74.48%	1,566	22.82%	105	1.53%	80	1.17%	3,544	51.66%	6,861
Esmeralda	453	70.02%	158	24.42%	19	2.94%	17	2.63%	295	45.60%	647
Eureka	439	75.95%	124	21.45%	9	1.56%	6	1.04%	315	54.50%	578
Humboldt	2,498	72.41%	862	24.99%	52	1.51%	38	1.10%	1,636	47.42%	3,450
Lander	1,222	78.28%	301	19.28%	27	1.73%	11	0.70%	921	59.00%	1,561
Lincoln	1,175	72.71%	397	24.57%	30	1.86%	14	0.87%	778	48.14%	1,616
Lyon	4,320	69.94%	1,673	27.08%	94	1.52%	90	1.46%	2,647	42.86%	6,177
Mineral	1,645	65.69%	766	30.59%	57	2.28%	36	1.44%	879	35.10%	2,504
Nye	3,573	71.62%	1,269	25.44%	84	1.68%	63	1.26%	2,304	46.18%	4,989
Pershing	956	71.88%	333	25.04%	24	1.80%	17	1.28%	623	46.84%	1,330
Storey	570	66.74%	252	29.51%	17	1.99%	15	1.76%	318	37.23%	854
Washoe	50,418	67.67%	22,321	29.96%	1,114	1.50%	658	0.88%	28,097	37.71%	74,511
White Pine	1,917	57.90%	1,276	38.54%	78	2.36%	40	1.21%	641	19.36%	3,311
Totals	188,770	65.85%	91,655	31.97%	3,950	1.38%	2,292	0.80%	97,115	33.88%	286,667

=== By congressional district ===
Reagan won both congressional districts, including one that elected a democrat.

District	Reagan	Mondale	Representative
1st	64%	36%	Harry Reid
2nd	71%	29%	Barbara Vucanovich

== See also ==
- Presidency of Ronald Reagan
- United States presidential elections in Nevada
