= 1880 United States presidential election in Nevada =

- November 2, 1880
- Turnout: 29.46% of the total population ▼16.88 pp
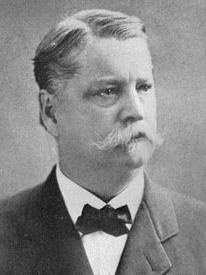

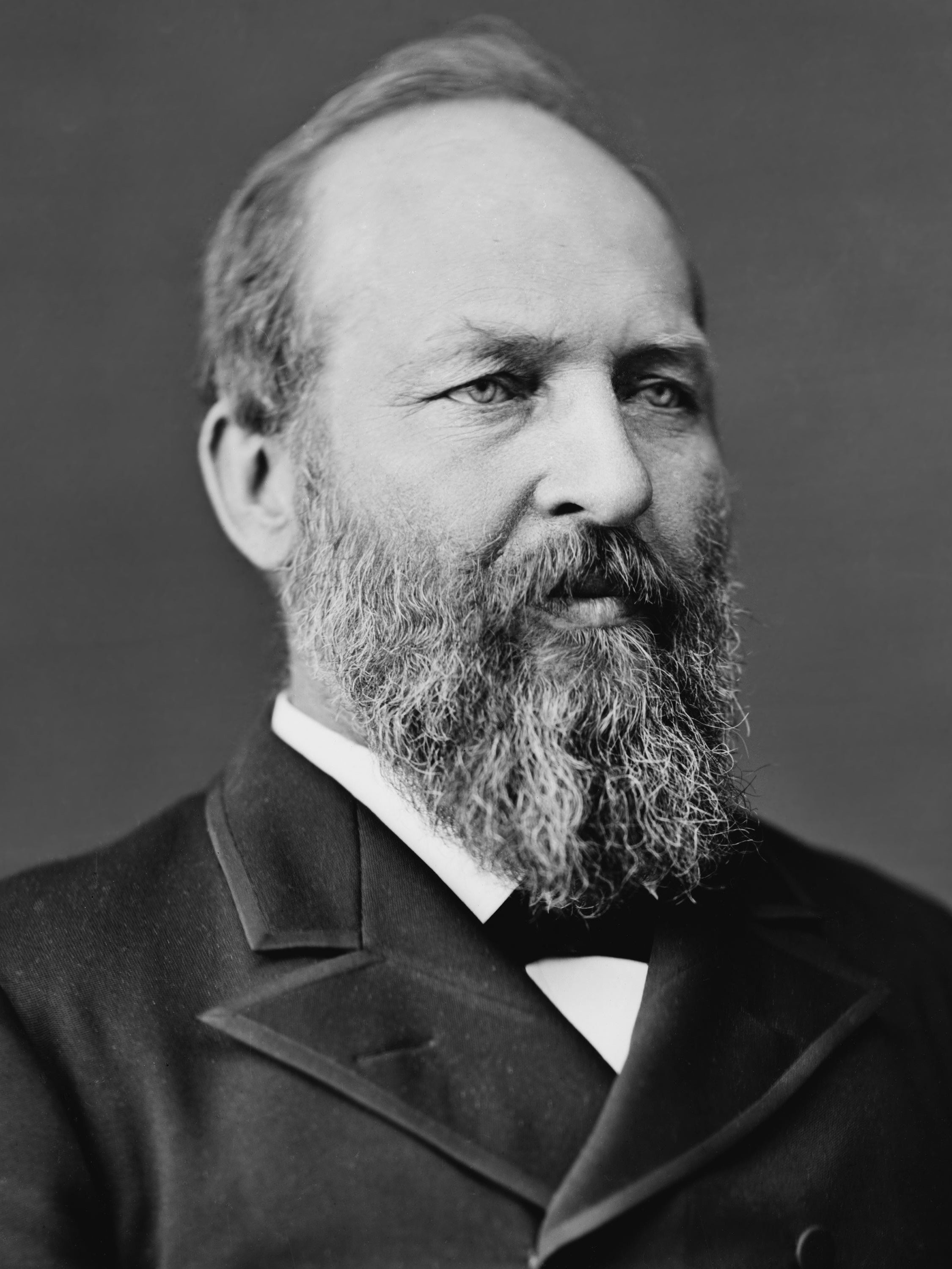
Nominee	Winfield Scott Hancock	James A. Garfield
Party	Democratic	Republican
Home state	Pennsylvania	Ohio
Running mate	William Hayden English	Chester A. Arthur
Electoral vote	3	0
Popular vote	9,613	8,732
Percentage	52.40%	47.60%
County results
Hancock
50–60%
60–70%
Garfield
50–60%
President before election
Rutherford B. Hayes
Republican
Elected President
James Garfield
Republican

The 1880 United States presidential election in Nevada took place on November 2, 1880, as part of the 1880 United States presidential election. State voters chose three representatives, or electors, to the Electoral College, who voted for president and vice president.

Nevada was won by General Winfield Scott Hancock (D–Pennsylvania), running with former Representative William Hayden English, with 52.40% of the popular vote, against Representative James A. Garfield (R-Ohio), running with the 10th chairman of the New York State Republican Executive Committee Chester A. Arthur, with 47.60% of the vote. This was the first time Nevada voted for a Democratic presidential candidate, with Hancock's victory being generally attributed to the fact that Garfield was viewed as weaker than Hancock on the hot-bed issue of controlling immigration from China – which both major parties promised to do and which the Nevada electorate was overwhelmingly in favor of.

This is the first occasion where a Republican won without the state since it was admitted to into the union. This was the first election in which a Democratic candidate carried Douglas County, Storey County, Washoe County, and White Pine County; they would not back a Democrat again until 1896.

== Results ==
General Election Results
Party	Pledged to	Elector	Votes
Democratic Party	Winfield Scott Hancock	W. E. F. Deal	9,613
Democratic Party	Winfield Scott Hancock	John H. Dennis	9,611
Democratic Party	Winfield Scott Hancock	J. C. McTarnahan	9,609
Republican Party	James A. Garfield	O. H. Gray	8,732
Republican Party	James A. Garfield	E. A. Morton	8,732
Republican Party	James A. Garfield	R. H. Taylor	8,725
Votes cast (Note: Based on totals for highest elector on each ticket)			18,345

=== Results by county ===
	Winfield Scott Hancock Democratic		James Abram Garfield Republican		Margin		Total votes cast (Note: Based on highest elector on each ticket)
County	#	%	#	%	#	%	Total votes cast
Churchill	99	54.70%	82	45.30%	17	9.39%	181
Douglas	275	52.68%	247	47.32%	28	5.36%	522
Elko	885	53.09%	782	46.91%	103	6.18%	1,667
Esmeralda	670	52.47%	607	47.53%	63	4.93%	1,277
Eureka	891	46.48%	1,026	53.52%	-135	-7.04%	1,917
Humboldt	598	61.65%	372	38.35%	226	23.30%	970
Lander	576	52.80%	515	47.20%	61	5.59%	1,091
Lincoln	419	61.98%	257	38.02%	162	23.96%	676
Lyon	295	45.38%	355	54.62%	-60	-9.23%	650
Nye	418	55.22%	339	44.78%	79	10.44%	757
Ormsby	452	42.01%	624	57.99%	-172	-15.99%	1,076
Storey	2,766	53.82%	2,373	46.18%	393	7.65%	5,139
Washoe	828	52.31%	755	47.69%	73	4.61%	1,583
White Pine	441	52.56%	398	47.44%	43	5.13%	839
Totals	9,613	52.40%	8,732	47.60%	881	4.80%	18,345

==== Counties that flipped from Republican to Democratic ====
- Douglas
- Storey
- Washoe
- White Pine

== See also ==
- United States presidential elections in Nevada
