= United States presidential elections in Nevada =

Presidential elections in Nevada
- Number of elections: 41
- Voted Democratic: 19
- Voted Republican: 21
- Voted other: 1 (Note: James B. Weaver, 1892.)
- Voted for winning candidate: 33
- Voted for losing candidate: 8

The following is a table of United States presidential elections in Nevada, ordered by year. Since its admission to statehood in 1864, Nevada has participated in every U.S. presidential election. Since New Mexico's statehood in 1912, Nevada has voted for the same candidate as New Mexico in all presidential elections except for 2000 and in 2024. Since 1912, Nevada has voted for the eventual winner of the presidential election with only two exceptions: 1976 and 2016.

Winners of the state are in bold, and shaded in the party of the state winner.

View source data.

| Year | Winner (nationally) | Votes | Percent | Runner-up (nationally) | Votes | Percent | Other national candidates (Note: For purposes of these lists, other national candidates are defined as those who won at least one electoral vote, or won at least ten percent of the vote in multiple states.) | Votes | Percent | Electoral votes | Notes |
|---|---|---|---|---|---|---|---|---|---|---|---|
| 2024 | **Donald Trump** | 751,205 | 50.59 | Kamala Harris | 705,197 | 47.49 | — | | | 6 | |
| 2020 | **Joe Biden** | 703,486 | 50.06 | Donald Trump | 669,890 | 47.67 | — | | | 6 | |
| 2016 | Donald Trump (Note: Won the electoral college while losing the popular vote) | 512,058 | 45.50 | **Hillary Clinton** | 539,260 | 47.92 | — | | | 6 | |
| 2012 | **Barack Obama** | 531,373 | 52.36 | Mitt Romney | 463,567 | 45.68 | — | | | 6 | |
| 2008 | **Barack Obama** | 533,736 | 55.15 | John McCain | 412,827 | 42.65 | — | | | 5 | |
| 2004 | **George W. Bush** | 418,690 | 50.47 | John Kerry | 397,190 | 47.88 | — | | | 5 | |
| 2000 | **George W. Bush** | 301,575 | 49.52 | Al Gore | 279,978 | 45.98 | — | | | 4 | |
| 1996 | **Bill Clinton** | 203,974 | 43.93 | Bob Dole | 199,244 | 42.91 | Ross Perot | 43,986 | 9.47 | 4 | |
| 1992 | **Bill Clinton** | 189,148 | 37.36 | George H. W. Bush | 175,828 | 34.73 | Ross Perot | 132,580 | 26.19 | 4 | |
| 1988 | **George H. W. Bush** | 206,040 | 58.86 | Michael Dukakis | 132,738 | 37.92 | — | | | 4 | |
| 1984 | **Ronald Reagan** | 188,770 | 65.85 | Walter Mondale | 91,655 | 31.97 | — | | | 4 | |
| 1980 | **Ronald Reagan** | 155,017 | 62.54 | Jimmy Carter | 66,666 | 26.89 | John B. Anderson | 17,651 | 7.12 | 3 | |
| 1976 | Jimmy Carter | 92,479 | 45.81 | **Gerald Ford** | 101,273 | 50.17 | — | | | 3 | |
| 1972 | **Richard Nixon** | 115,750 | 63.68 | George McGovern | 66,016 | 36.32 | — | | | 3 | |
| 1968 | **Richard Nixon** | 73,188 | 47.46 | Hubert Humphrey | 60,598 | 39.29 | George Wallace | 20,432 | 13.25 | 3 | |
| 1964 | **Lyndon B. Johnson** | 79,339 | 58.58 | Barry Goldwater | 56,094 | 41.42 | — | | | 3 | |
| 1960 | **John F. Kennedy** | 54,880 | 51.16 | Richard Nixon | 52,387 | 48.84 | — | | | 3 | |
| 1956 | **Dwight D. Eisenhower** | 56,049 | 57.97 | Adlai Stevenson II | 40,640 | 42.03 | T. Coleman Andrews/ Unpledged Electors (Note: Was allied with a slate of unpledged electors in Louisiana, Mississippi and South Carolina) | — | — | 3 | |
| 1952 | **Dwight D. Eisenhower** | 50,502 | 61.45 | Adlai Stevenson II | 31,688 | 38.55 | — | | | 3 | |
| 1948 | **Harry S. Truman** | 31,291 | 50.37 | Thomas E. Dewey | 29,357 | 47.26 | Strom Thurmond | — | — | 3 | |
| 1944 | **Franklin D. Roosevelt** | 29,623 | 54.62 | Thomas E. Dewey | 24,611 | 45.38 | — | | | 3 | |
| 1940 | **Franklin D. Roosevelt** | 31,945 | 60.08 | Wendell Willkie | 21,229 | 39.92 | — | | | 3 | |
| 1936 | **Franklin D. Roosevelt** | 31,925 | 72.81 | Alf Landon | 11,923 | 27.19 | — | | | 3 | |
| 1932 | **Franklin D. Roosevelt** | 28,756 | 69.41 | Herbert Hoover | 12,674 | 30.59 | — | | | 3 | |
| 1928 | **Herbert Hoover** | 18,327 | 56.54 | Al Smith | 14,090 | 43.46 | — | | | 3 | |
| 1924 | **Calvin Coolidge** | 11,243 | 41.76 | John W. Davis | 5,909 | 21.95 | Robert M. La Follette | 9,769 | 36.29 | 3 | |
| 1920 | **Warren G. Harding** | 15,479 | 56.92 | James M. Cox | 9,851 | 36.22 | Parley P. Christensen | — | — | 3 | |
| 1916 | **Woodrow Wilson** | 17,776 | 53.36 | Charles E. Hughes | 12,127 | 36.4 | — | | | 3 | |
| 1912 | **Woodrow Wilson** | 7,986 | 39.7 | Theodore Roosevelt | 5,620 | 27.94 | William H. Taft | 3,196 | 15.89 | 3 | |
| 1908 | William H. Taft | 10,775 | 43.93 | **William Jennings Bryan** | 11,212 | 45.71 | — | | | 3 | |
| 1904 | **Theodore Roosevelt** | 6,864 | 56.66 | Alton B. Parker | 3,982 | 32.87 | — | | | 3 | |
| 1900 | William McKinley | 3,849 | 37.75 | **William Jennings Bryan** | 6,347 | 62.25 | — | | | 3 | |
| 1896 | William McKinley | 1,938 | 18.79 | **William Jennings Bryan** | 8,376 | 81.21 | — | | | 3 | |
| 1892 | Grover Cleveland | 714 | 6.56 | Benjamin Harrison | 2,811 | 25.84 | **James B. Weaver** | 7,264 | 66.78 | 3 | |
| 1888 | **Benjamin Harrison** | 7,088 | 57.73 | Grover Cleveland | 5,149 | 41.94 | — | | | 3 | |
| 1884 | Grover Cleveland | 5,578 | 43.59 | **James G. Blaine** | 7,193 | 56.21 | — | | | 3 | |
| 1880 | James A. Garfield | 8,732 | 47.60 | **Winfield S. Hancock** | 9,613 | 52.40 | James B. Weaver | — | — | 3 | |
| 1876 | **Rutherford B. Hayes** | 10,383 | 52.73 | Samuel J. Tilden | 9,308 | 47.27 | — | | | 3 | |
| 1872 | **Ulysses S. Grant** | 8,413 | 57.43 | Horace Greeley | 6,236 | 42.57 | — | | | 3 | |
| 1868 | **Ulysses S. Grant** | 6,474 | 55.40 | Horatio Seymour | 5,215 | 44.60 | — | | | 3 | |
| 1864 | **Abraham Lincoln** | 9,826 | 59.80 | George B. McClellan | 6,594 | 40.20 | — | | | 3 | One elector did not vote. |

== See also ==
- Elections in Nevada
