= 1944 United States presidential election in Nevada =

- November 7, 1944

Nominee	Franklin D. Roosevelt	Thomas E. Dewey
Party	Democratic	Republican
Home state	New York	New York
Running mate	Harry S. Truman	John W. Bricker
Electoral vote	3	0
Popular vote	29,623	24,611
Percentage	54.62%	45.38%
County results
Roosevelt
50–60%
60–70%
70–80%
Dewey
50–60%
60–70%
President before election
Franklin D. Roosevelt
Democratic
Elected President
Franklin D. Roosevelt
Democratic

The 1944 United States presidential election in Nevada took place on November 7, 1944, as part of the 1944 United States presidential election. State voters chose three representatives, or electors, to the Electoral College, who voted for president and vice president.

Nevada was won by incumbent President Franklin D. Roosevelt (D–New York), running with Senator Harry S. Truman, with 54.62% of the popular vote, against Governor Thomas E. Dewey (R–New York), running with Governor John W. Bricker, with 45.38% of the popular vote.

== Results ==
General Election Results
Party	Pledged to	Elector	Votes
Democratic Party	Franklin D. Roosevelt	Richard Kirman	29,623
Democratic Party	Franklin D. Roosevelt	Arthur A. Phillips	29,623
Democratic Party	Franklin D. Roosevelt	Mrs. H. W. Sawyer	29,623
Republican Party	Thomas E. Dewey	Newton Crumley Sr.	24,611
Republican Party	Thomas E. Dewey	A. L. Riddle	24,611
Republican Party	Thomas E. Dewey	Margaret Ross	24,611
Votes cast (Note: Based on totals for highest elector on each ticket)			54,234

=== Results by county ===
County	Franklin Delano Roosevelt Democratic		Thomas Edmund Dewey Republican		Margin		Total votes cast
County	#	%	#	%	#	%	Total votes cast
Churchill	1,046	48.07%	1,130	51.93%	-84	-3.86%	2,176
Clark	7,350	61.80%	4,543	38.20%	2,807	23.60%	11,893
Douglas	282	33.65%	556	66.35%	-274	-32.70%	838
Elko	2,280	58.13%	1,642	41.87%	638	16.27%	3,922
Esmeralda	223	59.79%	150	40.21%	73	19.57%	373
Eureka	217	40.64%	317	59.36%	-100	-18.73%	534
Humboldt	994	54.35%	835	45.65%	159	8.69%	1,829
Lander	383	47.40%	425	52.60%	-42	-5.20%	808
Lincoln	1,295	71.19%	524	28.81%	771	42.39%	1,819
Lyon	708	44.17%	895	55.83%	-187	-11.67%	1,603
Mineral	1,344	64.15%	751	35.85%	593	28.31%	2,095
Nye	943	56.60%	723	43.40%	220	13.21%	1,666
Ormsby	665	44.16%	841	55.84%	-176	-11.69%	1,506
Pershing	524	49.34%	538	50.66%	-14	-1.32%	1,062
Storey	173	51.49%	163	48.51%	10	2.98%	336
Washoe	8,384	48.16%	9,024	51.84%	-640	-3.68%	17,408
White Pine	2,812	64.41%	1,554	35.59%	1,258	28.81%	4,366
Totals	29,623	54.62%	24,611	45.38%	5,012	9.24%	54,234

==== Counties that flipped from Democratic to Republican ====
- Churchill
- Eureka
- Lander
- Lyon
- Ormsby
- Pershing
- Washoe

== See also ==
- United States presidential elections in Nevada
