= 1932 United States presidential election in Nevada =

- November 8, 1932

Nominee	Franklin D. Roosevelt	Herbert Hoover
Party	Democratic	Republican
Home state	New York	California
Running mate	John Nance Garner	Charles Curtis
Electoral vote	3	0
Popular vote	28,756	12,674
Percentage	69.41%	30.59%
County results
Roosevelt
50–60%
60–70%
70–80%
80–90%
President before election
Herbert Hoover
Republican
Elected President
Franklin D. Roosevelt
Democratic

The 1932 United States presidential election in Nevada took place on November 8, 1932, as part of the 1932 United States presidential election. State voters chose three representatives, or electors, to the Electoral College, who voted for president and vice president.

Nevada was won by Governor Franklin D. Roosevelt (D–New York), running with Speaker John Nance Garner, with 69.41% of the popular vote, against incumbent President Herbert Hoover (R–California), running with Vice President Charles Curtis, with 30.59% of the popular vote. Roosevelt carried all 17 counties in Nevada, including Douglas County which had not voted for a Democrat since 1900.

== Results ==
General Election Results
Party	Pledged to	Elector	Votes
Democratic Party	Franklin D. Roosevelt	Edward W. Clark	28,756
Democratic Party	Franklin D. Roosevelt	Frances Friedhoff	28,690
Democratic Party	Franklin D. Roosevelt	A. W. Hesson	28,527
Republican Party	Herbert Hoover	Allen Rives	12,674
Republican Party	Herbert Hoover	H. U. Castle	12,622
Republican Party	Herbert Hoover	W. H. Moffat	12,622
Votes cast (Note: Based on totals for highest elector on each ticket)			41,430

=== Results by county ===
County	Franklin Delano Roosevelt Democratic		Herbert Clark Hoover Republican		Margin		Total votes cast (Note: Based on highest elector on each ticket)
County	#	%	#	%	#	%	Total votes cast
Churchill	1,518	69.25%	674	30.75%	844	38.50%	2,192
Clark	5,837	81.25%	1,347	18.75%	4,490	62.50%	7,184
Douglas	398	54.60%	331	45.40%	67	9.19%	729
Elko	2,562	65.91%	1,325	34.09%	1,237	31.82%	3,887
Esmeralda	426	74.35%	147	25.65%	279	48.69%	573
Eureka	385	73.90%	136	26.10%	249	47.79%	521
Humboldt	1,126	73.55%	405	26.45%	721	47.09%	1,531
Lander	536	66.34%	272	33.66%	264	32.67%	808
Lincoln	1,105	78.93%	295	21.07%	810	57.86%	1,400
Lyon	983	68.31%	456	31.69%	527	36.62%	1,439
Mineral	647	73.11%	238	26.89%	409	46.21%	885
Nye	1,296	71.92%	506	28.08%	790	43.84%	1,802
Ormsby	579	54.37%	486	45.63%	93	8.73%	1,065
Pershing	792	76.23%	247	23.77%	545	52.45%	1,039
Storey	247	66.58%	124	33.42%	123	33.15%	371
Washoe	8,141	65.26%	4,333	34.74%	3,808	30.53%	12,474
White Pine	2,178	61.70%	1,352	38.30%	826	23.40%	3,530
Totals	28,756	69.41%	12,674	30.59%	16,082	38.82%	41,430

==== Counties that flipped from Republican to Democratic ====
- Churchill
- Clark
- Douglas
- Elko
- Humboldt
- Lander
- Lincoln
- Lyon
- Ormsby
- Pershing
- Washoe
- White Pine

== See also ==
- United States presidential elections in Nevada
