= 1928 United States presidential election in Nevada =

- November 6, 1928

Nominee	Herbert Hoover	Al Smith
Party	Republican	Democratic
Home state	California	New York
Running mate	Charles Curtis	Joseph Taylor Robinson
Electoral vote	3	0
Popular vote	18,327	14,090
Percentage	56.54%	43.46%
County results
Hoover
50–60%
70–80%
Smith
50–60%
President before election
Calvin Coolidge
Republican
Elected President
Herbert Hoover
Republican

The 1928 United States presidential election in Nevada took place on November 6, 1928, as part of the 1928 United States presidential election. State voters chose three representatives, or electors, to the Electoral College, who voted for president and vice president.

Nevada was won by former Secretary of Commerce Herbert Hoover (R–California), running with Senator Charles Curtis, with 56.54% of the popular vote, against Governor Al Smith (D–New York), running with Senator Joseph Taylor Robinson, with 43.46% of the popular vote.

== Results ==
General Election Results
Party	Pledged to	Elector	Votes
Republican Party	Herbert Hoover	Noble H. Getchell	18,327
Republican Party	Herbert Hoover	W. H. Moffat	18,291
Republican Party	Herbert Hoover	Andrew L. Haight	18,261
Democratic Party	Al Smith	Horace A. Agee	14,090
Democratic Party	Al Smith	Earl W. Nungesser	14,054
Democratic Party	Al Smith	Ray Staley	14,036
Votes cast (Note: Based on totals for highest elector on each ticket)			32,417

=== Results by county ===
County	Herbert Clark Hoover Republican		Alfred Emmanuel Smith Democratic		Margin		Total votes cast (Note: Based on highest elector on each ticket)
County	#	%	#	%	#	%	Total votes cast
Churchill	1,126	59.99%	751	40.01%	375	19.98%	1,877
Clark	1,284	56.61%	984	43.39%	300	13.23%	2,268
Douglas	456	71.03%	186	28.97%	270	42.06%	642
Elko	1,876	56.54%	1,442	43.46%	434	13.08%	3,318
Esmeralda	305	47.21%	341	52.79%	-36	-5.57%	646
Eureka	251	49.02%	261	50.98%	-10	-1.95%	512
Humboldt	783	56.53%	602	43.47%	181	13.07%	1,385
Lander	456	59.22%	314	40.78%	142	18.44%	770
Lincoln	553	50.50%	542	49.50%	11	1.00%	1,095
Lyon	927	56.84%	704	43.16%	223	13.67%	1,631
Mineral	275	45.76%	326	54.24%	-51	-8.49%	601
Nye	958	46.04%	1,123	53.96%	-165	-7.93%	2,081
Ormsby	590	58.07%	426	41.93%	164	16.14%	1,016
Pershing	543	54.57%	452	45.43%	91	9.15%	995
Storey	185	40.57%	271	59.43%	-86	-18.86%	456
Washoe	5,767	59.34%	3,952	40.66%	1,815	18.67%	9,719
White Pine	1,992	58.50%	1,413	41.50%	579	17.00%	3,405
Totals	18,327	56.54%	14,090	43.46%	4,237	13.07%	32,417

==== Counties that flipped from Independent to Democratic ====
- Esmeralda
- Mineral
- Nye

==== Counties that flipped from Republican to Democratic ====
- Eureka
- Storey

==== Counties that flipped from Democratic to Republican ====
- Clark

== See also ==
- United States presidential elections in Nevada
