= 1940 United States presidential election in Nevada =

- November 5, 1940

Nominee	Franklin D. Roosevelt	Wendell Willkie
Party	Democratic	Republican
Home state	New York	New York
Running mate	Henry A. Wallace	Charles L. McNary
Electoral vote	3	0
Popular vote	31,945	21,229
Percentage	60.08%	39.92%
County results
Roosevelt
50–60%
60–70%
70–80%
Willkie
60–70%
President before election
Franklin D. Roosevelt
Democratic
Elected President
Franklin D. Roosevelt
Democratic

The 1940 United States presidential election in Nevada took place on November 5, 1940, as part of the 1940 United States presidential election. State voters chose three representatives, or electors, to the Electoral College, who voted for president and vice president.

Nevada was won by incumbent President Franklin D. Roosevelt (D–New York), running with Secretary Henry A. Wallace, with 60.08% of the popular vote, against Wendell Willkie (R–New York), running with Minority Leader Charles L. McNary, with 39.92% of the popular vote. As of the 2024 presidential election, this is the last election in which Lyon County and Churchill County voted for a Democratic presidential candidate.

== Results ==
General Election Results
Party	Pledged to	Elector	Votes
Democratic Party	Franklin D. Roosevelt	Ruth C. Ruddell	31,945
Democratic Party	Franklin D. Roosevelt	C. W. Springer	31,945
Democratic Party	Franklin D. Roosevelt	Joseph A. Wallace	31,945
Republican Party	Wendell Willkie	Mark Bradshaw	21,229
Republican Party	Wendell Willkie	N. H. Chapin	21,229
Republican Party	Wendell Willkie	Edward F. Lunsford	21,229
Votes cast (Note: Based on totals for highest elector on each ticket)			53,174

=== Results by county ===
County	Franklin Delano Roosevelt Democratic		Wendell Lewis Willkie Republican		Margin		Total votes cast
County	#	%	#	%	#	%	Total votes cast
Churchill	1,267	51.97%	1,171	48.03%	96	3.94%	2,438
Clark	5,154	70.37%	2,170	29.63%	2,984	40.74%	7,324
Douglas	330	35.79%	592	64.21%	-262	-28.42%	922
Elko	3,016	62.85%	1,783	37.15%	1,233	25.69%	4,799
Esmeralda	639	68.64%	292	31.36%	347	37.27%	931
Eureka	353	55.42%	284	44.58%	69	10.83%	637
Humboldt	1,367	63.40%	789	36.60%	378	26.80%	1,956
Lander	475	54.72%	393	45.28%	82	9.45%	868
Lincoln	1,601	77.64%	461	22.36%	1,140	55.29%	2,062
Lyon	1,067	52.56%	963	47.44%	104	5.12%	2,030
Mineral	693	63.06%	406	36.94%	287	26.11%	1,099
Nye	1,206	62.33%	729	37.67%	477	24.65%	1,935
Ormsby	785	51.21%	748	48.79%	37	2.41%	1,533
Pershing	696	53.95%	594	46.05%	102	7.91%	1,290
Storey	382	63.04%	224	36.96%	158	26.07%	606
Washoe	9,243	53.41%	8,062	46.59%	1,181	6.82%	17,305
White Pine	3,671	70.07%	1,568	29.93%	2,103	40.14%	5,239
Totals	31,945	60.08%	21,229	39.92%	10,516	19.85%	52,974

==== Counties that flipped from Democratic to Republican ====
- Douglas

== See also ==
- United States presidential elections in Nevada
