= 1956 United States presidential election in Nevada =

- November 6, 1956

Nominee	Dwight D. Eisenhower	Adlai Stevenson
Party	Republican	Democratic
Home state	Pennsylvania (Note: Although he was born in Texas and grew up in Kansas before his military career, at the time of the 1952 election Eisenhower was president of Columbia University and was, officially, a resident of New York. During his first term as president, he moved his private residence to Gettysburg, Pennsylvania, and officially changed his residency to Pennsylvania.)	Illinois
Running mate	Richard Nixon	Estes Kefauver
Electoral vote	3	0
Popular vote	56,049	40,640
Percentage	57.97%	42.03%
County results
Eisenhower
50–60%
60–70%
80–90%
Stevenson
50–60%
President before election
Dwight D. Eisenhower
Republican
Elected President
Dwight D. Eisenhower
Republican

The 1956 United States presidential election in Nevada took place on November 6, 1956, as part of the 1956 United States presidential election. State voters chose three representatives, or electors, to the Electoral College, who voted for president and vice president.

Nevada was won by incumbent President Dwight D. Eisenhower (R–Pennsylvania), running with Vice President Richard Nixon, with 57.97% of the popular vote, against Adlai Stevenson (D–Illinois), running with Senator Estes Kefauver, with 42.03% of the popular vote.

== Results ==
1956 United States presidential election in Nevada
Party	Candidate	Votes	%
Republican	Dwight D. Eisenhower (inc.)	56,049	57.97%
Democratic	Adlai Stevenson	40,640	42.03%
Total votes		96,689	100%

=== Results by county ===
County	Dwight D. Eisenhower Republican		Adlai Stevenson Democratic		Margin		Total votes cast
County	#	%	#	%	#	%	Total votes cast
Churchill	2,013	65.31%	1,069	34.69%	944	30.62%	3,082
Clark	18,584	49.32%	19,095	50.68%	-511	-1.36%	37,679
Douglas	1,063	80.59%	256	19.41%	807	61.18%	1,319
Elko	2,981	63.20%	1,736	36.80%	1,245	26.40%	4,717
Esmeralda	164	56.94%	124	43.06%	40	13.88%	288
Eureka	330	64.33%	183	35.67%	147	28.66%	513
Humboldt	1,292	60.60%	840	39.40%	452	21.20%	2,132
Lander	540	65.61%	283	34.39%	257	31.22%	823
Lincoln	885	52.43%	803	47.57%	82	4.86%	1,688
Lyon	1,697	68.48%	781	31.52%	916	36.96%	2,478
Mineral	1,433	50.32%	1,415	49.68%	18	0.64%	2,848
Nye	946	55.81%	749	44.19%	197	11.62%	1,695
Ormsby	1,749	68.03%	822	31.97%	927	36.06%	2,571
Pershing	895	61.43%	562	38.57%	333	22.86%	1,457
Storey	226	60.11%	150	39.89%	76	20.22%	376
Washoe	18,865	66.45%	9,525	33.55%	9,340	32.90%	28,390
White Pine	2,386	51.50%	2,247	48.50%	139	3.00%	4,633
Totals	56,049	57.97%	40,640	42.03%	15,409	15.94%	96,689

==== Counties that flipped from Democratic to Republican ====
- Lincoln
- Mineral

==== Counties that flipped from Republican to Democratic ====
- Clark

== See also ==
- United States presidential elections in Nevada
