= 1912 United States presidential election in Nevada =

- November 5, 1912

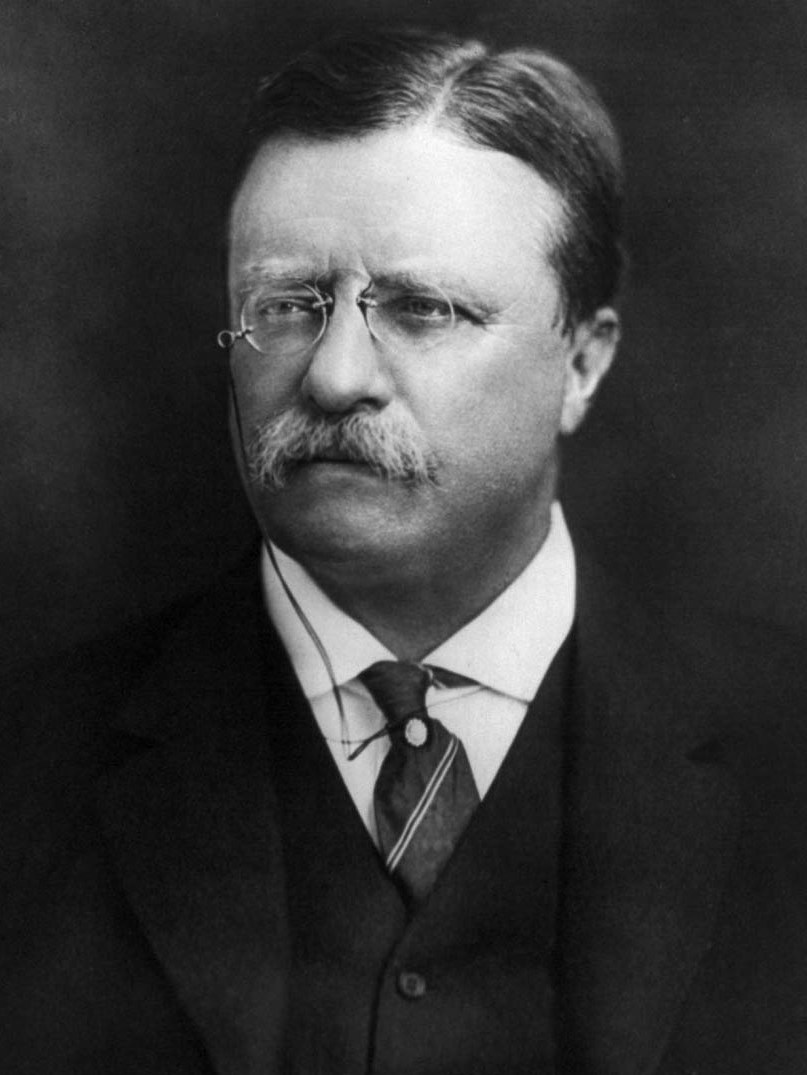

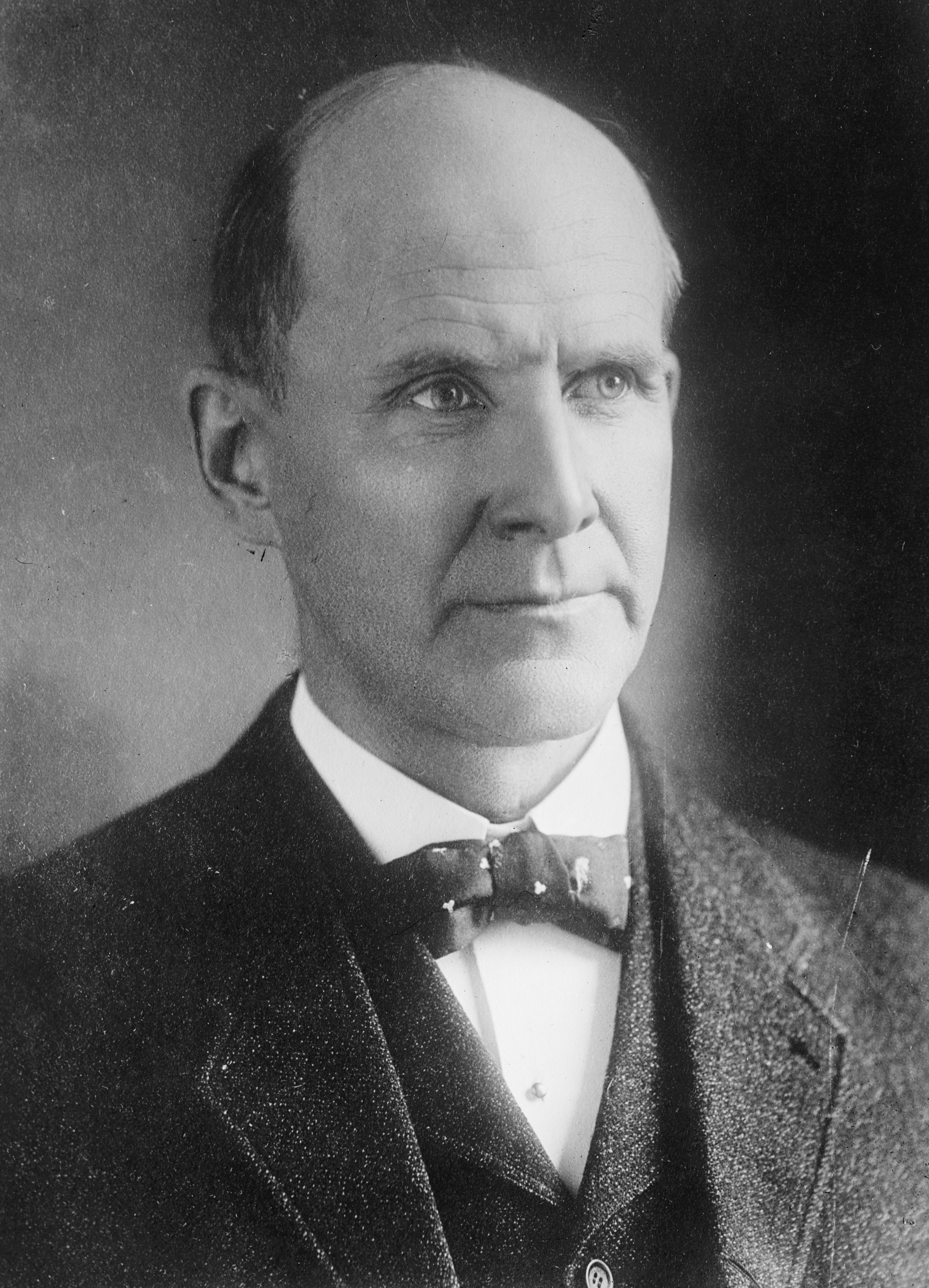

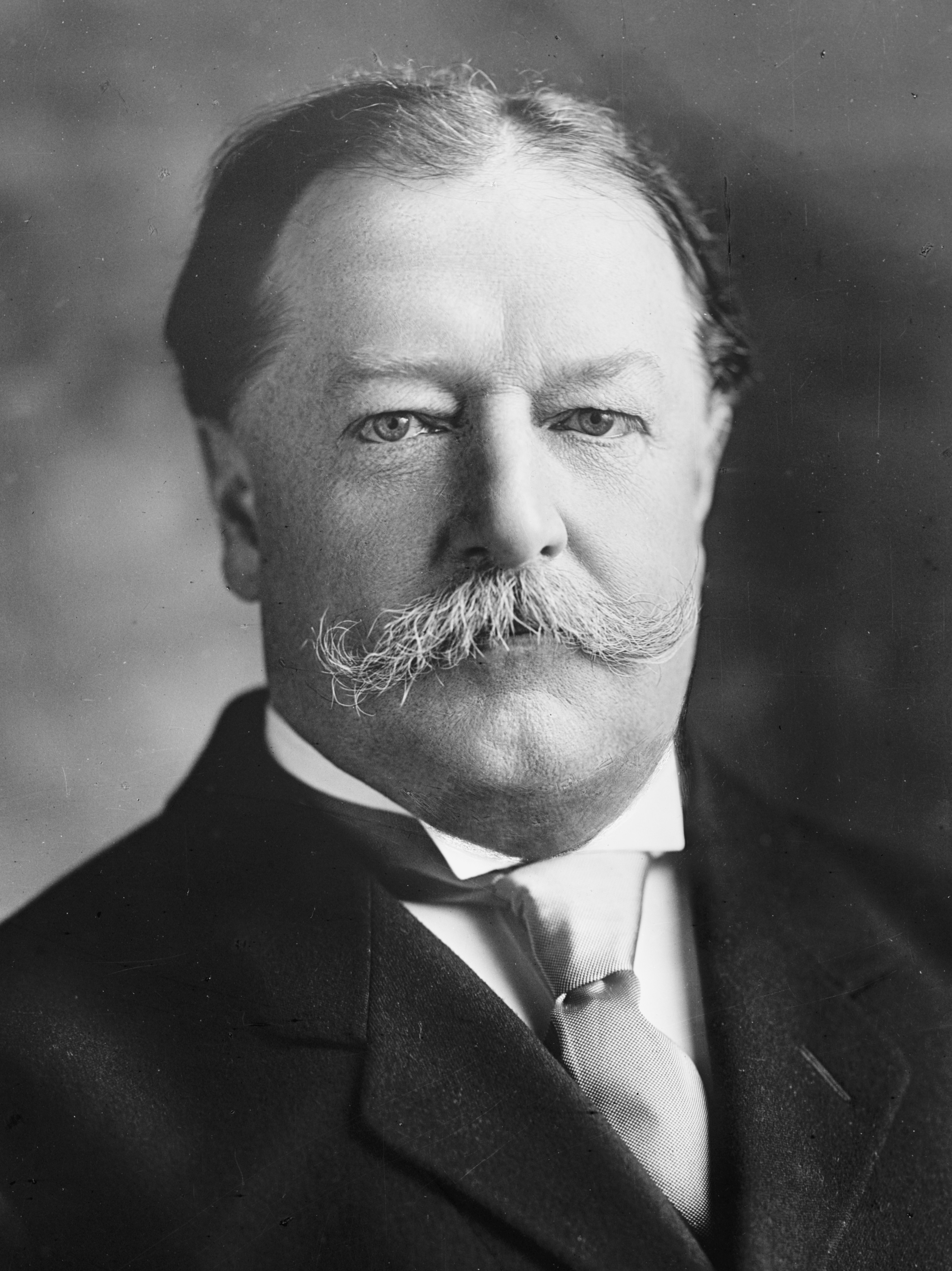
Nominee	Woodrow Wilson	Theodore Roosevelt
Party	Democratic	Progressive
Home state	New Jersey	New York
Running mate	Thomas R. Marshall	Hiram Johnson
Electoral vote	3	0
Popular vote	7,986	5,620
Percentage	39.70%	27.94%
Nominee	Eugene V. Debs	William Howard Taft
Party	Socialist	Republican
Home state	Indiana	Ohio
Running mate	Emil Seidel	Nicholas Murray Butler
Electoral vote	0	0
Popular vote	3,313	3,196
Percentage	16.47%	15.89%
County results
Wilson
30–40%
40–50%
50–60%
Roosevelt
30–40%
40–50%

The 1912 United States presidential election in Nevada took place on November 5, 1912, as part of the 1912 United States presidential election. Voters chose three representatives, or electors to the Electoral College, who voted for president and vice president.

Nevada was won by Woodrow Wilson with 39.7% of the vote. Theodore Roosevelt followed with 27.94%, Eugene V. Debs 16.47%, and Taft 15.89%. Nevada, along with Arizona, Florida, Louisiana, and Mississippi, were the only states where Debs came in third place or better.

== Results ==
General Election Results
Party	Pledged to	Elector	Votes
Democratic Party	Woodrow Wilson	George B. Thatcher	7,986
Democratic Party	Woodrow Wilson	Lem Allen	7,974
Democratic Party	Woodrow Wilson	John H. Cazler	7,929
Progressive Party	Theodore Roosevelt	E. V. Hatch	5,620
Progressive Party	Theodore Roosevelt	Joseph G. McCarthy	5,590
Progressive Party	Theodore Roosevelt	Charles M. Way	5,555
Socialist Party	Eugene V. Debs	George W. Robb	3,313
Socialist Party	Eugene V. Debs	S. L. Fisk	3,296
Socialist Party	Eugene V. Debs	A. A. Hibbard	3,292
Republican Party	William Howard Taft	W. N. McGill	3,196
Republican Party	William Howard Taft	W. W. Booth	3,175
Republican Party	William Howard Taft	Thomas Nelson	3,167
Votes cast (Note: Based on totals for highest elector on each ticket)			20,115

=== Results by county ===
County	Thomas Woodrow Wilson Democratic		William Howard Taft Republican		Theodore Roosevelt Progressive "Bull Moose"		Eugene Victor Debs Socialist		Margin (Note: Because Roosevelt finished ahead of Taft in Nevada as a whole and in every county in the state, all margins give are Wilson minus Roosevelt unless stated in the total for the county in question.)		Total votes cast (Note: Based on highest elector on each ticket)
County	#	%	#	%	#	%	#	%	#	%	Total votes cast
Churchill	349	34.18%	157	15.38%	304	29.77%	211	20.67%	45	4.41%	1,021
Clark	358	42.77%	110	13.14%	261	31.18%	108	12.90%	97	11.59%	837
Douglas	143	34.29%	80	19.18%	172	41.25%	22	5.28%	-29	-6.96%	417
Elko	843	41.98%	398	19.82%	514	25.60%	253	12.60%	329	16.38%	2,008
Esmeralda	713	39.07%	252	13.81%	481	26.36%	379	20.77%	232	12.71%	1,825
Eureka	209	49.29%	70	16.51%	124	29.25%	21	4.95%	85	20.04%	424
Humboldt	719	39.99%	207	11.51%	533	29.64%	339	18.85%	186	10.35%	1,798
Lander	197	38.03%	68	13.13%	200	38.61%	53	10.23%	-3	-0.58%	518
Lincoln	275	50.27%	100	18.28%	144	26.33%	28	5.12%	131	23.94%	547
Lyon	438	37.50%	136	11.64%	355	30.39%	239	20.46%	83	7.11%	1,168
Mineral	219	39.46%	59	10.63%	146	26.31%	131	23.60%	73	13.15%	555
Nye	869	36.84%	345	14.62%	427	18.10%	718	30.44%	151 (Note: In this county where Debs rather than Roosevelt finished second behind Wilson, margin given is Wilson vote minus Debs vote and percentage margin Wilson percentage minus Debs percentage.)	6.40%	2,359
Ormsby	294	43.56%	150	22.22%	166	24.59%	65	9.63%	128	18.97%	675
Storey	400	46.51%	166	19.30%	212	24.65%	82	9.53%	188	21.86%	860
Washoe	1,446	40.14%	644	17.88%	1,150	31.93%	362	10.05%	296	8.21%	3,602
White Pine	514	34.24%	254	16.92%	431	28.71%	302	20.12%	83	5.53%	1,501
Totals	7,986	39.70%	3,196	15.89%	5,620	27.94%	3,313	16.47%	2,366	11.76%	20,115

==== Counties that flipped from Republican to Democratic ====
- Churchill
- Eureka
- Lyon
- Ormsby
- Storey
- Washoe
- White Pine

==== Counties that flipped from Republican to Progressive ====
- Douglas

==== Counties that flipped from Democratic to Progressive ====
- Lander

== See also ==
- United States presidential elections in Nevada
