= 1868 United States presidential election in Nevada =

- November 3, 1868
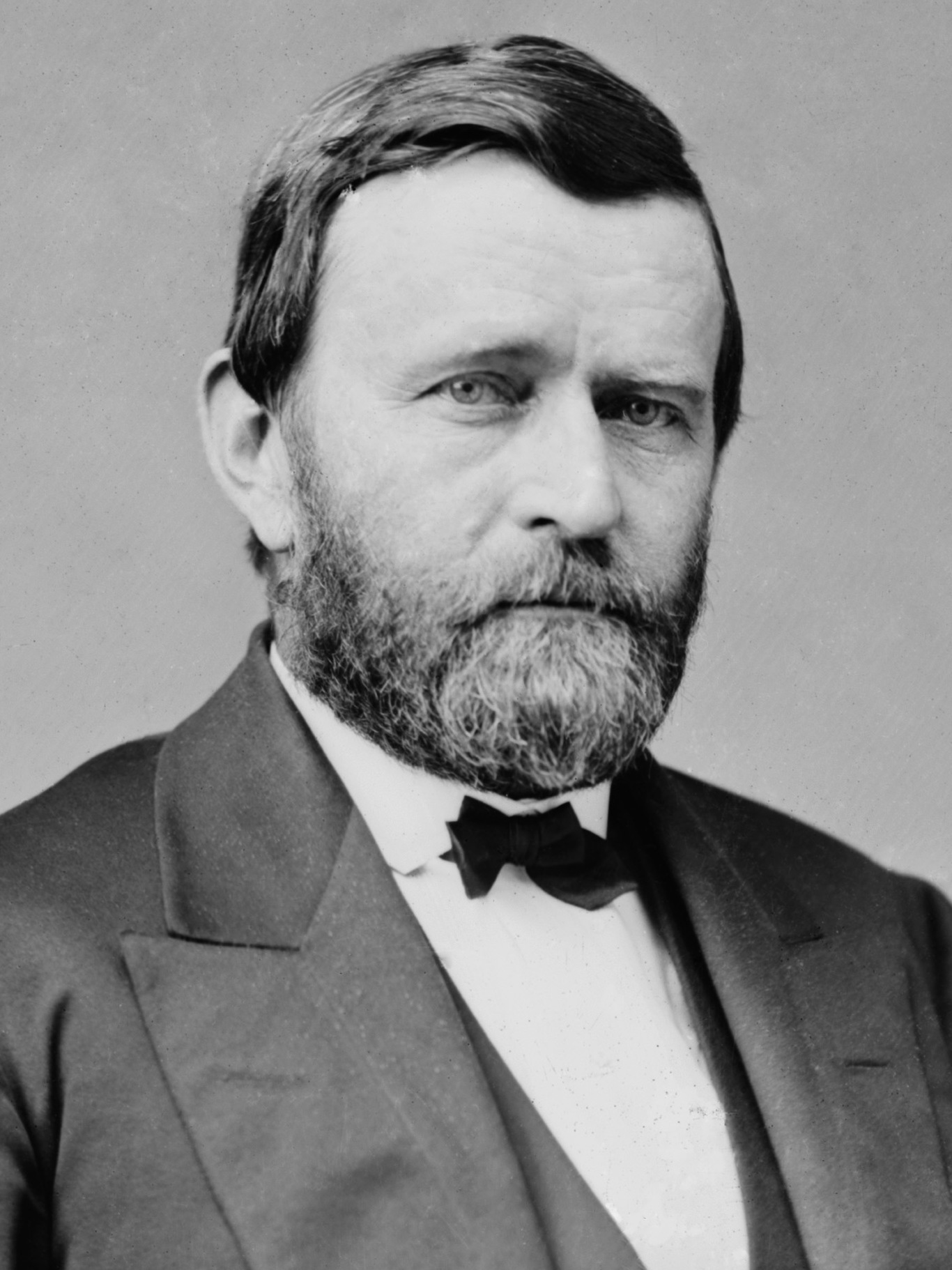

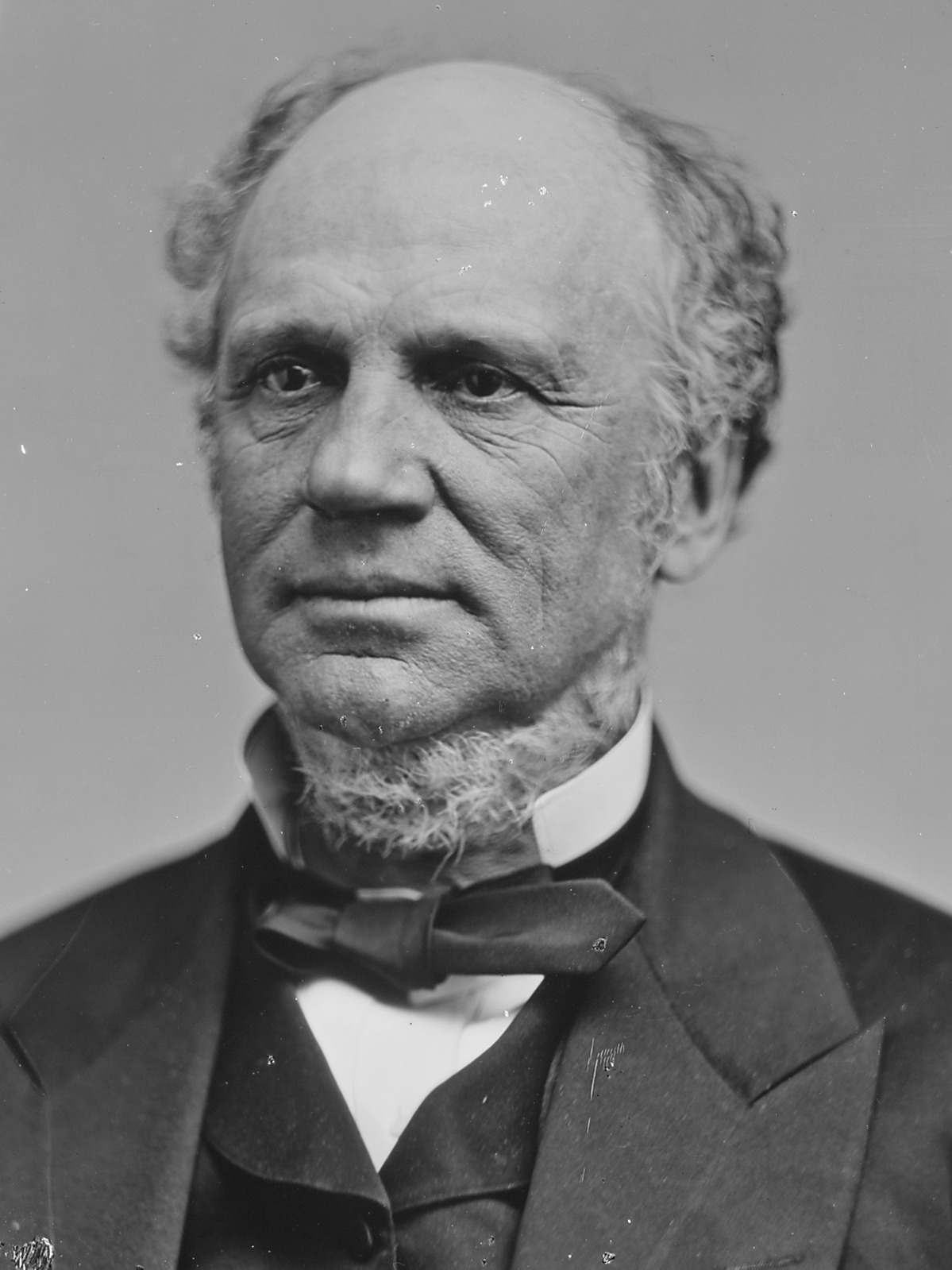
Nominee	Ulysses S. Grant	Horatio Seymour
Party	Republican	Democratic
Home state	Illinois	New York
Running mate	Schuyler Colfax	Francis Preston Blair Jr.
Electoral vote	3	0
Popular vote	6,480	5,218
Percentage	55.39%	44.61%
County results
Grant
50–60%
60–70%
Seymour
50–60%
Tie
President before election
Andrew Johnson
Democratic
Elected President
Ulysses S. Grant
Republican

The 1868 United States presidential election in Nevada took place on November 3, 1868, as part of the 1868 United States presidential election. Nevada voters chose three representatives, or electors, to the Electoral College, who voted for president and vice president.

Nevada was won by Ulysses S. Grant, formerly the 6th Commanding General of the United States Army (R-Illinois), running with Speaker of the House Schuyler Colfax, with 55.39% of the popular vote, against the 18th governor of New York, Horatio Seymour (D–New York), running with former Senator Francis Preston Blair Jr., with 44.61% of the vote.

== Results ==
General Election Results
Party	Pledged to	Elector	Votes
Republican Party	Ulysses S. Grant	J. W. Haines	6,480
Republican Party	Ulysses S. Grant	A. L. Page	6,476
Republican Party	Ulysses S. Grant	Charles E. De Long	6,474
Democratic Party	Horatio Seymour	William M. Seawell	5,218
Democratic Party	Horatio Seymour	R. B. Ellis	5,215
Democratic Party	Horatio Seymour	William Woodburn	5,215
Votes cast (Note: Based on totals for highest elector on each ticket)			11,698

=== Results by county ===
	Ulysses S. Grant Republican		Horatio Seymour Democratic		Margin		Total votes cast (Note: Based on highest elector on each ticket)
County	#	%	#	%	#	%	Total votes cast
Churchill	75	50.00%	75	50.00%	0 (Note: Using the highest elector on the Republican ticket results in a tie, although the other two Republican electors received 76 votes each in this county)	0.00%	150
Douglas	256	68.45%	118	31.55%	138	36.90%	374
Esmeralda	267	57.42%	198	42.58%	69	14.84%	465
Humboldt	313	52.25%	286	47.75%	27	4.51%	599
Lander	1,000	50.13%	995	49.87%	5	0.25%	1,995
Lincoln	50	47.17%	56	52.83%	-6	-5.66%	106
Lyon	488	58.72%	343	41.28%	145	17.45%	831
Nye	353	50.00%	353	50.00%	0	0.00%	706
Ormsby	500	54.35%	420	45.65%	80	8.70%	920
Storey	2,319	57.15%	1,739	42.85%	580	14.29%	4,058
Washoe	859	57.50%	635	42.50%	224	14.99%	1,494
Totals	6,480	55.39%	5,218	44.61%	1,262	10.79%	11,698

==== Counties that flipped from Democratic to Republican ====
- Churchill (became tied)

==== Counties that flipped from Republican to Democratic ====
- Nye (became tied)
- Lincoln

== See also ==
- United States presidential elections in Nevada
