= 1864 United States presidential election in Nevada =

- November 8, 1864

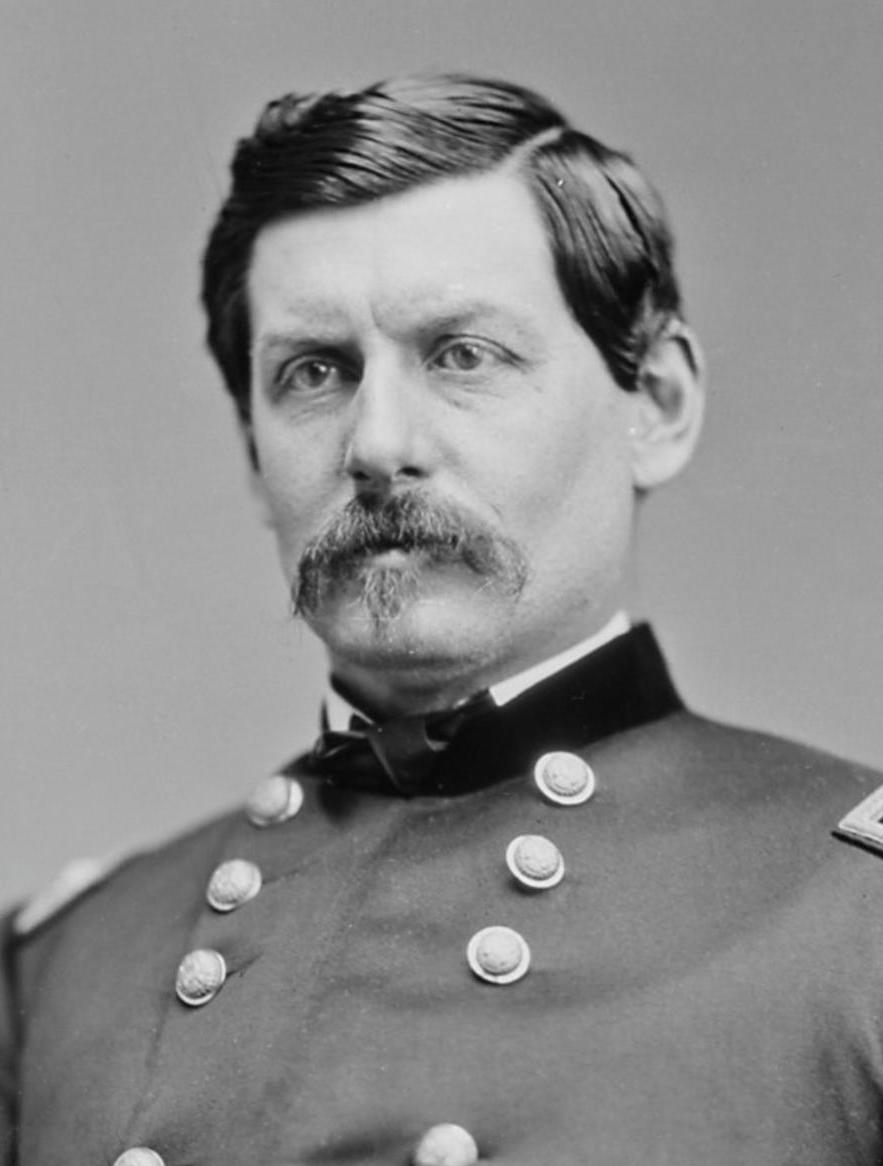
Nominee	Abraham Lincoln	George B. McClellan
Party	National Union	Democratic
Home state	Illinois	New Jersey
Running mate	Andrew Johnson	George H. Pendleton
Electoral vote	2	0
Popular vote	9,826	6,594
Percentage	59.84%	40.16%
County results
Lincoln
50—60%
60–70%
70—80%
McClellan
50–60%
President before election
Abraham Lincoln
Republican
Elected President
Abraham Lincoln
National Union

The 1864 United States presidential election in Nevada took place on November 8, 1864, as part of the 1864 United States presidential election. State voters chose three electors of the Electoral College, two of whom voted for president and vice president.

Nevada voted in its first ever presidential election in 1864, having become the 36th state just eight days before the election (on October 31). The state was won by the National Union candidate, incumbent Republican President Abraham Lincoln of Illinois and his running mate former Senator and Military Governor of Tennessee Andrew Johnson. They defeated the Democratic candidate, 4th Commanding General of the United States Army George B. McClellan of New Jersey and his running mate Representative George H. Pendleton of Ohio. Lincoln won the state by a margin of 19.68%.

Due to one of the electors, Addison Peck, getting snowbound and there being no law to replace him, this election is one of three occasions where only two electoral votes were cast by a state or district in a presidential election: the others were in Mississippi in 1820, as one of the state's three electors died before the Electoral College convened and there was insufficient time to find a replacement, and the District of Columbia in 2000, as one of the district's three electors abstained.

== Results ==
General Election Results
Party	Pledged to	Elector	Votes
National Union	Abraham Lincoln	A. W. Baldwin	9,826
National Union	Abraham Lincoln	Stephen T. Gage	9,822
National Union	Abraham Lincoln	A. S. Peck (Note: Was unable to cast his Electoral College vote)	9,822
Democratic Party	George B. McClellan	H. M. Jones	6,594
Democratic Party	George B. McClellan	M. S. Bonnifield	6,590
Democratic Party	George B. McClellan	J. F. Angell	6,587
Votes cast (Note: Based on totals for highest elector on each ticket)			16,420

=== Results by county ===
	Abraham Lincoln National Union		George Brinton McClellan Democratic		Margin		Total votes cast (Note: Based on highest elector on each ticket)
County	#	%	#	%	#	%	Total votes cast
Churchill	129	45.42%	155	54.58%	-26	-9.16%	284
Douglas	499	74.37%	172	25.63%	327	48.73%	671
Esmeralda	613	59.46%	418	40.54%	195	18.91%	1,031
Humboldt	484	59.02%	336	40.98%	148	18.05%	820
Lander	1,320	51.91%	1,223	48.09%	97	3.81%	2,543
Lyon	964	75.55%	312	24.45%	652	51.10%	1,276
Nye	115	61.17%	73	38.83%	42	22.34%	188
Ormsby	708	55.62%	565	44.38%	143	11.23%	1,273
Storey	3,410	58.18%	2,451	41.82%	959	16.36%	5,861
Washoe & Roop	1,072	56.57%	823	43.43%	446	13.14%	1,895 (Note: Returns for Washoe and Roop were received together.)
Soldiers	512	88.58%	66	11.42%	446	77.16%	578
Totals	9,826	59.84%	6,594	40.16%	3,232	19.68%	16,420

== See also ==
- United States presidential elections in Nevada
