= 1876 United States presidential election in Nevada =

- November 7, 1876
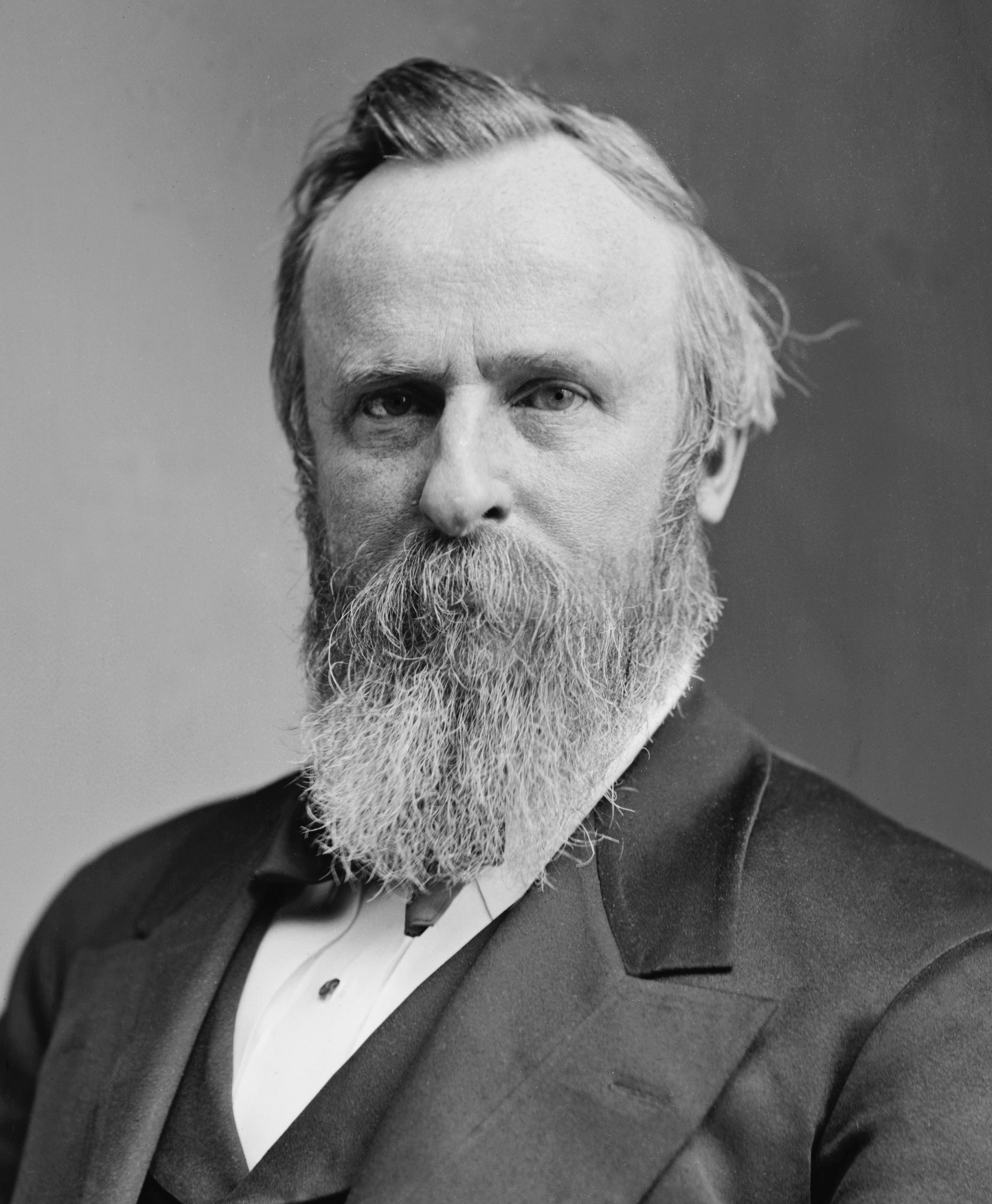

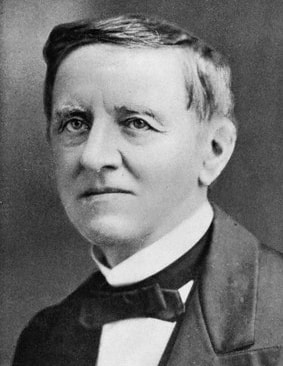
Nominee	Rutherford B. Hayes	Samuel J. Tilden
Party	Republican	Democratic
Home state	Ohio	New York
Running mate	William A. Wheeler	Thomas A. Hendricks
Electoral vote	3	0
Popular vote	10,383	9,308
Percentage	52.73%	47.27%
County results
Hayes
50–60%
60–70%
Tilden
50–60%
Tie
<50%
President before election
Ulysses S. Grant
Republican
Elected President
Rutherford B. Hayes
Republican

The 1876 United States presidential election in Nevada took place on November 7, 1876, as part of the 1876 United States presidential election. Voters chose three representatives, or electors to the Electoral College, who voted for president and vice president.

Nevada voted for the Republican nominee, Rutherford B. Hayes, over the Democratic nominee, Samuel J. Tilden. Hayes won the state by a margin of 5.46%.

== Results ==
General Election Results
Party	Pledged to	Elector	Votes
Republican Party	Rutherford B. Hayes	George Tufly	10,383
Republican Party	Rutherford B. Hayes	W. W. Bishop	10,369
Republican Party	Rutherford B. Hayes	R. M. Daggett	10,360
Democratic Party	Samuel J. Tilden	J. C. Currie	9,308
Democratic Party	Samuel J. Tilden	E. Blennerhasset	9,294
Democratic Party	Samuel J. Tilden	J. C. Hagerman	9,291
Votes cast (Note: Based on totals for highest elector on each ticket)			19,691

=== Results by county ===
	Rutherford B. Hayes Republican		Samuel J. Tilden Democratic		Margin		Total votes cast (Note: Based on highest elector on each ticket)
County	#	%	#	%	#	%	Total votes cast
Churchill	34	42.50%	46	57.50%	-12	-15.00%	80
Douglas	332	64.97%	179	35.03%	153	29.94%	511
Elko	763	48.20%	820	51.80%	-57	-3.60%	1,583
Esmeralda	370	49.80%	373	50.20%	-3	-0.40%	743
Eureka	779	50.32%	769	49.68%	10	0.65%	1,548
Humboldt	394	44.07%	500	55.93%	-106	-11.86%	894
Lander	380	41.99%	525	58.01%	-145	-16.02%	905
Lincoln	359	47.74%	393	52.26%	-34	-4.52%	752
Lyon	533	63.60%	305	36.40%	228	27.21%	838
Nye	429	49.60%	436	50.40%	-7	-0.81%	865
Ormsby	844	62.52%	506	37.48%	338	25.04%	1,350
Storey	3,692	53.37%	3,226	46.63%	466	6.74%	6,918
Washoe	906	57.78%	662	42.22%	244	15.56%	1,568
White Pine	568	50.00%	568	50.00%	0	0.00%	1,136
Totals	10,383	52.73%	9,308	47.27%	1,075	5.46%	19,691

==== Counties that flipped from Republican to Democratic ====
- Elko
- Esmeralda
- Humboldt
- Lander
- Nye

== See also ==
- United States presidential elections in Nevada
