= 1948 United States presidential election in Nevada =

- November 2, 1948

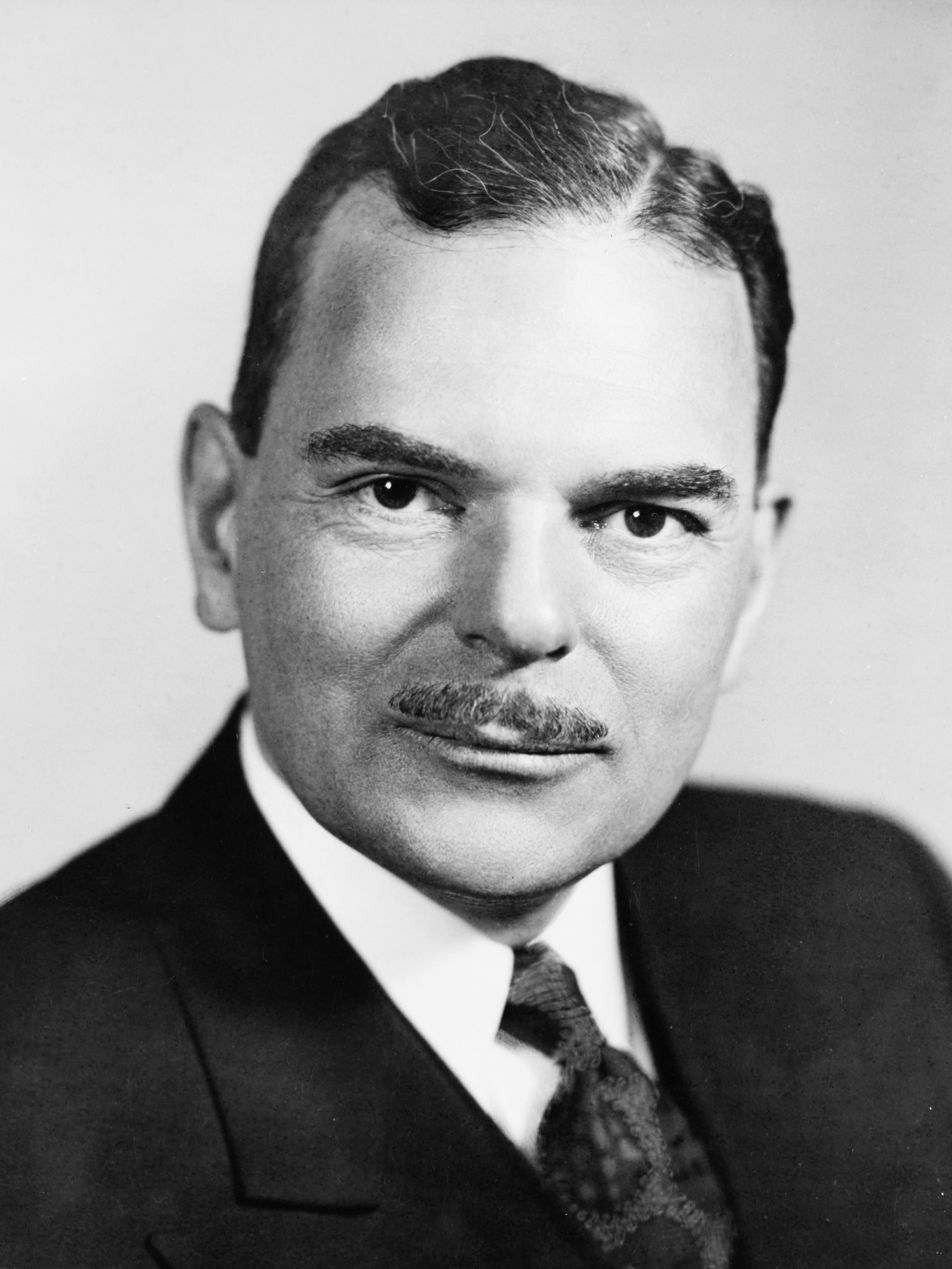
Nominee	Harry S. Truman	Thomas E. Dewey
Party	Democratic	Republican
Home state	Missouri	New York
Running mate	Alben W. Barkley	Earl Warren
Electoral vote	3	0
Popular vote	31,291	29,357
Percentage	50.37%	47.26%
County results
Truman
50–60%
60–70%
Dewey
40–50%
50–60%
60–70%
President before election
Harry S. Truman
Democratic
Elected President
Harry S. Truman
Democratic

The 1948 United States presidential election in Nevada took place on November 2, 1948, as part of the 1948 United States presidential election. State voters chose three representatives, or electors, to the Electoral College, who voted for president and vice president.

Nevada was won by incumbent President Harry S. Truman (D–Missouri), running with Senator Alben W. Barkley, with 50.37% of the popular vote, against Governor Thomas E. Dewey (R–New York), running with Governor Earl Warren, with 47.26% of the popular vote. This was the last election where voters in Nevada selected presidential electors directly.

== Results ==
General Election Results
Party	Pledged to	Elector	Votes
Democratic Party	Harry S. Truman	L. O. Hawkins	31,291
Democratic Party	Harry S. Truman	James C. Riordan	31,291
Democratic Party	Harry S. Truman	J. J. Cleary	31,290 (Note: This is not a misprint; Cleary received 1,003 votes in Lincoln County while Hawkins and Riordan received 1,004 each)
Republican Party	Thomas E. Dewey	Carl F. Dodge	29,357
Republican Party	Thomas E. Dewey	Mrs. Kenneth F. Johnson	29,357
Republican Party	Thomas E. Dewey	Leo A. McNamee	29,357
Progressive Party	Henry A. Wallace	M. D. Inskeep	1,469
Progressive Party	Henry A. Wallace	E. P. Owens	1,469
Progressive Party	Henry A. Wallace	Donald C. Smart	1,469
Votes cast (Note: Based on totals for highest elector on each ticket)			62,117

=== Results by county ===
County	Harry S. Truman Democratic		Thomas Edmund Dewey Republican		Henry Agard Wallace Progressive		Margin		Total votes cast
County	#	%	#	%	#	%	#	%	Total votes cast
Churchill	1,055	44.48%	1,206	50.84%	111	4.68%	-151	-6.37%	2,372
Clark	10,787	61.81%	6,382	36.57%	284	1.63%	4,405	25.24%	17,453
Douglas	298	28.88%	719	69.67%	15	1.45%	-421	-40.79%	1,032
Elko	2,026	53.73%	1,683	44.63%	62	1.64%	343	9.10%	3,771
Esmeralda	183	50.14%	164	44.93%	18	4.93%	19	5.21%	365
Eureka	278	46.10%	312	51.74%	13	2.16%	-34	-5.64%	603
Humboldt	886	48.39%	901	49.21%	44	2.40%	-15	-0.82%	1,831
Lander	298	42.33%	397	56.39%	9	1.28%	-99	-14.06%	704
Lincoln	1,004	64.65%	520	33.48%	29	1.87%	484	31.17%	1,553
Lyon	629	38.52%	967	59.22%	37	2.27%	-338	-20.70%	1,633
Mineral	1,194	61.93%	706	36.62%	28	1.45%	488	25.31%	1,928
Nye	595	42.81%	722	51.94%	73	5.25%	-127	-9.14%	1,390
Ormsby	681	37.81%	1,095	60.80%	25	1.39%	-414	-22.99%	1,801
Pershing	541	42.87%	677	53.65%	44	3.49%	-136	-10.78%	1,262
Storey	184	47.42%	187	48.20%	17	4.38%	-3	-0.77%	388
Washoe	8,365	41.44%	11,323	56.09%	500	2.48%	-2,958	-14.65%	20,188
White Pine	2,287	59.51%	1,396	36.33%	160	4.16%	891	23.19%	3,843
Totals	31,291	51.59%	29,357	48.41%	1,469	2.36%	1,934	3.19%	62,117

==== Counties that flipped from Democratic to Republican ====
- Humboldt
- Nye
- Storey

== See also ==
- United States presidential elections in Nevada
