= 1888 United States presidential election in Nevada =

- November 6, 1888
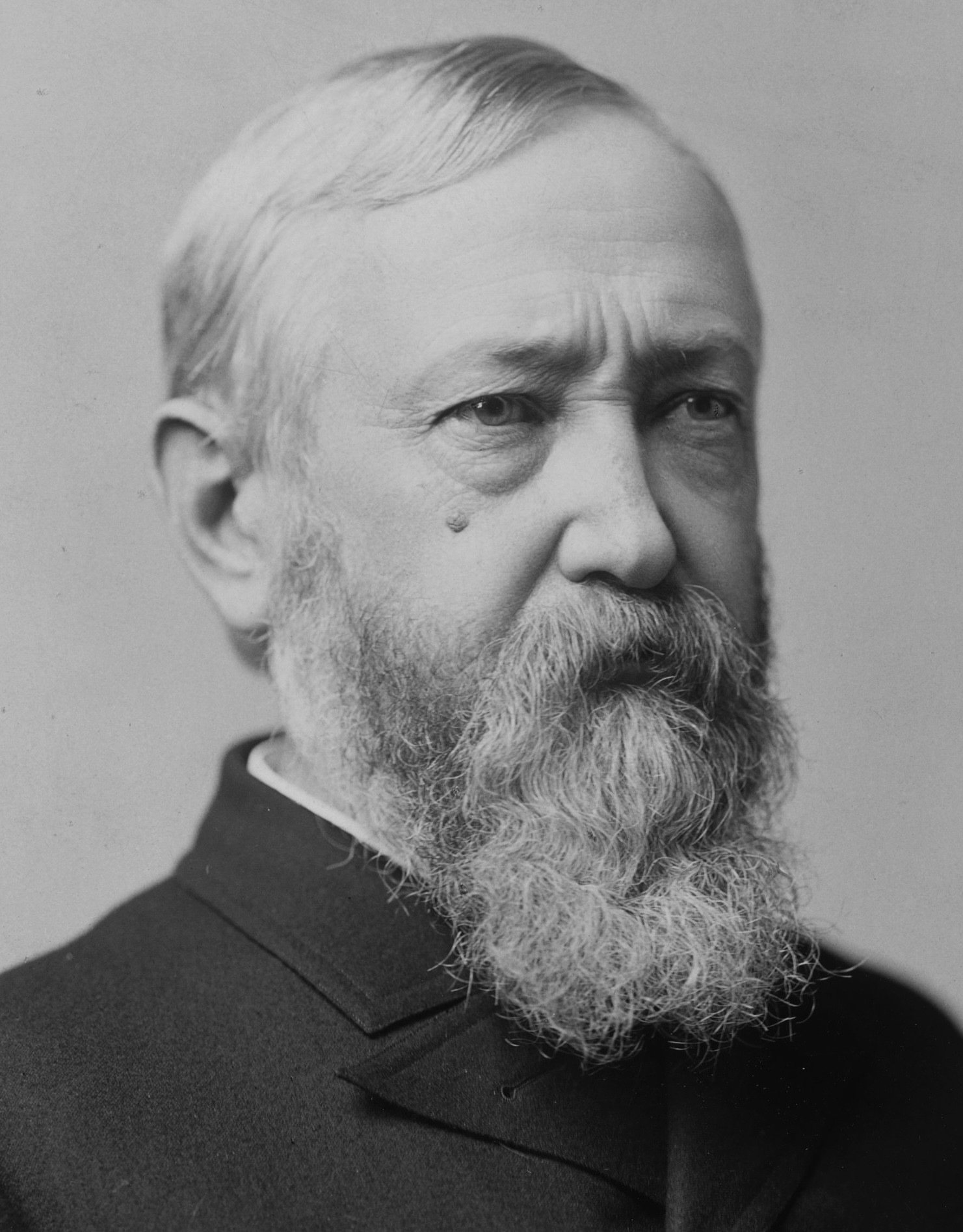

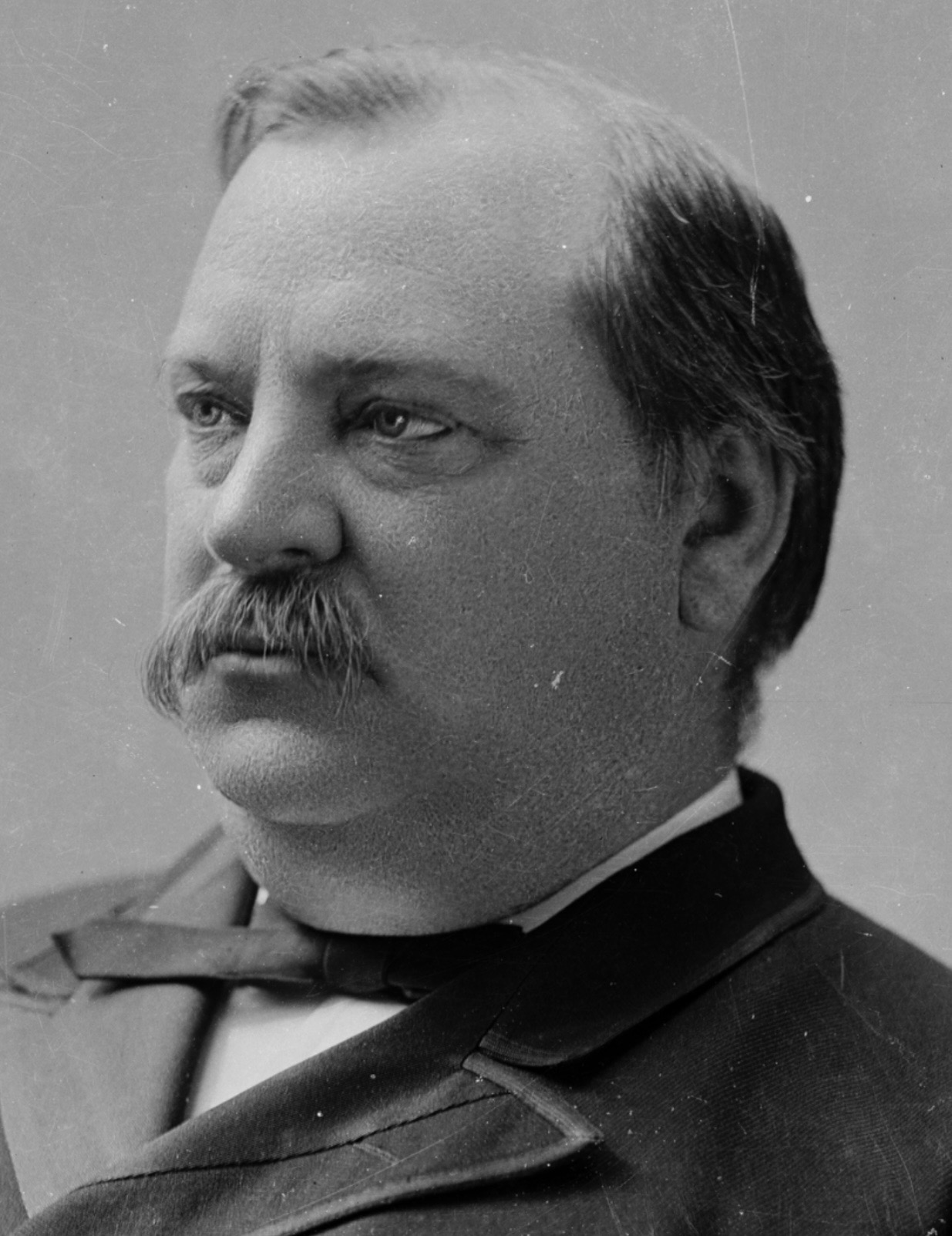
Nominee	Benjamin Harrison	Grover Cleveland
Party	Republican	Democratic
Home state	Indiana	New York
Running mate	Levi P. Morton	Allen G. Thurman
Electoral vote	3	0
Popular vote	7,088	5,149
Percentage	57.73%	41.94%
County results
Harrison
50–60%
60–70%
Cleveland
50–60%
President before election
Grover Cleveland
Democratic
Elected President
Benjamin Harrison
Republican

The 1888 United States presidential election in Nevada took place on November 6, 1888, as part of the 1888 United States presidential election. Voters chose three representatives, or electors to the Electoral College, who voted for president and vice president.

Nevada voted for the Republican nominee, Benjamin Harrison, over the Democratic nominee, incumbent President Grover Cleveland. Harrison won the state by a margin of 15.79%.

With 57.73% of the popular vote, Nevada would prove to be Harrison's second strongest victory in terms of percentage in the popular vote after Vermont.

== Results ==
General Election Results
Party	Pledged to	Elector	Votes
Republican Party	Benjamin Harrison	G. F. Turrittin	7,088
Republican Party	Benjamin Harrison	E. N. Robinson	7,087
Republican Party	Benjamin Harrison	A. C. Cleveland	7,079
Democratic Party	Grover Cleveland	James A. Hardin	5,149
Democratic Party	Grover Cleveland	Theodore Winters	5,126
Democratic Party	Grover Cleveland	C. C. Thomas	5,107
Prohibition Party	Clinton B. Fisk	Abram Banta	41
Prohibition Party	Clinton B. Fisk	Charles Chenoweth	41
Prohibition Party	Clinton B. Fisk	J. R. Hammond	41
Votes cast (Note: Based on totals for highest elector on each ticket)			12,278

=== Results by county ===
	Benjamin Harrison Republican		Grover Cleveland Democratic		Clinton B. Fisk Prohibition		Margin		Total votes cast (Note: Based on highest elector on each ticket)
County	#	%	#	%	#	%	#	%	Total votes cast
Churchill	86	49.14%	89	50.86%	0	0.00%	-3	-1.71%	175
Douglas	269	64.20%	144	34.37%	6	1.43%	125	29.83%	419
Elko	793	53.08%	695	46.52%	6	0.40%	98	6.56%	1,494
Esmeralda	413	60.74%	265	38.97%	2	0.29%	148	21.76%	680
Eureka	607	62.97%	356	36.93%	1	0.10%	251	26.04%	964
Humboldt	430	47.36%	467	51.43%	11	1.21%	-37	-4.07%	908
Lander	374	58.07%	270	41.93%	0	0.00%	104	16.15%	644
Lincoln (Note: The return from this county arrived too late to be included in the official canvass)	150	45.87%	177	54.13%	0	0.00%	-27	-8.26%	327
Lyon	449	63.06%	263	36.94%	0	0.00%	186	26.12%	712
Nye	137	69.54%	60	30.46%	0	0.00%	77	39.09%	197
Ormsby	570	61.69%	354	38.31%	0	0.00%	216	23.38%	924
Storey	1,611	56.49%	1,241	43.51%	0	0.00%	370	12.97%	2,852
Washoe	902	57.42%	655	41.69%	14	0.89%	247	15.72%	1,571
White Pine	386	64.33%	213	35.50%	1	0.17%	173	28.83%	600
Totals (Note: Does not include the votes from Lincoln County)	7,088	57.73%	5,249	41.94%	41	0.33%	1,939	15.55%	12,278

==== Counties that flipped from Republican to Democratic ====
- Churchill

== See also ==
- United States presidential elections in Nevada
