= 1920 United States presidential election in Nevada =

- November 2, 1920
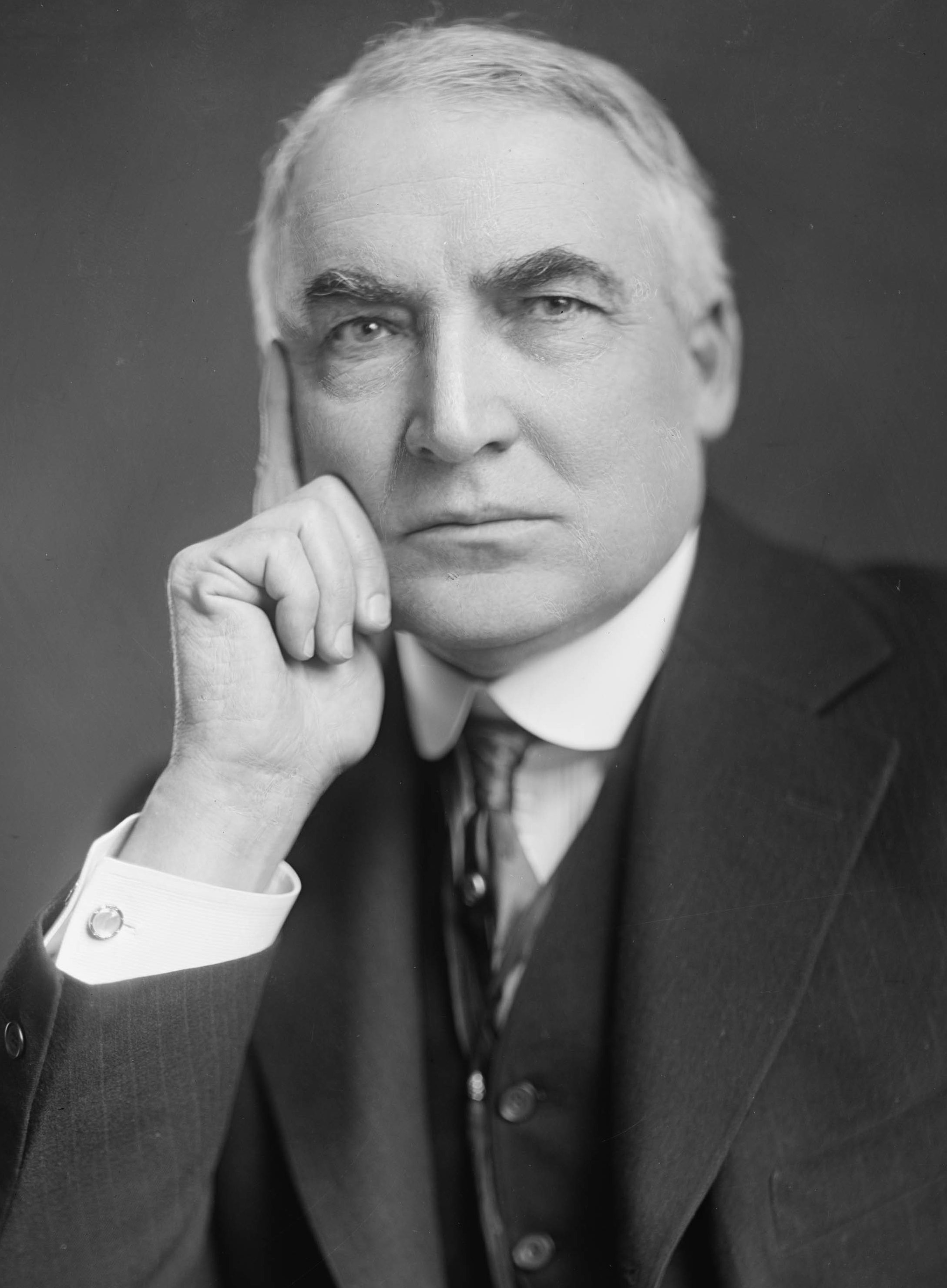

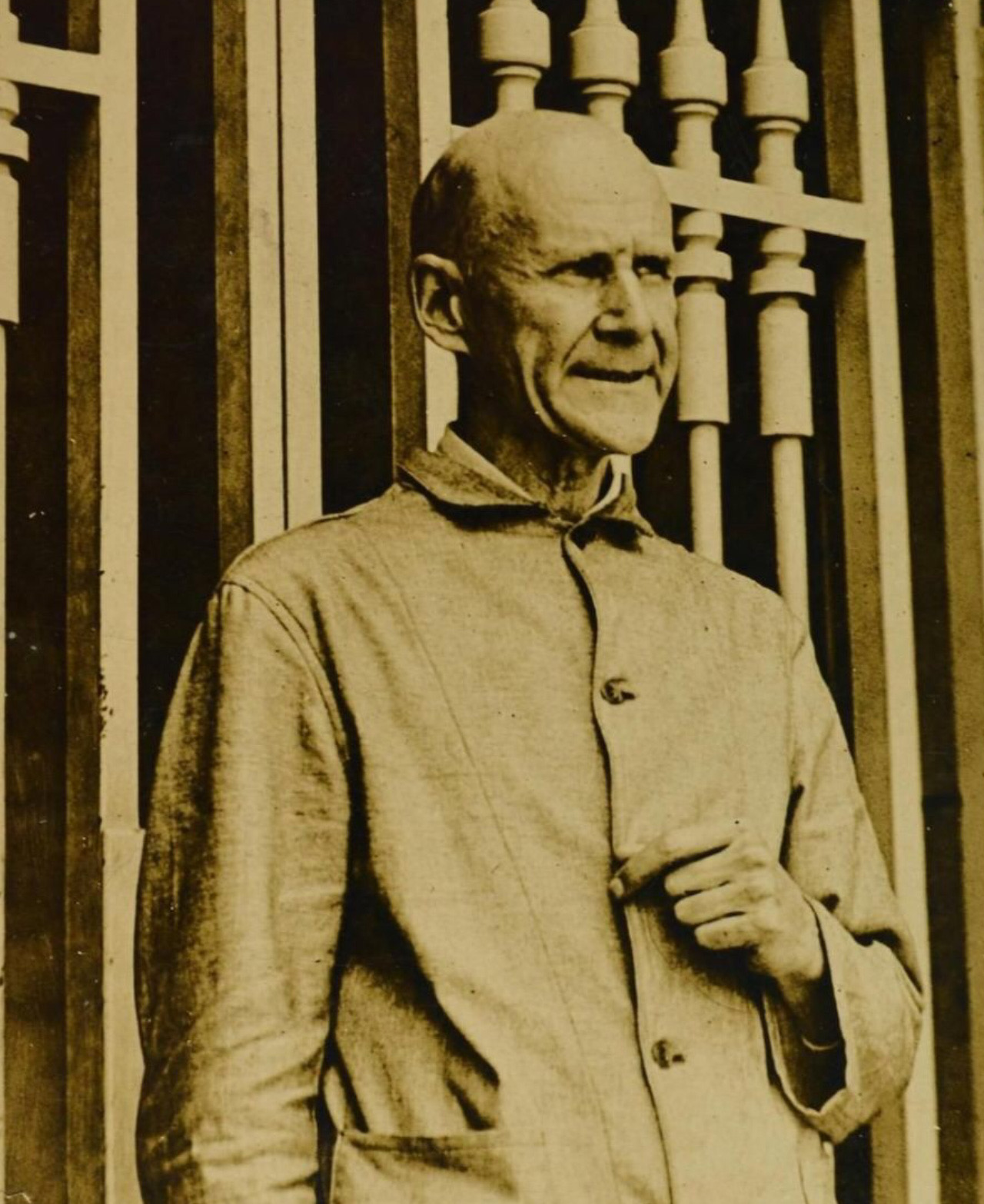
Nominee	Warren G. Harding	James M. Cox	Eugene V. Debs
Party	Republican	Democratic	Socialist
Home state	Ohio	Ohio	Indiana
Running mate	Calvin Coolidge	Franklin D. Roosevelt	Seymour Stedman
Electoral vote	3	0	0
Popular vote	15,479	9,851	1,864
Percentage	56.92%	36.22%	6.85%
County results
Harding
40–50%
50–60%
60–70%
70–80%
Cox
40–50%
President before election
Woodrow Wilson
Democratic
Elected President
Warren G. Harding
Republican

The 1920 United States presidential election in Nevada took place on November 2, 1920, as part of the 1920 United States presidential election which was held throughout all contemporary 48 states. Voters in Nevada chose three electors to the Electoral College, who voted for president and vice president.

Nevada voted for Republican nominee, Senator Warren G. Harding of Ohio, over the Democratic nominee, Governor James M. Cox of Ohio. Harding ran with Governor Calvin Coolidge of Massachusetts, while Cox ran with Assistant Secretary of the Navy Franklin D. Roosevelt of New York.

Harding won Nevada by a margin of 20.70%.

== Results ==
General Election Results
Party	Pledged to	Elector	Votes
Republican Party	Warren G. Harding	Delle B. Boyd	15,479
Republican Party	Warren G. Harding	Louis G. Campbell	15,416
Republican Party	Warren G. Harding	H. V. Morehouse	15,402
Democratic Party	James M. Cox	William Forman	9,851
Democratic Party	James M. Cox	Sarah J. George	9,783
Democratic Party	James M. Cox	Robert W. Hesson	9,776
Socialist Party	Eugene V. Debs	Al Emerick	1,864
Socialist Party	Eugene V. Debs	J. L. Russell	1,861
Socialist Party	Eugene V. Debs	Joseph York	1,849
Votes cast (Note: Based on totals for highest elector on each ticket)			27,194

=== Results by county ===
County	Warren Gamaliel Harding Republican		James Middleton Cox Democratic		Eugene Victor Debs Socialist		Margin		Total votes cast (Note: Based on highest elector on each ticket)
County	#	%	#	%	#	%	#	%	Total votes cast
Churchill	873	54.02%	506	31.31%	237	14.67%	367	22.71%	1,616
Clark	589	44.62%	620	46.97%	111	8.41%	-31	-2.35%	1,320
Douglas	503	76.68%	147	22.41%	6	0.91%	356	54.27%	656
Elko	1,369	54.30%	1,029	40.82%	123	4.88%	340	13.49%	2,521
Esmeralda	466	49.57%	347	36.91%	127	13.51%	119	12.66%	940
Eureka	313	63.75%	157	31.98%	21	4.28%	156	31.77%	491
Humboldt	660	51.40%	532	41.43%	92	7.17%	128	9.97%	1,284
Lander	416	58.67%	254	35.83%	39	5.50%	162	22.85%	709
Lincoln	373	47.64%	366	46.74%	44	5.62%	7	0.89%	783
Lyon	945	67.12%	344	24.43%	119	8.45%	601	42.68%	1,408
Mineral	374	59.46%	209	33.23%	46	7.31%	165	26.23%	629
Nye	1,576	54.36%	1,007	34.74%	316	10.90%	569	19.63%	2,899
Ormsby	592	57.81%	413	40.33%	19	1.86%	179	17.48%	1,024
Pershing	563	56.53%	389	39.06%	44	4.42%	174	17.47%	996
Storey	324	52.51%	272	44.08%	21	3.40%	52	8.43%	617
Washoe	4,189	61.02%	2,357	34.33%	319	4.65%	1,832	26.69%	6,865
White Pine	1,354	55.58%	902	37.03%	180	7.39%	452	18.56%	2,436
Totals	15,479	56.92%	9,851	36.22%	1,864	6.85%	5,628	20.70%	27,194

==== Counties that flipped from Democratic to Republican ====
- Churchill
- Elko
- Esmeralda
- Eureka
- Humboldt
- Lander
- Lincoln
- Lyon
- Mineral
- Nye
- Ormsby
- Storey
- Washoe
- White Pine

== See also ==
- United States presidential elections in Nevada
