= 1964 United States presidential election in Nevada =

- November 3, 1964

Nominee	Lyndon B. Johnson	Barry Goldwater
Party	Democratic	Republican
Home state	Texas	Arizona
Running mate	Hubert Humphrey	William E. Miller
Electoral vote	3	0
Popular vote	79,339	56,094
Percentage	58.58%	41.42%
County results
Johnson
50–60%
60–70%
70–80%
Goldwater
50–60%
President before election
Lyndon B. Johnson
Democratic
Elected President
Lyndon B. Johnson
Democratic

The 1964 United States presidential election in Nevada took place on November 3, 1964, as part of the 1964 United States presidential election. State voters chose three representatives, or electors, to the Electoral College, who voted for president and vice president.

Nevada was won by incumbent President Lyndon B. Johnson (D–Texas), with 58.58% of the popular vote, against Senator Barry Goldwater (R–Arizona), with 41.42% of the popular vote.

As of the 2024 presidential election, this is the last election in which Elko County, Humboldt County, Pershing County, Lander County, Lincoln County, and Eureka County voted for a Democratic presidential candidate. Washoe County and Carson City did not vote Democratic again until 2008. This was also the last election until 1992 that a Democratic presidential candidate carried Nevada, and the last until 2008 in which the party received a majority of the vote.

== Results ==
1964 United States presidential election in Nevada
Party	Candidate	Votes	%
Democratic	Lyndon B. Johnson (inc.)	79,339	58.58%
Republican	Barry Goldwater	56,094	41.42%
Total votes		135,433	100%

=== Results by county ===
County	Lyndon B. Johnson Democratic		Barry Goldwater Republican		Margin		Total votes cast
County	#	%	#	%	#	%	Total votes cast
Churchill	1,565	49.34%	1,607	50.66%	-42	-1.32%	3,172
Clark	40,760	63.02%	23,921	36.98%	16,839	26.04%	64,681
Douglas	1,010	47.26%	1,127	52.74%	-117	-5.48%	2,137
Elko	2,785	60.01%	1,856	39.99%	929	20.02%	4,641
Esmeralda	187	58.81%	131	41.19%	56	17.62%	318
Eureka	285	53.98%	243	46.02%	42	7.96%	528
Humboldt	1,421	56.23%	1,106	43.77%	315	12.46%	2,527
Lander	391	53.64%	338	46.36%	53	7.28%	729
Lincoln	785	64.08%	440	35.92%	345	28.16%	1,225
Lyon	1,327	48.72%	1,397	51.28%	-70	-2.56%	2,724
Mineral	1,440	60.84%	927	39.16%	513	21.68%	2,367
Nye	1,276	60.82%	822	39.18%	454	21.64%	2,098
Ormsby	2,129	51.60%	1,997	48.40%	132	3.20%	4,126
Pershing	738	60.29%	486	39.71%	252	20.58%	1,224
Storey	261	60.28%	172	39.72%	89	20.56%	433
Washoe	20,170	52.36%	18,350	47.64%	1,820	4.72%	38,520
White Pine	2,809	70.52%	1,174	29.48%	1,635	41.04%	3,983
Totals	79,339	58.58%	56,094	41.42%	23,245	17.16%	135,433

==== Counties that flipped from Republican to Democratic ====
- Eureka
- Ormsby
- Washoe

== See also ==
- United States presidential elections in Nevada
