= 1972 United States presidential election in Nevada =

- November 7, 1972

Nominee	Richard Nixon	George McGovern
Party	Republican	Democratic
Home state	California	South Dakota
Running mate	Spiro Agnew	Sargent Shriver
Electoral vote	3	0
Popular vote	115,750	66,016
Percentage	63.68%	36.32%
County results
Nixon
50–60%
60–70%
70–80%
President before election
Richard Nixon
Republican
Elected President
Richard Nixon
Republican

The 1972 United States presidential election in Nevada took place on November 7, 1972. All fifty states and the District of Columbia were part of the 1972 United States presidential election. State voters chose three electors to the Electoral College, who voted for president and vice president.

Since being won for the third time by William Jennings Bryan whose populism had attracted a state heavily dependent upon silver mining, Nevada had been a consistent bellwether swing state, although it had been trending Republican since World War II as air conditioning led to the development of Las Vegas as a “Sun Belt” city. Richard Nixon had narrowly lost this heavily Catholic state to John F. Kennedy in 1960, but would comfortably defeat both Hubert Humphrey and George Wallace in 1968. However, the Democrats had rebounded in 1970 to regain the governorship, although the party lost the attorney general position for the first time since 1890.

Nevada held no Democratic primary in 1972, and once South Dakota Senator George McGovern secured the nomination, every poll suggested that incumbent President Nixon would win the state very easily, typically by around a two-to-one margin.

Nixon carried Nevada with 63.68% of the vote to McGovern's 36.32%, a victory margin of 27.36%. In a state that would reflect McGovern's national results, the Democratic nominee did not win a single county in Nevada, making Nixon only the second Republican after Theodore Roosevelt in 1904 to sweep all Nevada's counties.

== Results ==
1972 United States presidential election in Nevada
Party	Candidate	Votes	%
Republican	Richard Nixon (incumbent)	115,750	63.68%
Democratic	George McGovern	66,016	36.32%
Total votes		181,766	100%

=== Results by county ===
County	Richard Nixon Republican		George McGovern Democratic		Margin		Total votes cast
County	#	%	#	%	#	%	Total votes cast
Carson City	5,396	71.79%	2,120	28.21%	3,276	43.58%	7,516
Churchill	2,970	74.10%	1,038	25.90%	1,932	48.20%	4,008
Clark	53,101	59.06%	36,807	40.94%	16,294	18.12%	89,908
Douglas	2,898	74.67%	983	25.33%	1,915	49.34%	3,881
Elko	3,886	72.59%	1,467	27.41%	2,419	45.18%	5,353
Esmeralda	273	68.25%	127	31.75%	146	36.50%	400
Eureka	371	72.75%	139	27.25%	232	45.50%	510
Humboldt	1,659	69.94%	713	30.06%	946	39.88%	2,372
Lander	798	63.03%	468	36.97%	330	26.06%	1,266
Lincoln	841	68.77%	382	31.23%	459	37.54%	1,223
Lyon	2,813	74.58%	959	25.42%	1,854	49.16%	3,772
Mineral	2,111	73.32%	768	26.68%	1,343	46.64%	2,879
Nye	1,287	61.61%	802	38.39%	485	23.22%	2,089
Pershing	853	70.03%	365	29.97%	488	40.06%	1,218
Storey	508	69.21%	226	30.79%	282	38.42%	734
Washoe	33,539	66.22%	17,106	33.78%	16,433	32.44%	50,645
White Pine	2,446	61.27%	1,546	38.73%	900	22.54%	3,992
Totals	115,750	63.68%	66,016	36.32%	49,734	27.36%	181,766

== See also ==
- United States presidential elections in Nevada
