= 1936 United States presidential election in Nevada =

- November 3, 1936

| Nominee | Franklin D. Roosevelt | Alf Landon |
| Party | Democratic | Republican |
| Home state | New York | Kansas |
| Running mate | John Nance Garner | Frank Knox |
| Electoral vote | 3 | 0 |
| Popular vote | 31,925 | 11,923 |
| Percentage | 72.81% | 27.19% |
County results
Roosevelt
50–60%
60–70%
70–80%
80–90%
President before election
Franklin D. Roosevelt
Democratic
Elected President
Franklin D. Roosevelt
Democratic

The 1936 United States presidential election in Nevada took place on November 3, 1936, as part of the 1936 United States presidential election. State voters chose three representatives, or electors, to the Electoral College, who voted for president and vice president.

Nevada was won by incumbent President Franklin D. Roosevelt (D–New York), running with Vice President John Nance Garner, with 72.81% of the popular vote, against Governor Alf Landon (R–Kansas), running with Frank Knox, with 27.19% of the popular vote.

To date, this is the last time Douglas County voted for a Democratic presidential candidate, and the last time a Democratic nominee won every single county in the state. No subsequent presidential candidate has matched Roosevelt's 72.81% share of the popular vote in Nevada. This was the first time ever that a presidential candidate won two terms by carrying all counties in Nevada in both instances.

== Results ==
General Election Results
| Party | Pledged to | Elector | Votes |
|---|---|---|---|
| Democratic Party | Franklin D. Roosevelt | Julian O. Epperson | 31,925 |
| Democratic Party | Franklin D. Roosevelt | Ira L. Winters | 31,892 |
| Democratic Party | Franklin D. Roosevelt | Theresa L. McGovern | 31,879 |
| Republican Party | Alf Landon | Marc C. Franzman | 11,923 |
| Republican Party | Alf Landon | Morley Griswold | 11,891 |
| Republican Party | Alf Landon | Art W. Ham | 11,818 |
| Votes cast (Note: Based on totals for highest elector on each ticket) | | | 43,848 |

=== Results by county ===
| County | Franklin Delano Roosevelt Democratic | | Alfred Mossman Landon Republican | | Margin | | Total votes cast (Note: Based on highest elector on each ticket) |
| County | # | % | # | % | # | % | Total votes cast |
|---|---|---|---|---|---|---|---|
| Churchill | 1,290 | 62.96% | 759 | 37.04% | 531 | 25.92% | 2,049 |
| Clark | 5,091 | 81.21% | 1,178 | 18.79% | 3,913 | 62.42% | 6,269 |
| Douglas | 466 | 57.39% | 346 | 42.61% | 120 | 14.78% | 812 |
| Elko | 2,888 | 73.06% | 1,065 | 26.94% | 1,823 | 46.12% | 3,953 |
| Esmeralda | 566 | 78.39% | 156 | 21.61% | 410 | 56.79% | 722 |
| Eureka | 396 | 68.75% | 180 | 31.25% | 216 | 37.50% | 576 |
| Humboldt | 1,210 | 75.63% | 390 | 24.38% | 820 | 51.25% | 1,600 |
| Lander | 585 | 71.17% | 237 | 28.83% | 348 | 42.34% | 822 |
| Lincoln | 1,639 | 86.58% | 254 | 13.42% | 1,385 | 73.16% | 1,893 |
| Lyon | 1,203 | 71.18% | 487 | 28.82% | 716 | 42.37% | 1,690 |
| Mineral | 778 | 76.73% | 236 | 23.27% | 542 | 53.45% | 1,014 |
| Nye | 1,495 | 76.31% | 464 | 23.69% | 1,031 | 52.63% | 1,959 |
| Ormsby | 745 | 58.29% | 533 | 41.71% | 212 | 16.59% | 1,278 |
| Pershing | 861 | 76.19% | 269 | 23.81% | 592 | 52.39% | 1,130 |
| Storey | 392 | 73.82% | 139 | 26.18% | 253 | 47.65% | 531 |
| Washoe | 9,514 | 68.58% | 4,358 | 31.42% | 5,156 | 37.17% | 13,872 |
| White Pine | 2,806 | 76.29% | 872 | 23.71% | 1,934 | 52.58% | 3,678 |
| Totals | 31,925 | 72.81% | 11,923 | 27.19% | 20,002 | 45.62% | 43,848 |

== See also ==
- United States presidential elections in Nevada
