= 1900 United States presidential election in Nevada =

- November 6, 1900

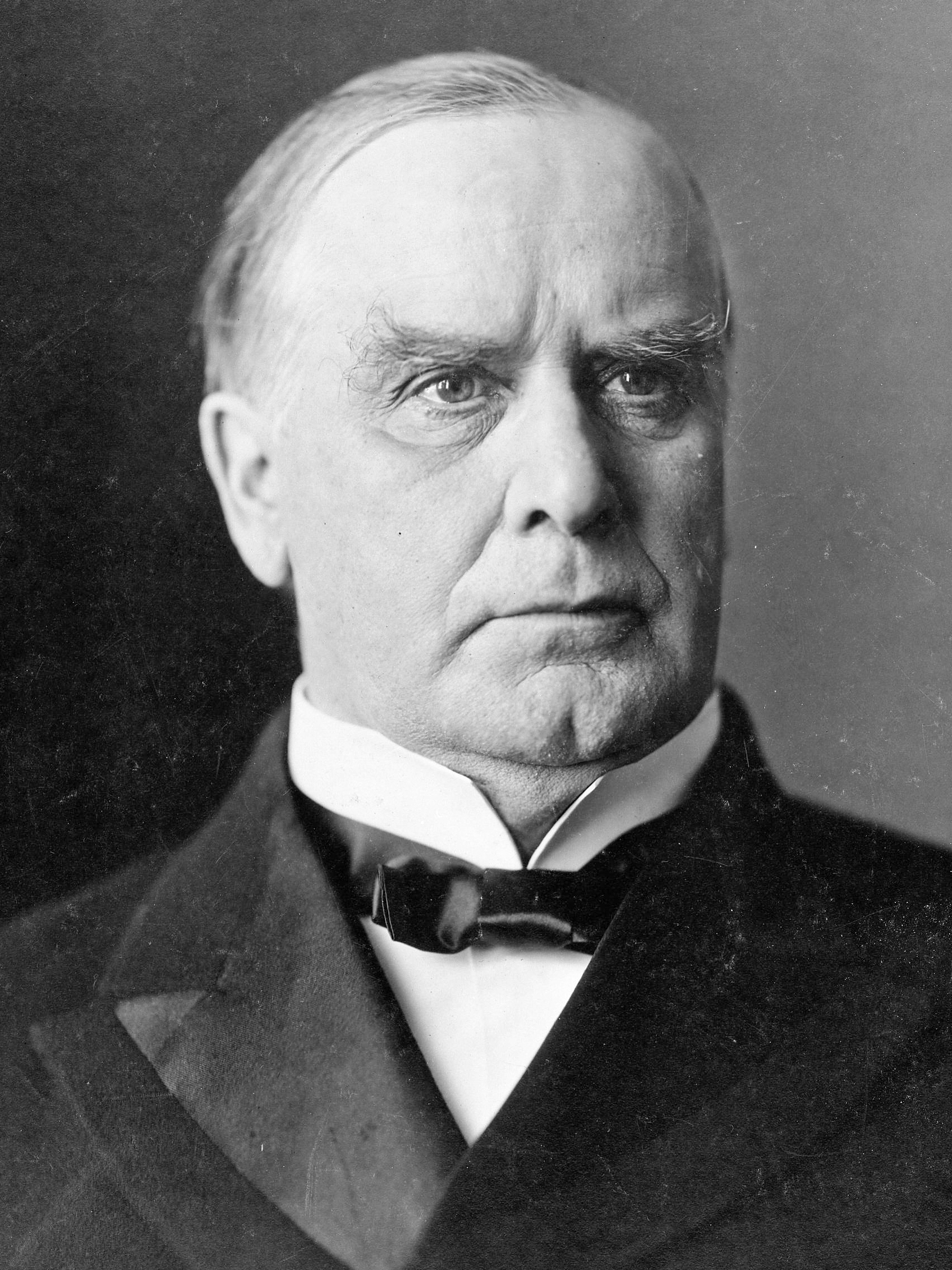
Nominee	William Jennings Bryan	William McKinley
Party	Democratic	Republican
Alliance	Silver
Home state	Nebraska	Ohio
Running mate	Adlai Stevenson I	Theodore Roosevelt
Electoral vote	3	0
Popular vote	6,347	3,849
Percentage	62.25%	37.75%
County results
Bryan
50–60%
60–70%
70–80%
80–90%
President before election
William McKinley
Republican
Elected President
William McKinley
Republican

The 1900 United States presidential election in Nevada took place on November 6, 1900. All contemporary 45 states were part of the 1900 United States presidential election. State voters chose three electors to the Electoral College, which selected the president and vice president.

Nevada was won by the Democratic nominees, former U.S. Representative William Jennings Bryan of Nebraska and his running mate Adlai Stevenson I of Illinois. They defeated the Republican nominees, incumbent President William McKinley and his running mate Theodore Roosevelt of New York. Bryan won the state by a margin of 24.5% and carried all 14 counties in the state for the second consecutive election.

Bryan had previously defeated McKinley in the state four years earlier, and would later defeat William Howard Taft in 1908.

== Results ==
General Election Results
Party	Pledged to	Elector	Votes
Democratic Party & Silver Party	William Jennings Bryan	John H. Dennis	6,347
Democratic Party & Silver Party	William Jennings Bryan	Richard Kirman	6,338
Democratic Party & Silver Party	William Jennings Bryan	John Weber	6,302
Republican Party	William McKinley	Simon Bray	3,849
Republican Party	William McKinley	D. B. Lyman	3,804
Republican Party	William McKinley	E. Strother	3,756
Votes cast (Note: Based on totals for highest elector on each ticket)			10,196

=== Results by county ===
County	William Jennings Bryan Democratic		William McKinley Republican		Margin		Total votes cast (Note: Based on highest elector on each ticket)
County	#	%	#	%	#	%	Total votes cast
Churchill	119	60.10%	79	39.90%	40	20.20%	198
Douglas	219	50.81%	212	49.19%	7	1.62%	431
Elko	860	64.37%	476	35.63%	384	28.74%	1,336
Esmeralda	289	69.81%	125	30.19%	164	39.61%	414
Eureka	389	76.27%	121	23.73%	268	52.55%	510
Humboldt	700	65.79%	364	34.21%	336	31.58%	1,064
Lander	325	69.30%	144	30.70%	181	38.59%	469
Lincoln	564	70.77%	233	29.23%	331	41.53%	797
Lyon	354	62.32%	214	37.68%	140	24.65%	568
Nye	190	85.59%	32	14.41%	158	71.17%	222
Ormsby	399	56.20%	311	43.80%	88	12.39%	710
Storey	609	57.24%	455	42.76%	154	14.47%	1,064
Washoe	1,005	52.23%	919	47.77%	86	4.47%	1,924
White Pine	325	66.46%	164	33.54%	161	32.92%	489
Totals	6,347	62.25%	3,849	37.75%	2,498	24.50%	10,196

== See also ==
- United States presidential elections in Nevada
