= 1896 United States presidential election in Nevada =

- November 3, 1896

Nominee	William Jennings Bryan	William McKinley
Party	Silver	Republican
Alliance	Democratic; Populist
Home state	Nebraska	Ohio
Running mate	Arthur Sewall (Democratic/Silver); Thomas E. Watson (Populist)	Garret Hobart
Electoral vote	3	0
Popular vote	8,376	1,938
Percentage	81.21%	18.79%
County results
Bryan
60–70%
70–80%
80–90%
90–100%
President before election
Grover Cleveland
Democratic
Elected President
William McKinley
Republican

The 1896 United States presidential election in Nevada took place on November 3, 1896. All contemporary 45 states were part of the 1896 United States presidential election. State voters chose three electors to the Electoral College, which selected the president and vice president.

Nevada was won by the Silver and Democratic nominees, former U.S. Representative William Jennings Bryan of Nebraska and his running mate Arthur Sewall of Maine. They defeated the Republican nominees, former Governor of Ohio William McKinley and his running mate Garret Hobart of New Jersey. Bryan won the state by a margin of 62.42%, which to date remains the strongest of any presidential nominee in the history of Nevada.

With 81.21% of the popular vote, Nevada would prove to be Bryan's fifth strongest state in the 1896 presidential election only after Mississippi, South Carolina, Colorado and neighboring Utah.

Bryan would later defeat McKinley in the state four years later and would also later defeat William Howard Taft in the state in 1908. This election was the first time ever that the presidential candidate that won Nevada carried all counties in Nevada. This was also the first time that Ormsby County backed a Democratic candidate.

== Results ==
General Election Results
Party	Pledged to	Elector	Votes
Democratic Party & Silver Party	William Jennings Bryan (Note: and Arthur Sewall for Vice President)	Benjamin F. Leete	7,802
Democratic Party & Silver Party	William Jennings Bryan	George Russell	7,758
Democratic Party & Silver Party	William Jennings Bryan	Joseph R. Ryan	7,722
Republican Party	William McKinley	Allen C. Bragg	1,938
Republican Party	William McKinley	J. A. Lewis	1,917
Republican Party	William McKinley	Z. Pierce	1,906
People's Party	William Jennings Bryan (Note: and Thomas E. Watson for Vice President)	Charles H. Steele	574
People's Party	William Jennings Bryan	George E. Peckham	549
People's Party	William Jennings Bryan	H. C. Dangberg	546
Votes cast (Note: Based on totals for highest elector on each ticket)			10,314

=== Results by county ===
	William J. Bryan Democratic-Silver		William J. Bryan Populist		William J. Bryan Total		William McKinley Republican		Margin		Total
County	#	%	#	%	#	%	#	%	#	%	Total
Churchill	153	75.36%	3	1.47%	156	76.85%	47	23.15%	109	53.69%	203
Douglas	180	40.90%	85	19.31%	265	60.23%	175	39.77%	90	20.45%	440
Elko	942	82.77%	69	6.06%	1,011	88.84%	127	11.16%	884	77.68%	1,138
Esmeralda	384	82.40%	13	2.79%	397	85.19%	69	14.81%	328	70.39%	466
Eureka	533	92.69%	20	3.48%	553	96.17%	22	3.83%	531	92.35%	575
Humboldt	715	84.41%	34	4.01%	749	88.43%	98	11.57%	651	76.86%	847
Lander	479	90.38%	15	2.83%	494	93.21%	36	6.79%	458	86.42%	530
Lincoln	813	92.70%	34	3.88%	847	96.58%	30	3.42%	817	93.16%	877
Lyon	450	75.63%	32	5.38%	482	81.01%	113	18.99%	369	62.02%	595
Nye	215	89.58%	13	5.42%	228	95.00%	12	5.00%	216	90.00%	240
Ormsby	550	64.71%	16	1.88%	566	66.59%	284	33.41%	282	33.18%	850
Storey	1,075	70.67%	74	4.87%	1,149	75.54%	372	24.46%	777	51.08%	1,521
Washoe	1,010	60.08%	158	9.40%	1,168	69.48%	513	30.52%	655	38.96%	1,681
White Pine	303	86.32%	8	2.28%	311	88.60%	40	11.40%	271	77.21%	351
Totals	7,802	75.64%	574	5.57%	8,376	81.21%	1,938	18.79%	6,438	62.42%	10,314

==== Counties that flipped from Populist to Democratic ====
- Churchill
- Elko
- Esmeralda
- Eureka
- Humboldt
- Lander
- Lincoln
- Lyon
- Nye
- Storey
- Washoe
- White Pine

==== Counties that flipped from Republican to Democratic ====
- Douglas
- Ormsby
