= 1988 United States presidential election in Nevada =

- November 8, 1988
- Turnout: 80.0% (of registered voters) ▼

| Nominee | George H. W. Bush | Michael Dukakis |
| Party | Republican | Democratic |
| Home state | Texas | Massachusetts |
| Running mate | Dan Quayle | Lloyd Bentsen |
| Electoral vote | 4 | 0 |
| Popular vote | 206,040 | 132,738 |
| Percentage | 58.86% | 37.92% |
County results
Bush
50–60%
60–70%
70–80%
No Data (Note: Bullfrog County, an enclave of Nye County extant from 1987 to 1989, had no population and thus recorded no votes.)
President before election
Ronald Reagan
Republican
Elected President
George H. W. Bush
Republican

The 1988 United States presidential election in Nevada took place on November 8, 1988. All 50 states and the District of Columbia, were part of the 1988 United States presidential election. State voters chose four electors to the Electoral College, which selected the president and vice president.

Nevada was won by incumbent United States Vice President George H. W. Bush of Texas, who was running against Massachusetts Governor Michael Dukakis. Bush ran with Indiana Senator Dan Quayle as vice president, and Dukakis ran with Texas Senator Lloyd Bentsen. Bush carried Nevada with 58.86% of the vote, while Dukakis received 37.92%, a victory margin of 20.94%.

Bush carried Nevada by a landslide margin of 21%, making the state 13.2% more Republican than the nation overall. He carried every county in the state, and both of Nevada's largest counties – Clark and Washoe – weighed in as more Republican than the nation. Only in one county, then-traditionally Democratic White Pine County, did Bush underperform his national vote share, and then only slightly. This was also the only county in which Dukakis cracked 40%, although in no county did he overperform his national vote share (with 'no candidate' garnering 4.9% of the vote in White Pine County).

The Mountain West had begun trending Republican in 1952; in that election, Eisenhower overperformed in Nevada as he did in the rest of the region, after it had unanimously voted for Truman in 1948. However, Nevada, along with New Mexico in the Mountain West, voted for Kennedy in 1960, and was competitive in 1976. 1980 marked a watershed in Nevada's Republican turn, as it voted 25.9% more Republican than the nation, the most to the right Nevada had voted since statehood. Nevada remained a strong 15.7% more Republican than the nation amid Reagan's national 1984 landslide, and remained more Republican than the nation by double digits in 1988. This was at the same time as some other Mountain West states, such as Colorado and Montana, wavered in the strength of their traditional Republicanism, amid the 1980s farm crisis.

Nevada, which had been a bellwether state for most of the 20th century (having voted for the winner of every election between its third vote for Bryan in 1908 and its vote for Ford in 1976), returned to being closer to the national median in 1992, as Bill Clinton, the national winner, narrowly carried it. It remained narrowly to the right of the country in both of Clinton's wins, but George W. Bush only narrowly carried it in his own two victories in 2000 and 2004. The election was rather multi-partisan, with more than 3% of the state voting for third parties or for Nevada's "None of These Candidates" option.

Nevada weighed in for this election as about 13% more Republican than the national average. This would be the third time in a row that Republicans swept every county in the state – however, it would become the last time (as of 2024) any presidential candidate did so, as this was the last election in which Clark County, the most populated county in Nevada and home to Las Vegas, was won by a Republican presidential candidate.

== Results ==
1988 United States presidential election in Nevada
| Party | Candidate | Votes | Percentage | Electoral votes |
|---|---|---|---|---|
| Republican | George H. W. Bush | 206,040 | 58.86% | 4 |
| Democratic | Michael Dukakis | 132,738 | 37.92% | 0 |
| | None of These Candidates | 6,934 | 1.98% | 0 |
| Libertarian | Ron Paul | 3,520 | 1.01% | 0 |
| New Alliance | Lenora Fulani | 835 | 0.24% | 0 |
| Totals | | 350,067 | 100.0% | 4 |

=== Results by county ===
| County | George H.W. Bush Republican | | Michael Dukakis Democratic | | None of These Candidates | | Ron Paul Libertarian | | Leonora Fulani New Alliance | | Margin | | Total votes cast |
| County | # | % | # | % | # | % | # | % | # | % | # | % | Total votes cast |
|---|---|---|---|---|---|---|---|---|---|---|---|---|---|
| Carson City | 9,701 | 63.44% | 5,088 | 33.27% | 276 | 1.80% | 195 | 1.28% | 31 | 0.20% | 4,613 | 30.17% | 15,291 |
| Churchill | 4,578 | 72.86% | 1,481 | 23.57% | 155 | 2.47% | 49 | 0.78% | 20 | 0.32% | 3,097 | 49.29% | 6,283 |
| Clark | 108,110 | 56.37% | 78,359 | 40.86% | 3,400 | 1.77% | 1,535 | 0.80% | 375 | 0.20% | 29,751 | 15.51% | 191,779 |
| Douglas | 7,074 | 67.02% | 3,107 | 29.44% | 214 | 2.03% | 135 | 1.28% | 25 | 0.24% | 3,967 | 37.58% | 10,555 |
| Elko | 5,722 | 68.35% | 2,310 | 27.59% | 220 | 2.63% | 96 | 1.15% | 24 | 0.29% | 3,412 | 40.76% | 8,372 |
| Esmeralda | 380 | 68.84% | 143 | 25.91% | 16 | 2.90% | 11 | 1.99% | 2 | 0.36% | 237 | 42.93% | 552 |
| Eureka | 413 | 70.96% | 151 | 25.95% | 11 | 1.89% | 7 | 1.20% | 0 | 0.00% | 262 | 45.01% | 582 |
| Humboldt | 2,378 | 66.50% | 1,024 | 28.64% | 87 | 2.43% | 65 | 1.82% | 22 | 0.62% | 1,354 | 37.86% | 3,576 |
| Lander | 1,214 | 70.83% | 439 | 25.61% | 35 | 2.04% | 21 | 1.23% | 5 | 0.29% | 775 | 45.22% | 1,714 |
| Lincoln | 1,035 | 66.18% | 466 | 29.80% | 45 | 2.88% | 9 | 0.58% | 9 | 0.58% | 569 | 36.38% | 1,564 |
| Lyon | 4,390 | 62.83% | 2,301 | 32.93% | 171 | 2.45% | 103 | 1.47% | 22 | 0.31% | 2,089 | 29.90% | 6,987 |
| Mineral | 1,480 | 56.88% | 978 | 37.59% | 101 | 3.88% | 20 | 0.77% | 23 | 0.88% | 502 | 19.29% | 2,602 |
| Nye | 3,619 | 64.59% | 1,748 | 31.20% | 143 | 2.55% | 78 | 1.39% | 15 | 0.27% | 1,871 | 33.39% | 5,603 |
| Pershing | 867 | 62.11% | 458 | 32.81% | 48 | 3.44% | 17 | 1.22% | 6 | 0.43% | 409 | 29.30% | 1,396 |
| Storey | 651 | 56.36% | 432 | 37.40% | 46 | 3.98% | 22 | 1.90% | 4 | 0.35% | 219 | 18.96% | 1,155 |
| Washoe | 52,654 | 59.34% | 32,902 | 37.08% | 1,803 | 2.03% | 1,137 | 1.28% | 232 | 0.26% | 19,752 | 22.26% | 88,728 |
| White Pine | 1,774 | 53.31% | 1,351 | 40.59% | 163 | 4.90% | 20 | 0.60% | 20 | 0.60% | 423 | 12.72% | 3,328 |
| Bullfrog | 0 | N/A | 0 | N/A | 0 | N/A | 0 | N/A | 0 | N/A | 0 | N/A | 0 |
| Totals | 206,040 | 58.86% | 132,738 | 37.92% | 6,934 | 1.98% | 3,520 | 1.01% | 835 | 0.24% | 73,302 | 20.94% | 350,067 |

== See also ==
- Presidency of George H. W. Bush
- United States presidential elections in Nevada
