= 2008 United States presidential election in Nevada =

- November 4, 2008

Nominee	Barack Obama	John McCain
Party	Democratic	Republican
Home state	Illinois	Arizona
Running mate	Joe Biden	Sarah Palin
Electoral vote	5	0
Popular vote	533,736	412,827
Percentage	55.15%	42.65%

Obama
40–50%
50–60%
60–70%
McCain
40–50%
50–60%
60–70%
70–80%
President before election
George W. Bush
Republican
Elected President
Barack Obama
Democratic

The 2008 United States presidential election in Nevada was part of the 2008 United States presidential election, which took place on November 4, 2008, throughout all 50 states and D.C. Voters chose five representatives, or electors to the Electoral College, who voted for president and vice president.

Democrat Barack Obama defeated Republican John McCain by 12.5 percentage points. Both candidates heavily campaigned in the state. Although Obama almost always led in polls, some argued that McCain, a nationally prominent senator from neighboring Arizona, had a legitimate chance of pulling off an upset in Nevada. Most news organizations considered Obama to be the favorite in the state, while many still viewed it as a relative swing state. In the previous four presidential elections, the margin of victory in Nevada had always been below 5 percentage points. George W. Bush carried the state twice in 2000 and 2004 while Bill Clinton narrowly won it in 1992 and in 1996. This was the first time since 1964 where a Democrat won an outright majority of the vote in Nevada. As of 2026, it is also the last time where the state was won by a double-digit margin.

As of the 2024 presidential election, this is the last time a Democratic candidate won Carson City, as well as the last time that a presidential candidate has carried the state by a double-digit margin. Obama's winning margin of over 120,000 votes is the largest in history for a presidential candidate in Nevada, with no one else ever winning by six figures.

== Primaries ==
- 2008 Nevada Republican caucuses
- 2008 Nevada Democratic caucuses

== Campaign ==
=== Predictions ===
There were 16 news organizations who made state-by-state predictions of the election. Here are their last predictions before election day:

Source	Ranking
D.C. Political Report	Likely R
Cook Political Report	Lean D (flip)
The Takeaway	Lean D (flip)
Electoral-vote.com	Lean D (flip)
Washington Post	Lean D (flip)
Politico	Lean D (flip)
RealClearPolitics	Lean D (flip)
FiveThirtyEight	Lean D (flip)
CQ Politics	Lean D (flip)
The New York Times	Lean D (flip)
CNN	Lean D (flip)
NPR	Lean D (flip)
MSNBC	Toss-up
Fox News	Toss-up
Associated Press	Toss-up
Rasmussen Reports	Toss-up

=== Polling ===
In the beginning of the general election, it was a dead heat. McCain did win several polls. However, since September 30, Obama swept every other poll taken in the state and tied one poll. The final 3 polls averaged 50% to 44% in favor of Obama. On election day, Obama won the state with 55% and by a double-digit margin of victory, a much better performance than polls showed.

=== Fundraising ===
John McCain raised a total of $1,980,771 in the state. Barack Obama raised $2,328,659.

=== Advertising and visits ===
Obama and his interest groups spent $9,622,022. McCain and his interest groups spent $6,184,427. Each campaign visited the state 7 times.

== Analysis ==
Nevada is historically somewhat of a bellwether state, having voted for the winner of every presidential election since 1912 except in 1976 and 2016. In 2008, McCain of neighboring Arizona was leading most polls taken March until the end of September (around the time of the 2008 financial crisis), when Obama of Illinois started taking the lead in almost every poll conducted from the beginning of October on, some in double digits. The subprime mortgage crisis was particularly catastrophic in Nevada, and McCain's statement that "the fundamentals of the economy are strong" soured his chances in a state devastated by the economic meltdown.

Obama ultimately carried Nevada by a 12.5-point margin, larger than most polls anticipated. His victory rested almost entirely on winning the state's three largest jurisdictions: Clark County, home to Las Vegas; Washoe County, which contains Reno; and the independent city of Carson City, which combine for 88% of Nevada's total population. Hispanics also played a large role in Obama's landslide victory. According to exit polling, they composed 15% of voters in Nevada and broke for Obama by a three-to-one margin. With their support, Obama carried Washoe County by a comfortable 12-point margin and a somewhat narrower one-point margin in Carson City. These two areas hadn't gone Democratic since Lyndon B. Johnson won them in 1964. Obama also won Clark County by double digits, the first time a Democrat did so since 1964. McCain ran up huge margins in most of the more rural counties, which have been solidly Republican ever since Richard Nixon's 1968 win. However, it was not nearly enough to overcome his deficit in Clark, Washoe and Carson City. Indeed, Obama's 122,000-vote margin in Clark County would have been enough by itself to carry the state, and Nevada voted more Democratic than the nation as a whole for the first time since 1960 and second since 1944.

At the same time, Democrats picked up a U.S. House seat in Nevada's 3rd Congressional District, which is based in Clark County and consists of most of the Las Vegas suburbs. Democratic State Senator Dina Titus defeated incumbent Republican Jon Porter by 5.14 points with several third parties receiving a small but significant proportion of the total statewide vote. At the state level, Democrats picked up one seat in the Nevada Assembly and picked up two seats in the Nevada Senate, giving the Democrats control of both chambers of the Nevada Legislature for the first time in decades.

As of the 2024 presidential election, this is the last time that Carson City voted for the Democratic candidate. This is the most recent election that Nevada trended more Democratic than the previous one.

== Results ==
2008 United States presidential election in Nevada
Party	Candidate	Running mate	Votes	Percentage	Electoral votes
Democratic	Barack Obama	Joe Biden	533,736	55.15%	5
Republican	John McCain	Sarah Palin	412,827	42.65%	0
None of these Candidates	None of these Candidates		6,267	0.65%	0
Independent	Ralph Nader	Matt Gonzalez	6,150	0.64%	0
Libertarian	Bob Barr	Wayne Allyn Root	4,263	0.44%	0
Constitution	Chuck Baldwin	Darrell Castle	3,194	0.33%	0
Green	Cynthia McKinney	Rosa Clemente	1,411	0.15%	0
Totals			967,848	100.00%	5
Voter turnout (Voting age population)					49.7%

=== By county ===
County	Barack Obama Democratic		John McCain Republican		Various candidates Other parties		Margin		Total votes cast
County	#	%	#	%	#	%	#	%	Total votes cast
Carson City	11,623	49.08%	11,419	48.22%	638	2.70%	204	0.86%	23,680
Churchill	3,494	32.95%	6,832	64.42%	279	2.63%	-3,338	-31.47%	10,605
Clark	380,765	58.47%	257,078	39.48%	13,329	2.05%	123,687	18.99%	651,172
Douglas	10,672	41.20%	14,648	56.55%	584	2.25%	-3,976	-15.35%	25,904
Elko	4,541	28.35%	10,969	68.47%	509	3.18%	-6,428	-40.12%	16,019
Esmeralda	104	23.69%	303	69.02%	32	7.29%	-199	-45.33%	439
Eureka	144	19.33%	564	75.70%	37	4.97%	-420	-56.37%	745
Humboldt	1,909	33.70%	3,586	63.31%	169	2.99%	-1,677	-29.61%	5,664
Lander	577	27.45%	1,466	69.74%	59	2.81%	-889	-42.29%	2,102
Lincoln	518	24.58%	1,498	71.10%	91	4.32%	-980	-46.52%	2,107
Lyon	8,405	39.83%	12,154	57.59%	544	2.58%	-3,749	-17.76%	21,103
Mineral	1,082	46.90%	1,131	49.02%	94	4.08%	-49	-2.12%	2,307
Nye	7,226	41.31%	9,537	54.53%	728	4.16%	-2,311	-13.22%	17,491
Pershing	673	36.66%	1,075	58.55%	88	4.79%	-402	-21.89%	1,836
Storey	1,102	45.57%	1,247	51.57%	69	2.86%	-145	-6.00%	2,418
Washoe	99,671	55.25%	76,880	42.61%	3,863	2.14%	22,791	12.64%	180,414
White Pine	1,230	32.01%	2,440	63.51%	172	4.48%	-1,210	-31.50%	3,842
Totals	533,736	55.15%	412,827	42.65%	21,285	2.20%	120,909	12.50%	967,848

Counties and independent cities that flipped from Republican to Democratic

- Carson City
- Washoe (largest municipality: Reno)

=== By congressional district ===
Barack Obama carried two of the state's three congressional districts.

District	McCain	Obama	Representative
1st	34.25%	63.68%	Shelley Berkley
2nd	48.79%	48.76%	Dean Heller
3rd	42.59%	55.35%	Jon Porter (110th Congress)
3rd	42.59%	55.35%	Dina Titus (111th Congress)

== Electors ==
Technically the voters of Nevada cast their ballots for electors: representatives to the Electoral College. Nevada is allocated 5 electors because it has 3 congressional districts and 2 senators. All candidates who appear on the ballot or qualify to receive write-in votes must submit a list of 5 electors, who pledge to vote for their candidate and their running mate. Whoever wins the majority of votes in the state is awarded all 5 electoral votes. Their chosen electors then vote for president and vice president. Although electors are pledged to their candidate and running mate, they are not obligated to vote for them. An elector who votes for someone other than their candidate is known as a faithless elector.

The electors of each state and the District of Columbia met on December 15, 2008, to cast their votes for president and vice president. The Electoral College itself never meets as one body. Instead the electors from each state and the District of Columbia met in their respective capitols.

The following were the members of the Electoral College from the state. All 5 were pledged to Barack Obama and Joe Biden:

1. Maggie Carlton
2. Tahis Castro
3. Ruby Duncan
4. Ron Hibble
5. Theresa Navarro

== See also ==
- United States presidential elections in Nevada
