= 2012 United States presidential election in Nevada =

- November 6, 2012

Nominee	Barack Obama	Mitt Romney
Party	Democratic	Republican
Home state	Illinois	Massachusetts
Running mate	Joe Biden	Paul Ryan
Electoral vote	6	0
Popular vote	531,373	463,567
Percentage	52.36%	45.68%

Obama
40–50%
50–60%
60–70%
Romney
50–60%
60–70%
70–80%
80–90%
President before election
Barack Obama
Democratic
Elected President
Barack Obama
Democratic

The 2012 United States presidential election in Nevada took place on November 6, 2012, as part of the 2012 United States presidential election in which all 50 states plus the District of Columbia participated. State voters chose six electors to represent them in the Electoral College via a popular vote pitting incumbent Democratic President Barack Obama and his running mate, Vice President Joe Biden, against Republican challenger and former Massachusetts Governor Mitt Romney and his running mate, Congressman Paul Ryan.

Nevada was won by President Barack Obama with 52.36% of the vote to Mitt Romney's 45.68%, a 6.68% margin of victory. In 2008, Obama won the state by 12.50%. Romney improved over John McCain's performance in 2008, but Obama still won the state by a comfortable margin. As of 2024, Obama remains the last major party candidate to win the state by more than 5%.

Nevada has voted for the winner in every presidential election from 1912 onwards, except in 1976 when it voted for Gerald Ford over Jimmy Carter and in 2016 when it voted for Hillary Clinton over Donald Trump. Carson City, which voted for Obama in 2008, flipped to supporting the Republican Party this election cycle. Despite only winning two counties (Clark and Washoe), these counties consist of over 87% of Nevada's population and are home to Las Vegas and Reno, the largest and third largest cities in the state, thus allowing Obama to win by a comfortable margin.

== Caucuses ==
=== Democratic caucuses ===
Incumbent president Barack Obama was not challenged for the Democratic candidacy, so no Democratic caucuses were held.

=== Republican caucuses ===
2012 Nevada Republican caucuses
- February 4, 2012

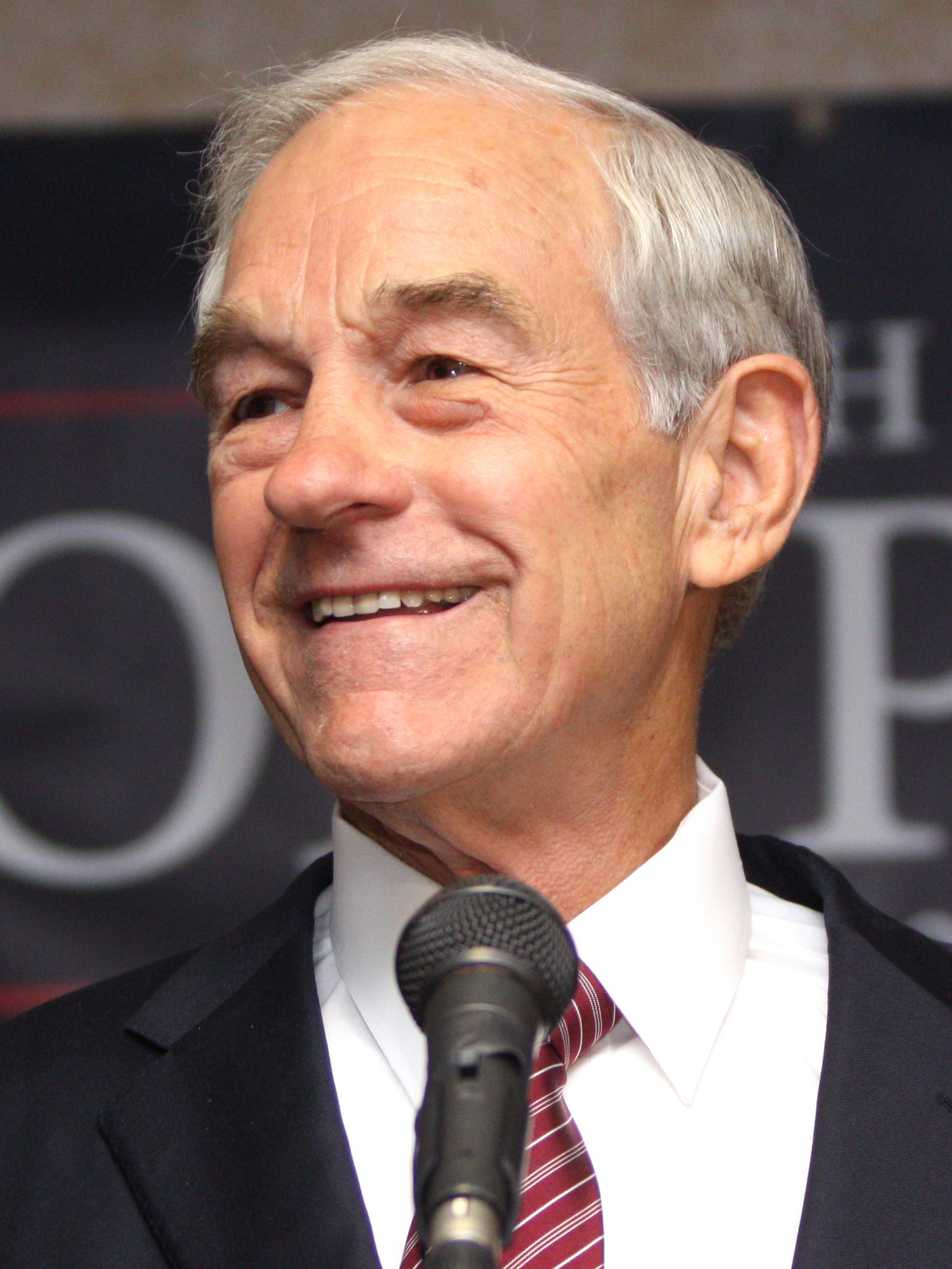

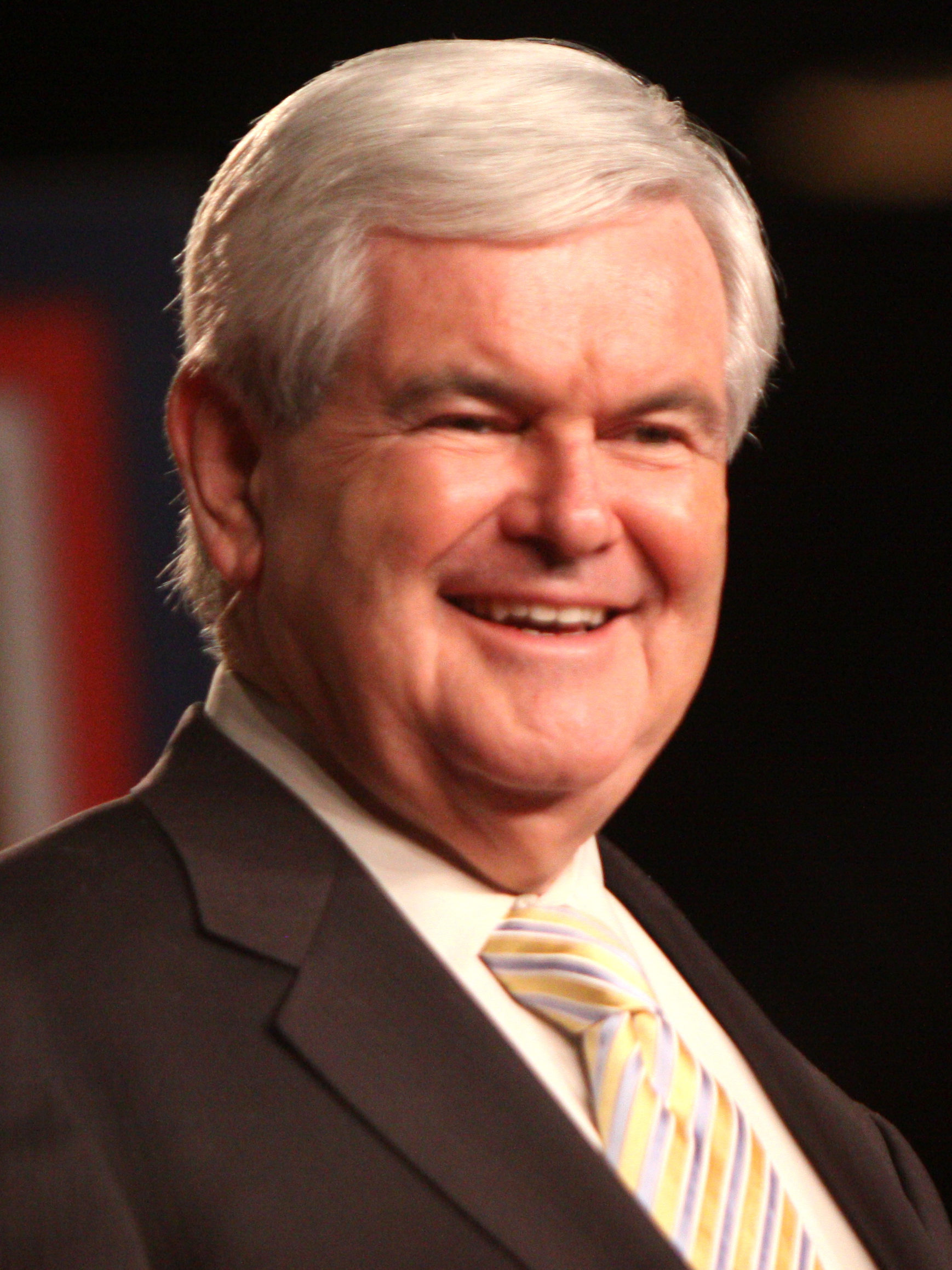

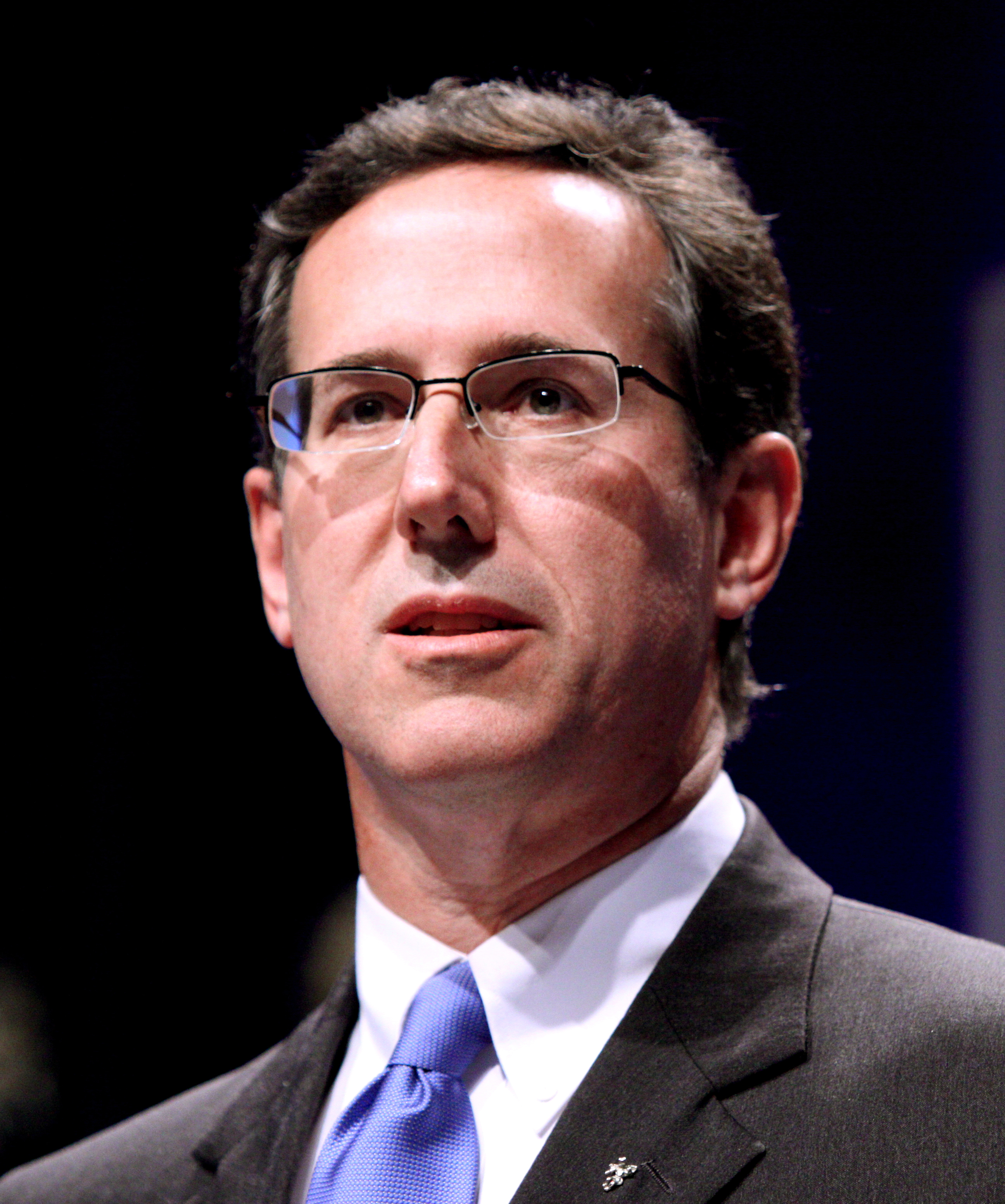
Candidate	Mitt Romney	Ron Paul
Home state	Massachusetts	Texas
Delegate count	20	8
Popular vote	16,486	6,175
Percentage	50.02%	18.73%
Candidate	Newt Gingrich	Rick Santorum
Home state	Georgia	Pennsylvania
Delegate count	0	0
Popular vote	6,956	3,277
Percentage	21.10%	9.94%
- Romney: 20–30% 30–40% 40–50% 50–60% 60–70% 80–90% Gingrich: 30–40% Paul: 30–40% 40–50%

The Republican caucuses were held on February 4, and they are closed caucuses. Mitt Romney was declared the winner.

There are 400,310 registered Republicans voting for 28 delegates.

==== Date ====
The 2012 Nevada Republican caucuses were originally scheduled to begin on February 18, 2012, much later than the date in 2008, which almost immediately followed the beginning of the year in January 2008. On September 29, 2011, the entire schedule of caucuses and primaries was disrupted, however, when it was announced that the Republican Party of Florida had decided to move up its primary to January 31, in an attempt to bring attention to its own primary contest, and attract the presidential candidates to visit the state. Because of the move, the Republican National Committee decided to strip Florida of half of its delegates. Also as a result, the Nevada Republican Party, along with Iowa, New Hampshire and South Carolina, then sought to move their caucuses back into early January. All but Nevada, who agreed to follow Florida, confirmed their caucus and primary dates to take place throughout January, with Nevada deciding to hold their contest on February 4, 2012.

The caucuses for 1,835 precincts in 125 sites were scheduled: voting from 9 AM - 1 PM, ballots handling 9-10 AM and to conclude by 3 PM at the latest on February 4, with results for almost all counties to be announced by the party at 5 PM.

==== Clark County ====
For Clark County, a special caucus was held at the Adelson Educational Campus at 7 PM, intended to accommodate those who observe Saturday Sabbath. According to Philip Kantor, an Orthodox Jew, the goal of the after-work caucus was to prevent electoral fraud "It has everything to do with not being deprived of a vote, being disenfranchised". This late caucus allowed a timely vote for Seventh-day Adventists, Orthodox Jews and other who don't vote until Sabbath is over. Adelson campus caucus attendees were required to sign affidavits stating that they had not already cast their ballot in an earlier caucus, that day. There was only one nationwide televised (by CNN) public vote-count. That Adelson caucus count provided the following Candidate vote results: Ron Paul 183, Mitt Romney 61, Newt Gingrich 57, and Rick Santorum 16 votes. The results of this special caucus were announced Feb 4. Paul got second place in Clark County, but Gingrich was ahead of Paul by a larger margin in the rest of the state and therefore ended up beating Paul statewide for second place.

==== Results ====
Turnout was 8.23%. 1,800 of 1,800 precincts (100%) reporting.
The voting-eligible population (400,310 registered Nevada Republicans).
125 caucus sites.

Delegates were awarded to candidates who got 3.57% or more of the vote proportionally

Nevada Republican caucuses, February 4, 2012
Candidate	Votes	Percentage	Projected delegate count			Actual Delegates
Candidate	Votes	Percentage	AP	CNN	MSNBC	Actual Delegates
Mitt Romney	16,486	50.02%	14	14	14	20
Newt Gingrich	6,956	21.10%	6	6	6	0
Ron Paul	6,175	18.73%	5	5	5	8
Rick Santorum	3,277	9.94%	3	3	3	0
No Vote	67	0.20%	0	0	0	0
Unprojected delegates:			0	0	0	0
Total:	32,961	100%	28	28	28	28

This final result was announced by Twitter and the Nevada Republican Party on Monday February 6, at 01:01 am PST (local time). The actual Republican National Convention delegates from Nevada are mostly Ron Paul supporters (22 of 28), which were elected by state convention on May 6. The Nevada Republican Party's rules state that most elected delegates to the RNC are still bound to vote for Romney (in the first round of voting), because of Romney's statewide caucuses winning.

Nevada State Convention Delegates May 6, 2012
Candidate	Supporters for this candidate who are Delegates from NV to the RNC
Ron Paul	22
Mitt Romney	6
Totals:	28

==== Controversy ====
Allegations of voter fraud have arisen due to a recount of Clark County ballots despite there being no official contest from any of the campaigns. One reason given by the GOP was that there were more ballots cast than people "signed in" at some precincts.

== General election ==
=== Candidate ballot access ===
- Mitt Romney/Paul Ryan, Republican
- Barack Obama/Joseph Biden, Democratic
- Gary Johnson/James P. Gray, Libertarian
- Virgil Goode/Jim Clymer, Constitution

=== Polling ===
Throughout the race, Barack Obama tied or won every single pre-election poll except one. The final poll showed Obama leading 51% to 47%, while the average of the last 3 polls showed Obama leading Romney 50% to 47%.

=== Predictions ===
Source	Ranking	As of
Huffington Post	Lean D	November 6, 2012
CNN	Tossup	November 6, 2012
New York Times	Lean D	November 6, 2012
Washington Post	Tossup	November 6, 2012
RealClearPolitics	Tossup	November 6, 2012
Sabato's Crystal Ball	Likely D	November 5, 2012
FiveThirtyEight	Solid D	November 6, 2012

=== Results ===
2012 United States presidential election in Nevada
Party	Candidate	Running mate	Votes	Percentage	Electoral votes
Democratic	Barack Obama (incumbent)	Joe Biden (incumbent)	531,373	52.36%	6
Republican	Mitt Romney	Paul Ryan	463,567	45.68%	0
Libertarian	Gary Johnson	Jim Gray	10,968	1.08%	0
Other/None			5,770	0.57%	0
Constitution	Virgil Goode	Jim Clymer	3,240	0.32%	0
Total			1,014,918	100%	

==== By county ====
County	Barack Obama Democratic		Mitt Romney Republican		Various candidates Other parties		Margin		Total votes cast
County	#	%	#	%	#	%	#	%	Total votes cast
Carson City	10,291	44.13%	12,394	53.15%	634	2.72%	-2,103	-9.02%	23,319
Churchill	2,961	28.85%	7,061	68.79%	243	2.36%	-4,100	-39.94%	10,265
Clark	389,936	56.42%	289,053	41.82%	12,201	1.76%	100,883	14.60%	691,190
Douglas	9,297	35.65%	16,276	62.42%	502	1.93%	-6,979	-26.77%	26,075
Elko	3,511	21.96%	12,014	75.15%	461	2.89%	-8,503	-53.19%	15,986
Esmeralda	92	21.15%	317	72.87%	26	5.98%	-225	-51.72%	435
Eureka	107	13.24%	663	82.05%	38	4.71%	-556	-68.81%	808
Humboldt	1,737	30.24%	3,810	66.33%	197	3.43%	-2,073	-36.09%	5,744
Lander	534	24.67%	1,580	72.98%	51	2.35%	-1,046	-48.31%	2,165
Lincoln	400	18.59%	1,691	78.58%	61	2.83%	-1,291	-59.99%	2,152
Lyon	7,380	34.38%	13,520	62.99%	565	2.63%	-6,140	-28.61%	21,465
Mineral	863	42.41%	1,080	53.07%	92	4.52%	-217	-10.66%	2,035
Nye	6,320	36.07%	10,566	60.30%	636	3.63%	-4,246	-24.23%	17,522
Pershing	632	33.55%	1,167	61.94%	85	4.51%	-535	-28.39%	1,884
Storey	920	39.76%	1,321	57.09%	73	3.15%	-401	-17.33%	2,314
Washoe	95,409	50.79%	88,453	47.09%	3,993	2.12%	6,956	3.70%	187,855
White Pine	983	26.54%	2,601	70.22%	120	3.24%	-1,618	-43.68%	3,704
Totals	531,373	52.36%	463,567	45.68%	19,978	1.97%	67,806	6.68%	1,014,918

Counties that flipped from Democratic to Republican

- Carson City

==== By congressional district ====
Obama won three of four congressional districts, including one that elected a Republican.

District	Obama	Romney	Representative
1st	65.64%	32.4%	Dina Titus
2nd	44.82%	52.88%	Mark Amodei
3rd	49.53%	48.73%	Joe Heck
4th	54.43%	43.71%	Steven Horsford

== Analysis ==
Nevada has historically been a swing state. It has voted for the winner of every presidential election since 1912, except for 1976 and 2016. From 1992 to 2004, the margin of victory was always under five points. In 2008, however, the state swung over dramatically to support Obama, who carried it by 12.49%.

In 2012, Obama held onto Nevada, though by a narrower margin of 6.68%. This was due almost entirely to Obama carrying the state's two largest counties–Clark County, home to Las Vegas and Henderson, and Washoe County, home to Reno. These two counties account for 85% of Nevada's population. Romney dominated the state's rural counties, which have supported Republicans for decades. However, the only large jurisdiction he carried was the independent city of Carson City.

As in 2008, Obama owed his victory in part to the state's Hispanic voters breaking heavily for him. According to exit polls, Hispanics made up 19% of the electorate and voted for Obama by almost three-to-one.

== See also ==
- 2012 Republican Party presidential debates and forums
- 2012 Republican Party presidential primaries
- Results of the 2012 Republican Party presidential primaries
- United States presidential elections in Nevada
- Nevada Republican Party
