= 2004 United States presidential election in Nevada =

- November 2, 2004
- Turnout: 77.5% (of registered voters); 50.0% (of voting age population)

Nominee	George W. Bush	John Kerry
Party	Republican	Democratic
Home state	Texas	Massachusetts
Running mate	Dick Cheney	John Edwards
Electoral vote	5	0
Popular vote	418,690	397,190
Percentage	50.47%	47.88%

Bush
40–50%
50–60%
60–70%
70–80%
Kerry
50–60%
President before election
George W. Bush
Republican
Elected President
George W. Bush
Republican

The 2004 United States presidential election in Nevada took place on November 2, 2004, and was part of the 2004 United States presidential election. Voters chose five representatives, or electors to the Electoral College, who voted for president and vice president.

Nevada was won by incumbent President George W. Bush with a 2.59% margin of victory. This made the state 0.13% to the right of the nation at-large and the closest to the national results. A number of media outlets called Nevada for Bush, declared him re-elected for a second term. Prior to the election, news organizations who made predictions were split on whether Nevada was a swing state or leaned towards Bush. Kerry won just one county of the state—Clark County, Nevada's most populous county, and home to Las Vegas. Kerry's second-best performance in the state was in Washoe County, Nevada's next-most populated county, which he lost with 47% of the vote. Moreover, Nevada at the time had voted for the winner of every presidential election since 1912, except for 1976. Independent and third-party candidates collectively won 1.7% of the vote; among this group, Ralph Nader received the greatest share, garnering 0.58%.

This was the last time that Nevada was carried by the Republican nominee until Donald Trump did so in 2024, and remains the last time that a Republican has carried Washoe County. Nevada, still considered a swing state, would vote for the Democratic nominee in every subsequent election in between 2008 and 2020, albeit sometimes by narrow margins.

== Caucuses ==
- 2004 Nevada Democratic caucuses

== Campaign ==
=== Predictions ===
There were 12 news organizations who made state-by-state predictions of the election. Here are their last predictions before election day.

Source	Ranking
D.C. Political Report	Lean R
Associated Press	Toss-up
CNN	Likely R
Cook Political Report	Toss-up
Newsweek	Lean R
New York Times	Lean R
Rasmussen Reports	Toss-up
Research 2000	Lean R
Washington Post	Toss-up
Washington Times	Solid R
Zogby International	Likely D (flip)
Washington Dispatch	Likely R

=== Polling ===
Bush trailed in only one pre-election poll throughout the general election. By the fall, Bush pulled away and reached 50%. However, in the last week, some voters changed their preferences against Bush, resulting in his polling margin falling slightly. An average of the final three polls before Election Day showed Bush leading 49% to 47%.

=== Fundraising ===
Bush raised $2,296,762. Kerry raised $793,504.

=== Advertising and visits ===
Bush visited the state 3 times, while Kerry visited Nevada 6 times. Both of them visited the same places: Las Vegas and Reno. Almost every week, the candidates combined spent over $1 million in advertising.

== Analysis ==
In 2000, Bush had won Nevada by only 3.54%, despite that it had been Bill Clinton's second-closest win in 1996. He also fell slightly short of an outright majority. Hence, he was thought by many observers to be vulnerable in the state, which had voted Republican for six elections in a row between 1968 and 1988 before Bill Clinton.

In the end, Bush improved his vote share to just over a majority, although his margin narrowed to 2.59%, due to Kerry improving over Gore by a greater amount than Bush improved over his own prior performance. In particular, Bush's vote share actually fell slightly in Washoe County, the state's second-largest county and its largest red county in both 2000 and 2004. Washoe County had given the Republican nominee its biggest raw-vote margin in the state in every election from 1944 through 2000 save 1964 (when this distinction went to smaller Douglas County) and the three elections of the 1980s (when it went to larger Clark County). In 2004, the 'Cow County' of Elko County displaced Washoe County as the county giving Bush his biggest raw-vote margin in Nevada.

However, Bush performed strongly in Nevada's Cow Counties (its 14 counties apart from Clark, Washoe, and Carson City), winning over 60% of the vote in Douglas and Lyon Counties, over 70% in Churchill County, and over 75% in Elko County (where he received the highest vote share of any nominee since William Jennings Bryan in 1896). He also did well in Nye County, another of the larger Cow Counties, getting 58.5%, an improvement of 1.8% over four years prior. And he managed to keep Clark County from being a blowout, holding Kerry to a 4.9% margin there. Together with his limiting his backslide in Washoe, this was enough to give Bush another win in Nevada. This would be the last time until 2024 that Nevada had voted Republican.

Despite winning all but one of state's counties, Bush performed less consistently in Nevada's congressional districts, where he won two of the three—one of them by just a single percentage point.

Despite Bush winning the state, incumbent Senate Minority Whip Harry Reid won reelection.

== Results ==
2004 United States presidential election in Nevada
Party	Candidate	Votes	Percentage	Electoral votes
Republican	George W. Bush (incumbent)	418,690	50.47%	5
Democratic	John Kerry	397,190	47.88%	0
Independent	Ralph Nader	4,838	0.58%	0
N/A	None of these Candidates	3,688	0.44%	0
Libertarian	Michael Badnarik	3,176	0.38%	0
American Independent	Michael Peroutka	1,152	0.14%	0
Green	David Cobb	853	0.10%	0
Totals		829,587	100.00%	5
Voter turnout (Voting age population)				50.0%

=== By county ===
County	George W. Bush Republican		John Kerry Democratic		Various candidates Other parties		Margin		Total
County	#	%	#	%	#	%	#	%	Total
Carson City	13,171	57.00%	9,441	40.86%	494	2.14%	3,730	16.14%	23,106
Churchill	7,335	71.65%	2,705	26.42%	197	1.92%	4,630	45.23%	10,237
Clark	255,337	46.82%	281,767	51.66%	8,293	1.52%	-26,430	-4.84%	545,397
Douglas	15,192	63.57%	8,275	34.63%	431	1.80%	6,917	28.94%	23,898
Elko	11,938	77.98%	3,050	19.92%	321	2.10%	8,888	58.06%	15,309
Esmeralda	367	76.30%	99	20.58%	15	3.12%	268	55.72%	481
Eureka	571	77.37%	144	19.51%	23	3.12%	427	57.86%	738
Humboldt	3,896	72.59%	1,361	25.36%	110	2.05%	2,535	47.23%	5,367
Lander	1,602	78.03%	414	20.17%	37	1.80%	1,188	57.86%	2,053
Lincoln	1,579	77.14%	418	20.42%	50	2.44%	1,161	56.72%	2,047
Lyon	11,136	64.93%	5,637	32.87%	378	2.20%	5,499	32.06%	17,151
Mineral	1,336	57.41%	931	40.01%	60	2.58%	405	17.40%	2,327
Nye	8,487	58.49%	5,616	38.70%	407	2.80%	2,871	19.79%	14,510
Pershing	1,341	69.95%	538	28.06%	38	1.98%	803	41.89%	1,917
Storey	1,253	57.80%	871	40.18%	44	2.03%	382	17.62%	2,168
Washoe	81,545	51.26%	74,841	47.05%	2,693	1.69%	6,704	4.21%	159,079
White Pine	2,604	68.49%	1,082	28.46%	116	3.05%	1,522	40.03%	3,802
Totals	418,690	50.47%	397,190	47.88%	13,707	1.65%	21,500	2.59%	829,587

=== By congressional district ===
Bush won two of three congressional districts.

District	Bush	Kerry	Representative
1st	42%	57%	Shelley Berkley
2nd	57%	41%	Jim Gibbons
3rd	50%	49%	Jon Porter

== Electors ==
Technically speaking, the voters of Nevada cast their ballots for electors: representatives to the Electoral College. Nevada is allocated 5 electors because it has 3 congressional districts and 2 senators. All candidates who appear on the ballot or qualify to receive write-in votes must submit a list of 5 electors, who pledge to vote for their candidate and their running mate. Whoever wins the majority of votes in the state is awarded all 5 electoral votes. Their chosen electors then vote for president and vice president. Although electors are pledged to their candidate and running mate, they are not obligated to vote for them. An elector who votes for someone other than their candidate is known as a faithless elector.

The electors of each state and the District of Columbia met on December 13, 2004, to cast their votes for president and vice president. The Electoral College itself never meets as one body. Instead, the electors from each state and the District of Columbia met in their respective capitols.

The following were the members of the Electoral College from Nevada. All 5 were voted for Bush/Cheney, to whom they were unanimously pledged:

1. Joe Brown
2. Milton Schwartz
3. John Marvel
4. Beverly Willard
5. Paul Willis

== See also ==
- United States presidential elections in Nevada
