= 1980 United States presidential election in Nevada =

- November 4, 1980
- Turnout: 84.6% (of registered voters); 48.15% (of eligible voters)

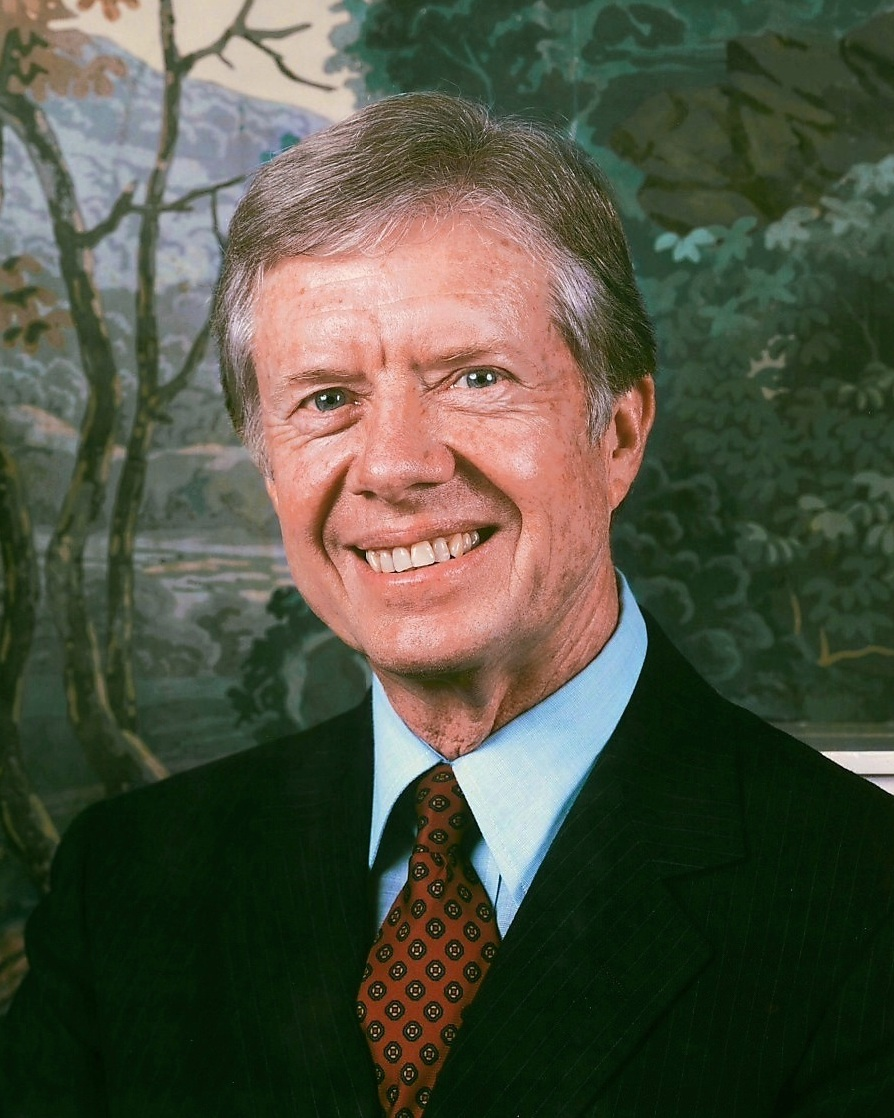

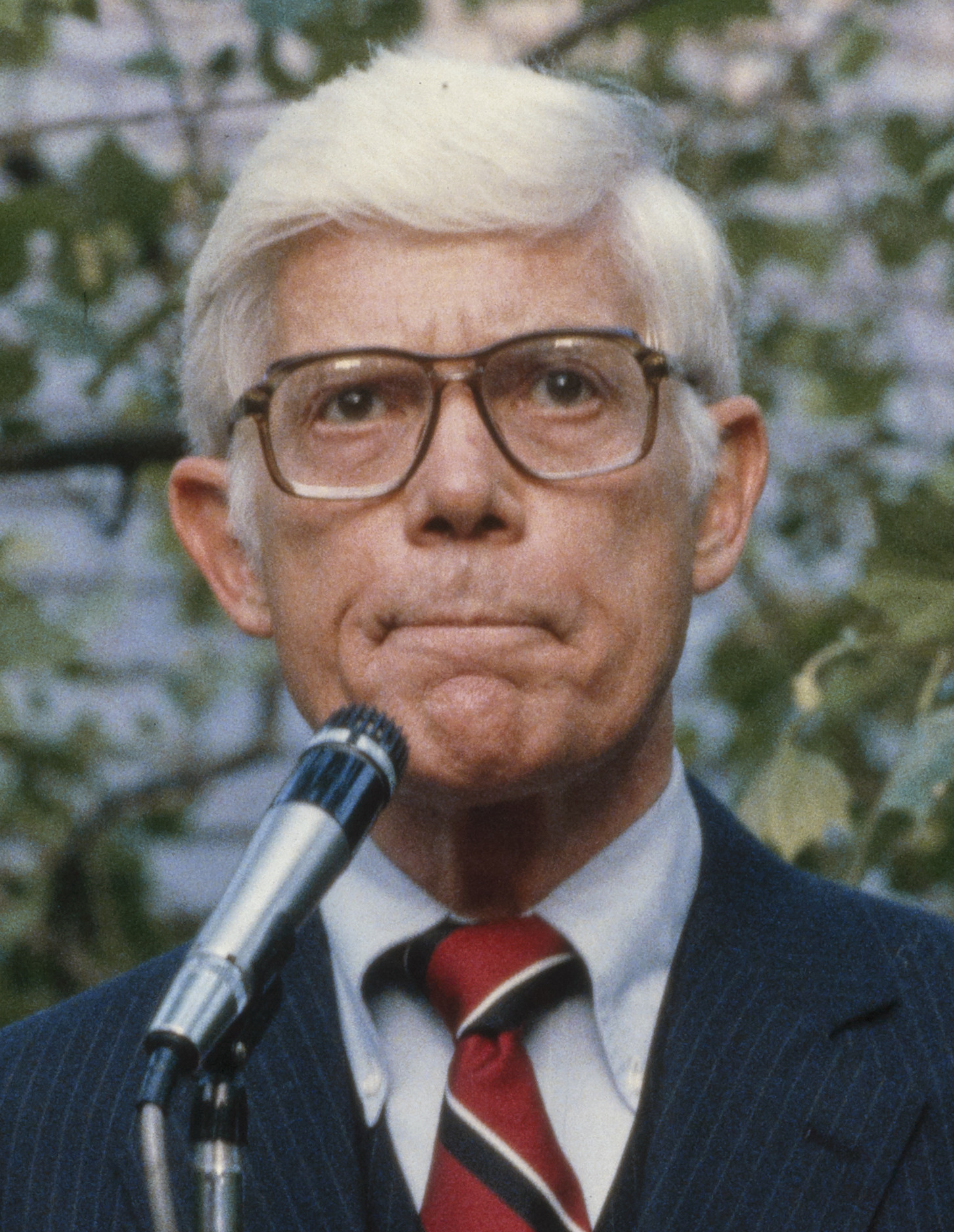
Nominee	Ronald Reagan	Jimmy Carter	John B. Anderson
Party	Republican	Democratic	Independent
Home state	California	Georgia	Illinois
Running mate	George H. W. Bush	Walter Mondale	Patrick Lucey
Electoral vote	3	0	0
Popular vote	155,017	66,666	17,651
Percentage	62.54%	26.89%	7.12%
County results
Reagan
50–60%
60–70%
70–80%
President before election
Jimmy Carter
Democratic
Elected President
Ronald Reagan
Republican

The 1980 United States presidential election in Nevada took place on November 4, 1980. All 50 states and The District of Columbia were part of the 1980 United States presidential election. State voters chose three electors to the Electoral College, who voted for president and vice president.

Nevada was won by former California Governor Ronald Reagan (R), who won the state with a 36-point landslide. Reagan's margin of victory was especially impressive as four years earlier, Nevada had been a swing state, only going for Ford by a narrow 4.36%. Nevada swung nearly 32 points to towards the Republicans this election.

Likely owing to criticism of Carter for his inability to understand specifically Western issues, mainly the region's problems with water supply, Reagan won the state handily. Starting with this election, the winner of every presidential election won Nevada until 2016. Nevada came out 26% more Republican than the nation at-large.

In July of that year, Reagan campaigned with Republican House of Representatives candidate Vince Saunders. Despite this, in the House of Representatives election, Democrat James David Santini won with more than 70% of the vote.

== Primaries ==
1980 Democratic Primary
Candidate	Votes	Delegates
Jimmy Carter (incumbent)	25,159	5
Ted Kennedy	19,296	4
Uncommitted	22,493	5
Totals	66,948	14

1980 Republican Primary
Candidate	Votes	Delegates
Ronald Reagan	39,352	18
George H.W. Bush	3,078	0
Uncommitted	4,965	2
Totals	47,395	20

== Results ==
1980 United States Presidential Election in Nevada
Party	Candidate	Votes	%
Republican	Ronald Reagan	155,017	62.54%
Democratic	Jimmy Carter (inc.)	66,666	26.89%
Independent	John Anderson	17,651	7.12%
Libertarian	Edward E. Clark	4,358	1.76%
	None of These Candidates	4,193	1.69%
Total votes		247,885	100%

=== Results by county ===
County	Ronald Reagan Republican		Jimmy Carter Democratic		John B. Anderson Independent		Ed Clark Libertarian		None of These Candidates		Margin		Total
County	#	%	#	%	#	%	#	%	#	%	#	%	Total
Carson City	8,389	66.81%	2,769	22.05%	964	7.68%	218	1.74%	216	1.72%	5,620	44.76%	12,556
Churchill	3,841	72.84%	1,055	20.01%	257	4.87%	46	0.87%	74	1.40%	2,786	52.83%	5,273
Clark	76,194	59.80%	38,313	30.07%	8,702	6.83%	2,092	1.64%	2,123	1.67%	37,881	29.73%	127,424
Douglas	5,254	71.55%	1,352	18.41%	511	6.96%	131	1.78%	95	1.29%	3,902	53.14%	7,343
Elko	4,393	70.89%	1,296	20.91%	301	4.86%	119	1.92%	88	1.42%	3,097	49.98%	6,197
Esmeralda	311	66.31%	110	23.45%	29	6.18%	11	2.35%	8	1.71%	201	42.86%	469
Eureka	430	76.24%	103	18.26%	13	2.30%	7	1.24%	11	1.95%	327	57.98%	564
Humboldt	1,950	68.59%	684	24.06%	128	4.50%	42	1.48%	39	1.37%	1,266	44.53%	2,843
Lander	935	65.61%	361	25.33%	64	4.49%	35	2.46%	30	2.11%	574	40.28%	1,425
Lincoln	1,087	68.54%	396	24.97%	38	2.40%	30	1.89%	35	2.21%	691	43.57%	1,586
Lyon	3,709	67.98%	1,288	23.61%	271	4.97%	115	2.11%	73	1.34%	2,421	44.37%	5,456
Mineral	1,628	63.94%	631	24.78%	147	5.77%	53	2.08%	87	3.42%	997	39.16%	2,546
Nye	2,387	64.17%	973	26.16%	204	5.48%	77	2.07%	79	2.12%	1,414	38.01%	3,720
Pershing	877	68.41%	311	24.26%	60	4.68%	16	1.25%	18	1.40%	566	44.15%	1,282
Storey	460	58.75%	222	28.35%	62	7.92%	25	3.19%	14	1.79%	238	30.40%	783
Washoe	41,276	63.54%	15,621	24.05%	5,705	8.78%	1,245	1.92%	1,109	1.71%	25,655	39.49%	64,956
White Pine	1,896	54.77%	1,181	34.11%	195	5.63%	96	2.77%	94	2.72%	715	20.66%	3,462
Totals	155,017	62.54%	66,666	26.89%	17,651	7.12%	4,358	1.76%	4,193	1.69%	88,351	35.65%	247,885

==== Counties that flipped from Democratic to Republican ====
- Clark
- Esmeralda
- Nye
- Mineral
- Storey
- White Pine

== See also ==
- United States presidential elections in Nevada
