= W. Frank Stewart =

American politician

Wellington Frank Stewart

Nevada State Senator for Storey County
- In office 1876–1880

Personal details
- Party: Democratic
- Occupation: Silver mine operator

Wellington Frank Stewart, also known as W. Frank Stewart (dates and places of birth and death missing), was a silver mining operator in Storey County in western Nevada, who served as a Democrat in the Nevada State Senate from 1876 to 1880. In 1969, the actor Dick Simmons was cast as Stewart in the episode "How to Beat a Badman" of the syndicated television series Death Valley Days.
