= Virginia City Highlands, Nevada =

Unincorporated community in Nevada, US

- Unincorporated community
- Location within Nevada Location within the United States
- Coordinates: 39°22′51″N 119°38′38″W
- Country: United States
- State: Nevada
- County: Storey
- Elevation: 5,984 ft (1,824 m)

Virginia City Highlands is an unincorporated community north of Virginia City, Nevada, United States, straddling the Storey County and Washoe County border. The community consists of widely dispersed residences. It can be accessed by Cartwright Road and Lousetown Road off Nevada State Route 341.

== History ==
In 1957, Curtiss-Wright purchased land in Storey and Washoe Counties from the Bureau of Land Management for a rocket testing area. At that time, Curtiss-Wright allowed ranchers to graze horses on the land. Because the land was privately held, it was exempt from the Wild and Free-Roaming Horses and Burros Act of 1971.

In 1971, Carlsberg Financial Company purchased 25,000 acres from Curtiss-Wright. At that time, the only development was a wild horse sanctuary. Plans were filed for 426 10 to 15 acre lots.

In January 1972, the Lake Tahoe Recreational Land Company filed a $10 million lawsuit against Joe Conforte (owner of the Mustang Ranch) and the Storey County District Attorney Virgil Bucchianeri. The lawsuit alleged that Conforte had threatened to use his political power to stop the development of 20,000 acres in Storey County unless Conforte was given 300 acres. The lawsuit also alleged that Conforte and Bucchianeri conspired to convince the Storey County Commission to vote against the development. The lawsuit was dismissed in February 1972 and later refiled with an unknown outcome.

In 1972, building in Virginia City Highlands started after a court battle with Storey County changed from 1 acre lots to the current set of lots. At that time, the issue was problems with the aquifer. In 1999, the area consisted of 24 square miles of 40-acre lots, 506 10-acre lots and 1,069 one acre lots.

From 1971 until 1978 horses that had been on the private land were not rounded up. In 1978, the Nevada Brand Inspectors Office decided that some of the horses in the area were owned by the wranglers who had used the area before 1971. In 1978, a controversial roundup occurred, where a helicopter was used by the wranglers to collect 227 branded and unbranded horses on private property. During the roundup, two horses died and another horse died later at the stockyard. An estimated 1,500 horses were not rounded up. Some of the rounded-up horses were sold to eventually be saddle horses, the culls were sent to an Olympia, Washington, slaughterhouse for overseas consumption by humans. In 1980, 37,440 acres were declared to be a wild horse reserve and wildlife sanctuary by the then newly formed Virginia Range Wildlife Protection Association, which was founded in part by the homeowners associations in the Virginia City Highlands. In 1980, the wranglers who conducted the 1978 roundup said that they had the right to roundup their horses on private land.
