= Storey County, Nevada =

County in Nevada, United States

- County
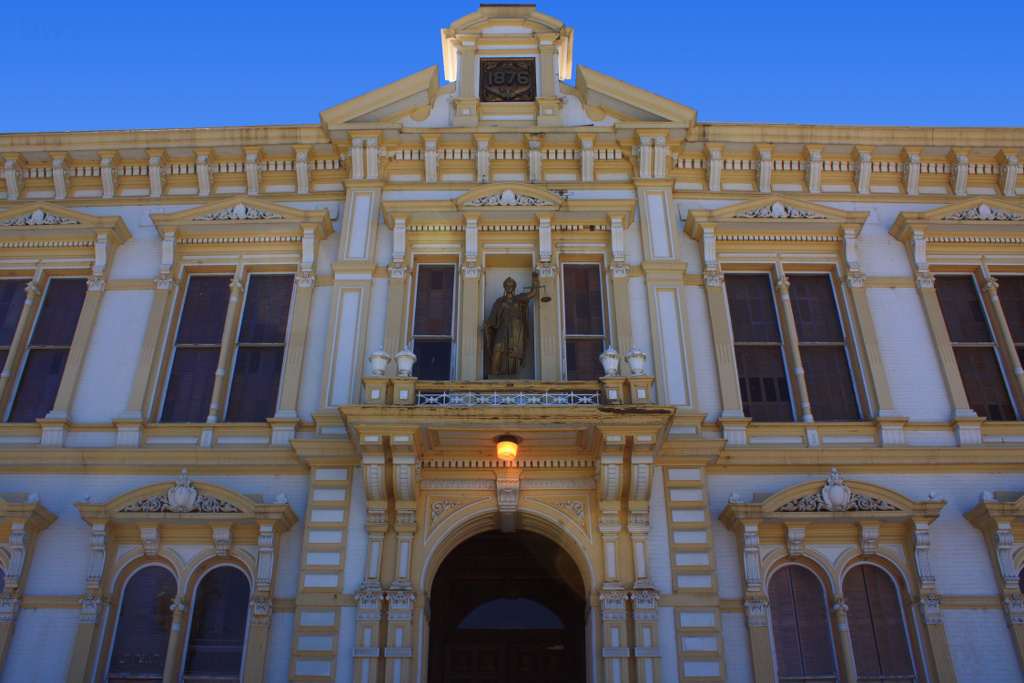
- Storey County Courthouse in Virginia City

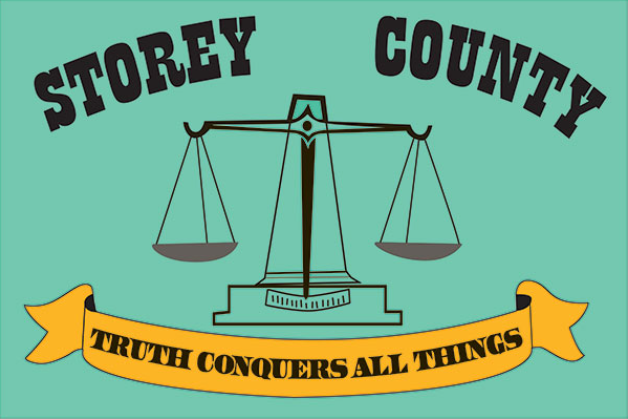
- Flag

- Location within the U.S. state of Nevada
- Coordinates: 39°27′N 119°32′W
- Country: United States
- State: Nevada
- Founded: 1861; 165 years ago
- Named for: Edward Farris Storey
- Seat: Virginia City
- Largest community: Virginia City

Area
  - Total: 264 sq mi (680 km^{2})
  - Land: 263 sq mi (680 km^{2})
  - Water: 0.7 sq mi (1.8 km^{2}) 0.3%

Population (2020)
  - Total: 4,104
  - Estimate (2025): 4,260 ▲
  - Density: 15.6/sq mi (6.02/km^{2})
- Time zone: UTC−8 (Pacific)
  - Summer (DST): UTC−7 (PDT)
- Congressional district: 2nd
- Website: storeycounty.org

Storey County is a county located in the U.S. state of Nevada. As of the 2020 census, the population was 4,104, making it the third-least populous county, but one of the fastest-growing economies in Nevada. In 2018, over 18,000 people were employed in the county. Its area is 264 square miles (680 square kilometers), making it the smallest county in Nevada in terms of area (though the independent city of Carson City is smaller). Its county seat is Virginia City. Storey County is part of the Reno-Sparks metropolitan area. The population of the county has fluctuated significantly throughout the years, from a high of 16,115 in 1880 to a low of 568 in 1960.

== History ==
Storey County was created in 1861 and named for Captain Edward Farris Storey, who was killed in 1860 in the Pyramid Lake War. It was the most populous county in Nevada when organized in 1861. Virginia City is the county seat. It was originally to be named McClellan County after General George B. McClellan, who later ran unsuccessfully against Abraham Lincoln for president in the 1864 election. Storey County benefited from the discovery of Comstock Lode silver.

W. Frank Stewart was a silver-mining operator who served from 1876 to 1880 as a state senator for Storey County.

The county population collapsed after the Comstock Lode was fully mined and hit a low of 568 in the 1960 census. Since then, its population has partially recovered because of its relative proximity to Reno.

== Geography ==
According to the U.S. Census Bureau, the county has a total area of 264 square miles (680 km^{2}), of which 263 square miles (680 km^{2}) are land and 0.7 sq mi (1.8 km^{2}) (0.3%) is covered by water.

=== Major highways ===
- Interstate 80
- State Route 341
- State Route 342
- State Route 439

=== Adjacent counties and city ===
- Washoe County – north
- Lyon County – southeast
- Carson City – southwest

== Demographics ==
Historical population
Census	Pop.	Note	%±
1870	11,359		—
1880	16,115		41.9%
1890	8,806		−45.4%
1900	3,673		−58.3%
1910	3,045		−17.1%
1920	1,469		−51.8%
1930	667		−54.6%
1940	1,216		82.3%
1950	671		−44.8%
1960	568		−15.4%
1970	695		22.4%
1980	1,503		116.3%
1990	2,526		68.1%
2000	3,399		34.6%
2010	4,010		18.0%
2020	4,104		2.3%
2025 (est.)	4,260	▲	3.8%
U.S. Decennial Census; 1790–1960 1900–1990; 1990–2000 2010–2020

=== Racial and ethnic composition ===
Storey County, Nevada – Racial and ethnic composition Note: the US Census treats Hispanic/Latino as an ethnic category. This table excludes Latinos from the racial categories and assigns them to a separate category. Hispanics/Latinos may be of any race.
Race / Ethnicity (NH = Non-Hispanic)	Pop 1980	Pop 1990	Pop 2000	Pop 2010	Pop 2020	% 1980	% 1990	% 2000	% 2010	% 2020
White alone (NH)	1,398	2,345	3,058	3,532	3,338	93.01%	92.83%	89.97%	88.08%	81.34%
Black or African American alone (NH)	5	8	9	40	24	0.33%	0.32%	0.26%	1.00%	0.58%
Native American or Alaska Native alone (NH)	37	45	44	57	38	2.46%	1.78%	1.29%	1.42%	0.93%
Asian alone (NH)	16	29	34	66	67	1.06%	1.15%	1.00%	1.65%	1.63%
Native Hawaiian or Pacific Islander alone (NH)	x	x	5	12	8	x	x	0.15%	0.30%	0.19%
Other race alone (NH)	4	3	5	2	34	0.27%	0.12%	0.15%	0.05%	0.83%
Mixed race or Multiracial (NH)	x	x	70	73	255	x	x	2.06%	1.82%	6.21%
Hispanic or Latino (any race)	43	96	174	228	340	2.86%	3.80%	5.12%	5.69%	8.28%
Total	1,503	2,526	3,399	4,010	4,104	100.00%	100.00%	100.00%	100.00%	100.00%

=== 2020 census ===
As of the 2020 census, the county had a population of 4,104; the median age was 54.2 years, 15.1% of residents were under the age of 18, and 29.4% were 65 years of age or older. For every 100 females there were 98.7 males, and for every 100 females age 18 and over there were 101.1 males age 18 and over. 10.9% of residents lived in urban areas while 89.1% lived in rural areas.

The racial makeup of the county was 83.5% White, 0.6% Black or African American, 1.1% American Indian and Alaska Native, 1.6% Asian, 0.3% Native Hawaiian and Pacific Islander, 3.0% from some other race, and 9.9% from two or more races. Hispanic or Latino residents of any race comprised 8.3% of the population.

There were 1,807 households in the county, of which 22.5% had children under the age of 18 living with them and 20.5% had a female householder with no spouse or partner present. About 26.6% of all households were made up of individuals and 14.1% had someone living alone who was 65 years of age or older.

There were 1,987 housing units, of which 9.1% were vacant. Among occupied housing units, 87.0% were owner-occupied and 13.0% were renter-occupied. The homeowner vacancy rate was 1.3% and the rental vacancy rate was 7.5%.

=== 2010 census ===
At the 2010 census, 4,010 people, 1,742 households, and 1,141 families were living in the county. The population density was 15.3 inhabitants per square mile (5.9/km^{2}). The 1,990 housing units averaged 7.6 units per square mile (2.9 units/km^{2}). The racial makeup of the county was 92.1% White, 1.6% Asian, 1.6% American Indian, 1.0% Black or African American, 0.4% Pacific Islander, 1.1% from other races, and 2.2% from two or more races. Those of Hispanic or Latino origin made up 5.7% of the population. In terms of ancestry, 20.9% were German, 20.1% were Irish, 11.5% were English, 7.2% were Italian, and 2.6% were American.

Of the 1,742 households, 23.1% had children under the age of 18 living with them, 53.6% were married couples living together, 7.6% had a female householder with no husband present, 34.5% were non-families, and 26.0% of households were made up of individuals. The average household size was 2.30 and the average family size was 2.76. The median age was 50.5 years.

The median household income was $61,525 and the median family income was $65,121. Males had a median income of $53,936 versus $34,208 for females. The per capita income for the county was $31,079. About 0.4% of families and 5.6% of the population were below the poverty line, including 2.6% of those under age 18 and 0.0% of those age 65 or over.

=== 2000 census ===
At the 2000 census, 3,399 people, 1,462 households, and 969 families were living in the county. The population density was 13 people per square mile (5.0 people/km^{2}). The 1,596 housing units averaged 6 units per square mile (2.3 units/km^{2}). The racial makeup of the county was 93.0% White, 0.3% Black or African American, 1.4% Native American, 1.0% Asian, 0.15% Pacific Islander, 1.7% from other races, and 2.4% from two or more races. About 5.1% of the population was Hispanic or Latino of any race.

Of the 1,462 households, 21.8% had children under the age of 18 living with them, 54.6% were married couples living together, 7.5% had a female householder with no husband present, and 33.7% were non-families. 25.6% of households were one person and 6.9% were one person aged 65 or older. The average household size was 2.32, and the average family size was 2.74.

In the county, the population was distributed as 19.7% under the age of 18, 4.7% from 18 to 24, 26.8% from 25 to 44, 35.7% from 45 to 64, and 13.1% 65 or older. The median age was 44 years. For every 100 females, there were 107.6 males. For every 100 females age 18 and over, there were 103.1 males.

The median income for a household was $45,490 and for a family was $57,095. Males had a median income of $40,123 versus $26,417 for females. The per capita income for the county was $23,642; 5.8% of the population and 2.5% of families were below the poverty line. Out of the total people living in poverty, 4.2% were under the age of 18 and 4.8% were 65 or older.

== Communities ==
No incorporated communities are in Storey County.

- Clark
- Gold Hill
- Lockwood
- Virginia City (county seat; a census-designated place)
- Virginia City Highlands

== Economy ==
Technology, manufacturing and logistics are the main sectors. In 2010, manufacturing jobs were less than 500, increasing to over 11,000 by 2019, many of them making battery storage. Logistics jobs increased from 1,300 to 4,000 in the same period. In 2014, 5,000 people were working in the county, increasing to over 18,000 by 2018, mostly in the Tahoe Reno Industrial Center. The Tesla Gigafactory 1 had been constructed there.

Storey County has legal prostitution, which provided a significant portion of the tax base. The county is also trying to lure high-technology businesses.

In May 2018, U.S. Treasury Secretary Steven Mnuchin had instructed his staff to accept a tract in the county as an opportunity zone under the Tax Cuts and Jobs Act of 2017, though it had not qualified as low-income. Michael Milken, who had attended multiple events with and given a private flight to Mnuchin leading up to the designation, was already an investor in the tract.

== Politics ==
Storey County leans towards the Republican Party, with it voting for every Republican since 1980, with the exception being in 1992, when it voted for Independent Ross Perot. It was the only county in the state to do so.

United States presidential election results for Storey County, Nevada
Year	Republican		Democratic		Third party(ies)	
Year	No.	%	No.	%	No.	%
1904	627	61.47%	322	31.57%	71	6.96%
1908	447	48.85%	402	43.93%	66	7.21%
1912	166	19.30%	400	46.51%	294	34.19%
1916	403	45.80%	463	52.61%	14	1.59%
1920	324	52.51%	272	44.08%	21	3.40%
1924	283	37.19%	209	27.46%	269	35.35%
1928	185	40.57%	271	59.43%	0	0.00%
1932	124	33.42%	247	66.58%	0	0.00%
1936	139	26.18%	392	73.82%	0	0.00%
1940	224	36.96%	382	63.04%	0	0.00%
1944	163	48.51%	173	51.49%	0	0.00%
1948	187	48.20%	184	47.42%	17	4.38%
1952	206	58.03%	149	41.97%	0	0.00%
1956	226	60.11%	150	39.89%	0	0.00%
1960	203	54.86%	167	45.14%	0	0.00%
1964	172	39.72%	261	60.28%	0	0.00%
1968	222	50.00%	172	38.74%	50	11.26%
1972	508	69.21%	226	30.79%	0	0.00%
1976	274	43.08%	310	48.74%	52	8.18%
1980	460	58.75%	222	28.35%	101	12.90%
1984	570	66.74%	252	29.51%	32	3.75%
1988	651	56.36%	432	37.40%	72	6.23%
1992	458	30.15%	488	32.13%	573	37.72%
1996	705	42.60%	614	37.10%	336	20.30%
2000	1,014	56.40%	666	37.04%	118	6.56%
2004	1,253	57.80%	871	40.18%	44	2.03%
2008	1,247	51.57%	1,102	45.57%	69	2.85%
2012	1,321	57.09%	920	39.76%	73	3.15%
2016	1,616	63.17%	752	29.40%	190	7.43%
2020	1,908	66.32%	902	31.35%	67	2.33%
2024	2,108	68.55%	913	29.69%	54	1.76%

United States Senate election results for Storey County, Nevada1
Year	Republican		Democratic		Third party(ies)	
Year	No.	%	No.	%	No.	%
2024	1,964	64.22%	919	30.05%	175	5.72%

== See also ==
- National Register of Historic Places listings in Storey County, Nevada
- Republic of Molossia – a micronation in southern Storey County
- List of Nevada brothels – Storey County
