= Clark, Nevada =

Unincorporated community in Storey County, Nevada, United States

- Unincorporated community
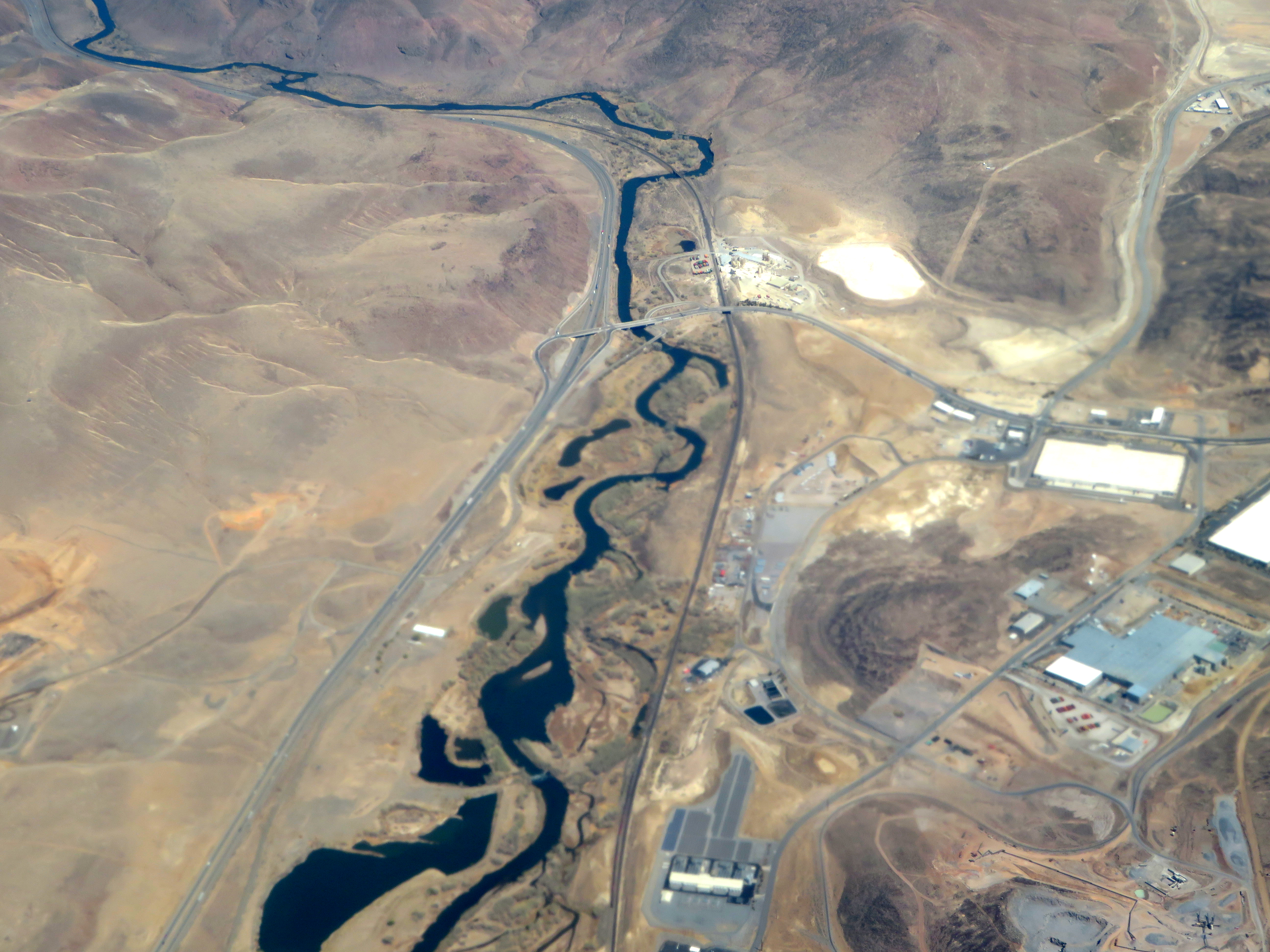
- Aerial photograph of Clark, April 2021

- Location within Nevada Location within the United States
- Coordinates: 39°33′51″N 119°28′54″W
- Country: United States
- State: Nevada
- County: Storey, Washoe
- Named for: James Clark
- Elevation: 4,259 ft (1,298 m)
- Time zone: UTC-8 (Pacific (PST))
  - Summer (DST): UTC-7 (PDT)
- ZIP code: 89437
- Area code: 775
- GNIS feature ID: 0854901

Clark is an unincorporated community on the Truckee River in Storey and Washoe counties in Nevada, United States, about 17 miles (27 km) east of Reno and Sparks.

== Description ==
Clark has also been known as Clark Siding, Clark Station, Clarks, and Clarks Siding.

Clark can be accessed from the north via Interstate 80 on the Nevada State Route 439 (USA Parkway) exit, and from the west via roads from nearby Lockwood.

Tesla's Gigafactory 1, which produces batteries, is located nearby.

== History ==
In around 1862, James Clark, boss of Chinese laborers on the Central Pacific Railroad, settled in the area. Clark raised potatoes and hay for Virginia City. The post office was called Clarks from April 1890 until March 1894. The post office was called Clark from November 1906 to March 1907 and July 1912 to July 1919.
