= Nevada State Route 439 =

State highway in Nevada, United States

State Route 439
- USA Parkway
- SR 439 highlighted in red

Route information
- Maintained by NDOT
- Length: 19.104 mi (30.745 km)
- Existed: 2015–present
- History: Extended south in 2017
- NHS: Entire length

Major junctions
- South end: US 50 in Silver Springs
- North end: I-80 in Clark

Location
- Country: United States
- State: Nevada
- Counties: Lyon, Storey, Washoe,

Highway system
- Nevada State Highway System; Interstate; US; State; Pre‑1976; Scenic
← SR 431	→ SR 43

State Route 439 (SR 439) is a four-lane state highway in Lyon, Storey, and Washoe counties in the US state of Nevada. Better known as USA Parkway, the route connects U.S. Route 50 (US 50) in Silver Springs with Interstate 80 (I-80) in Clark via the Tahoe Reno Industrial Center (TRIC). The northern portion of USA Parkway was initially constructed by the industrial center's developers; however, the Nevada Department of Transportation (NDOT) agreed to assume control of the road after Tesla announced plans to build its Gigafactory at TRIC in 2014. NDOT opened the extension of SR 439 south to US 50 in Lyon County on September 8, 2017.

== Route description ==
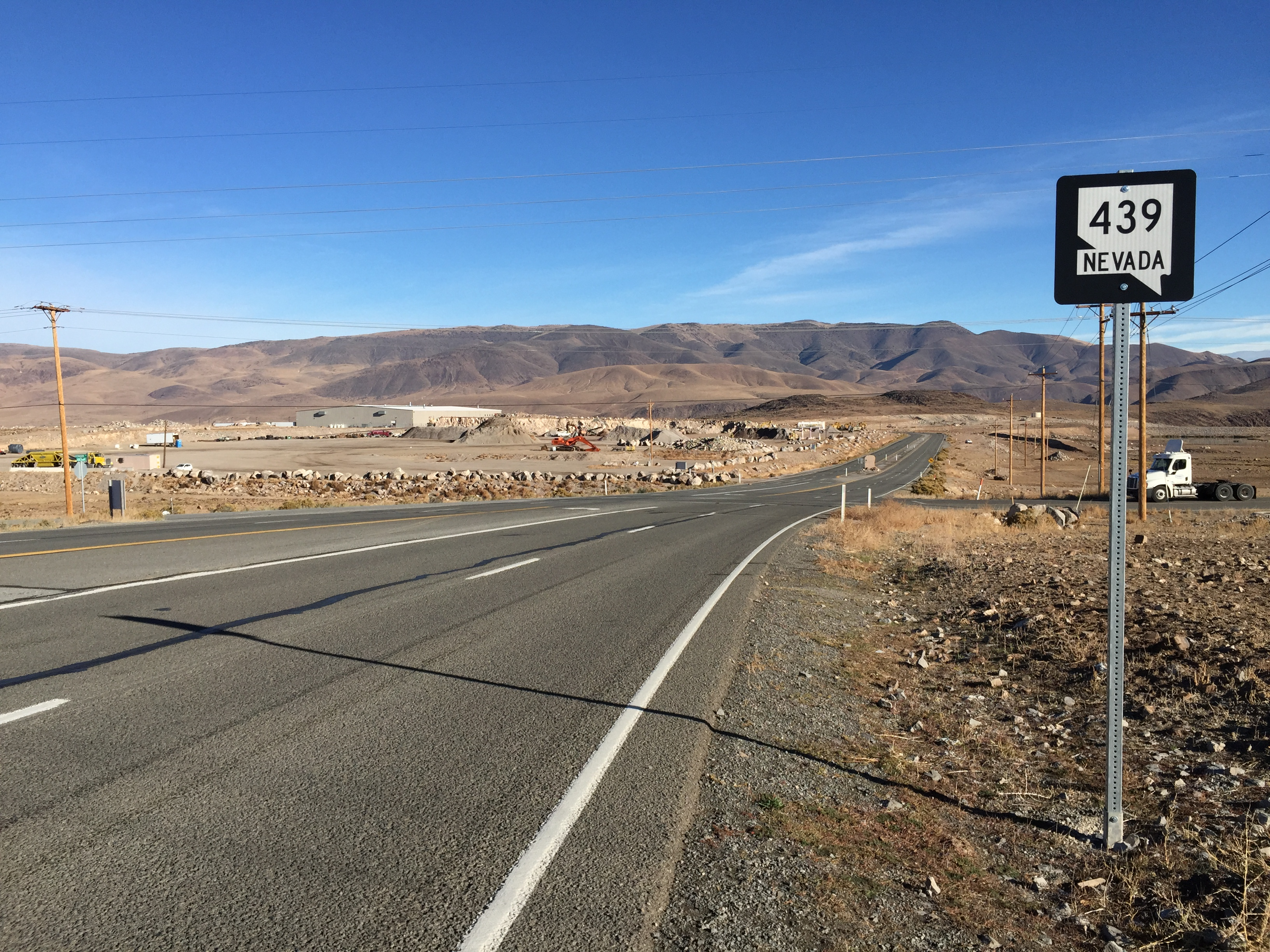
North on Nevada State Route 439 (USA Parkway) in Storey County, October 2015

SR 439 serves as a four-lane highway connector between US 50 and I-80. The southern end of the highway is at a roundabout with US 50 in the city of Silver Springs, near Silver Springs Airport in Lyon County. From there, the road heads northwest into mountainous terrain, providing access to the Tahoe Reno Industrial Center and the Tesla Gigafactory in Storey County. The highway continues northerly to the unincorporated community of Clark, where is crosses the Truckee River (entering Washoe County) and immediately ends at a modified diamond interchange with I-80, approximately 17 miles (27 km) east of Sparks.

== History ==
The owners of the Tahoe Reno Industrial Center constructed the six-mile (9.7 km) USA Parkway between I-80 and TRIC for $60 million in 2001 specifically to provide access to TRIC (touted as the largest industrial park in the United States) in Storey County.

In August 2009, it was reported that 10 miles (16 km) of roadway had been completed—the southernmost four miles (6.4 km) to the Lyon County line had only been graded and were still awaiting pavement—while roughly seven miles (11 km) of the route to reach US 50 remained unconstructed.

=== Expansion plans ===
As the plans for TRIC were realized with many large companies moving in, greater plans were made for USA Parkway. As early as 2004, the road was proposed to connect with US 50 near Silver Springs, for a total distance between I-80 and US 50 of about 18 miles (29 km). The connection to Silver Springs would increase regional mobility and provide air-freight shipping possibilities at nearby Silver Springs Airport. Proponents of the USA Parkway southern expansion proposed the idea of having USA Parkway accepted into Nevada's state highway system as State Route 805, but NDOT did not take such action.

In 2012 and early 2013, the road network was found to fall short of TRIC's future needs. Expansion for 2017 was calculated to have a network-wide benefit–cost ratio of 9.1 (with 30-year benefits of $600 million for costs of $66 million), and a travel reduction time of 38%, as the increased traffic could use the shorter SR 439 for TRIC and avoid the congestion around Reno.

=== Expansion project ===
Tesla announced plans to locate its Gigafactory battery production facility at TRIC in September 2014. By 2015, NDOT had officially recognized the northernmost 6.259 miles (10.073 km) of USA Parkway as SR 439. Inadequate traffic management on SR 439 sometimes caused traffic to back up out on the freeway and the Walmart trucks struggle to operate on time. At the end points of the future SR 439, the combined traffic of I-80 and US 50 was around 30,000 vehicles per day in 2015. The interchange between I-80 and SR 439 had a low level of service since 2016, causing congestion. The Regional Transportation Commission of Washoe County views the improvements as insufficient for the expected area development.

To support the projected travel demand of 6,000 vehicles per day, the NDOT Board of Directors approved a design–build project to complete the southern extension of USA Parkway in an expedited manner, two years earlier than projected. The project, which involved NDOT taking over USA Parkway for $43 million and upgrading it to highway standards, was planned for completion in December 2017 and was expected to cost between $65 million and $70 million. The funds to fast-track the USA Parkway build-out were obtained by deferring maintenance projects on seven low-priority northern Nevada highways. The contract price was $75.9 million. Eighty workers were on site 24/6 building the road in stages, with paving started in October 2016. A two-lane roundabout was built at US 50. The I-80 ramps were also improved due to heavy traffic.

At a ribbon cutting ceremony held on August 28, 2017, in anticipation of the completion of construction, Governor Brian Sandoval bestowed the honorary name of "Infinity Highway" upon USA Parkway. The extension opened for access on September 8, 2017, on budget and three months ahead of schedule.

== Major intersections ==
County	Location	mi	km	Destinations	Notes
Lyon	Silver Springs	0.000	0.000	US 50 (Lincoln Highway) – Fallon, Carson City; Opal Avenue south	Southern terminus; roadway continues southward as Opal Avenue
Storey	No major junctions				
Washoe		19.104	30.745	I-80 (Dwight D. Eisenhower Highway) – Reno, Fernley	Northern terminus; I-80 exit 32
1.000 mi = 1.609 km; 1.000 km = 0.621 mi
