= Swing state =

US state where no party for election has overwhelming support

Summary of statewide results of the 2012, 2016, 2020, and 2024 presidential elections by state Won by the Republicans in all four elections Won by the Republicans in three of the four elections Won by each party twice in the four elections Won by the Democrats in three of the four elections Won by the Democrats in all four elections

Map of 2020–2024 Cook PVI for all voting entities in the 2028 United States presidential election (states, federal district, and congressional districts of Maine and Nebraska) Map legend: State or district has a Cook PVI of D+10 or greater State or district has a Cook PVI between D+5 and D+10 State or district has a Cook PVI between D+2 and D+5 State or district has a Cook PVI between EVEN and D+2 State or district has a Cook PVI between EVEN and R+2 State or district has a Cook PVI between R+2 and R+5 State or district has a Cook PVI between R+5 and R+10 State or district has a Cook PVI of R+10 or greater

In United States politics, a swing state (also known as a battleground state, a toss-up state, or a purple state) is any state that could reasonably be won by either the Democratic or Republican candidate in a statewide election, most often referring to presidential elections, by a swing in votes. These swing states or states battleground are usually targeted by both major-party campaigns, especially in competitive elections such as ‘Clinton vs. Trump’ election. Meanwhile, the states that regularly lean to a single party are known as "safe states" (or more specifically as "red states" and "blue states" depending on the partisan leaning), as it is generally assumed that one candidate has a base of support from which a sufficient share of the electorate can be drawn without significant investment or effort by the campaign. In the 2024 United States presidential election, seven states were widely considered to be the crucial swing states: Arizona, Georgia, Michigan, Nevada, North Carolina, Pennsylvania, and Wisconsin.

Due to the winner-take-all method that most states use to determine their presidential electors, candidates often campaign only in competitive states, which is why a select group of states frequently receives a majority of the advertisements and candidate visits. The battlegrounds may change in certain election cycles and may be reflected in overall polling, demographics, and the ideological appeal of the candidates.

== Background ==
Map of states by partisan lean in the 2024 United States presidential election, weighted relative to the national popular vote margin (1.5% in favor of the Republican nominee, Donald Trump, over the Democratic nominee, Kamala Harris) Legend (darker indicates greater margin): Relative lean of >10 points toward Harris Relative lean of 5–10 points toward Harris Relative lean of <5 points toward Harris Relative lean of <5 points toward Trump Relative lean of 5–10 points toward Trump Relative lean of >10 points toward Trump

In United States presidential elections, each state has the liberty to decide the method by which its electors to the Electoral College will be chosen. To increase its voting power in the Electoral College system, every state, with the exceptions of Maine and Nebraska, has adopted a winner-take-all system, where the candidate who wins the most popular votes in a state wins all of that state's electoral votes.

Theoretically, candidates would focus on winning the states with the most electoral votes, as winning these states would be the easiest way to achieve an electoral majority. However, due to political polarization, most states are considered either completely Democratic or reliably Republican, making heavily campaigning in these states unproductive for candidates as the outcomes are generally predictable. Thus, in practice, presidential candidates concentrate their limited time and resources campaigning in states that they believe they can swing towards them or stop states from swinging away from them.

Because of the electoral system, the campaigns are less concerned with increasing a candidate's national popular vote, tending instead to concentrate on the popular vote only in those states which will provide the electoral votes it needs to win the election, as many successful candidates have lost the popular vote but won the electoral college.

In past electoral results, Republican candidates would have expected to easily win most of the mountain states and Great Plains, such as Idaho, Wyoming, the Dakotas, Montana, Utah, Kansas, Oklahoma, and Nebraska, most of the South, including Alabama, Mississippi, Louisiana, Arkansas, Tennessee, Kentucky, South Carolina, Missouri, Texas, and West Virginia, as well as Alaska. Democrats usually take the Mid-Atlantic states, including New York, New Jersey, Maryland, Virginia, and Delaware, New England, particularly Vermont, Massachusetts, Rhode Island, and Connecticut, the West Coast states of California, Oregon, Washington, Hawaii, and the Southwestern states of Colorado and New Mexico, as well as the Great Lakes states of Illinois and Minnesota.

However, some states that consistently vote for one party at the presidential level occasionally elect a governor of the opposite party; this is currently the case in New Hampshire and Vermont which have Republican governors, as well as in Kentucky and Kansas, which currently have Democratic governors. Even in presidential election years, voters may split presidential and gubernatorial tickets. In 2024, this occurred in three states: North Carolina, Vermont and New Hampshire. Vermont and New Hampshire both elected Republican governors even as Democrat Kamala Harris won both states. North Carolina, despite voting for Republican Donald Trump, elected a Democratic governor. North Carolina has elected a Democratic governor in each concurrent gubernatorial election where Donald Trump was the Republican presidential nominee, by a notably wide margin in 2024.

In Maine and Nebraska, the apportionment of electoral votes parallels that for U.S. senators and representatives. Two electoral votes go to the candidate who wins the plurality of the vote statewide, and a candidate gets an additional electoral vote for each congressional district in which they receive a plurality. Both of these states have relatively few electoral votes – a total of 4 and 5, respectively. Nebraska has split its votes since 1992, and Maine has done so since 1972. Each state has split its electoral votes only thrice since implementation: all three times Maine's second district gave one vote to Donald Trump, in 2016 (won), 2020 (lost) and 2024 (won); while Obama in 2008 (won), Biden in 2020 (won), and Harris in 2024 (lost) obtained the Nebraska's second district vote in their respective races.

== Competitive states ==
States where the election has a close result become less meaningful in landslide elections. Instead, states which vote similarly to the national vote proportions are more likely to appear as the closest states. For example, the states in the 1984 election with the tightest results were Minnesota and Massachusetts. A campaign strategy centered on them, however, would not have been meaningful in the Electoral College, as Democratic nominee Walter Mondale required victories in many more states than Massachusetts, and Republican Ronald Reagan still would have won by a large margin. Instead, the tipping-point state that year was Michigan, as it gave Reagan the decisive electoral vote. The difference in Michigan was nineteen percentage points, quite similar to Reagan's national margin of eighteen percent. Michigan would have been more relevant to the election results had the election been closer.

Similarly, Barack Obama's narrow victory in Indiana in the 2008 election inaccurately portrays its status as a battleground. Obama lost Indiana by more than ten percentage points in the closer 2012 election, but triumphed anyway as Indiana's electoral votes were not directly needed for a coalition of 270 votes; the same scenario was with Missouri, where John McCain narrowly won by 4,000 votes in the 2008 election, but was won by Mitt Romney by nearly 10 points in 2012 election, indicating its GOP trend. Other lightly Republican leaning states such as North Carolina and Arizona were more plausible Democratic pick-ups in 2012.

In 2012, the states of North Carolina, Florida, Ohio, and Virginia were decided by a margin of less than five percent. However, none of them were considered the tipping-point state, as Romney would not have been able to defeat Obama even if he had emerged victorious in all of them. Virginia was most in-step with the rest of the country. Virginians voted for Obama by just under 4 points, almost the exact same as the nation. Had the election come out closer, Romney's path to victory would probably have involved also winning Wisconsin, Nevada, New Hampshire, or Iowa, as these states had comparable margins to Colorado, and had been battlegrounds during the election.

As many mathematical analysts have noted, however, the state voting in a fashion most similar to that of the nation as a whole is not necessarily the tipping-point. For example, if a candidate wins only a few states but does so by a wide margin, while the other candidate's victories are much closer, the popular vote would likely favor the former. However, although the vast majority of the states leaned to the latter candidate in comparison to the entire country, many of them would end up having voted for the loser in greater numbers than did the tipping-point state. The presidential election in 2016 was a notable example, as it featured one of the largest historical disparities between the Electoral College and popular vote.

Additionally, this "split" in votes was much larger in both directions than in previous elections, such as the 2000 election. In that election, Vice President Al Gore won the popular vote by less than 1 percent, while incoming president George W. Bush won the Electoral College by only 5 votes. In contrast, 2016 Democratic nominee Hillary Clinton won the popular vote by over 2 percentage points. This meant that Donald Trump would have picked up New Hampshire, Nevada, and Minnesota if the popular vote had been tied, assuming a uniform shift among the battleground states. On the other hand, Clinton would have had to win the popular vote by at least 3 points to win the Electoral College, as Trump, the Republican nominee, won the tipping-point state of Wisconsin by less than 1 percent.

In 2020, Joe Biden won the popular vote by over 4 percentage points but won the tipping point state of Pennsylvania by only 1 percent. This shows Donald Trump could win the election even if he lost the popular vote by over 3 percent and would have picked up Georgia, Arizona, and Wisconsin with a uniform shift among the states.

In 2024, Donald Trump won the popular vote by a narrow margin of 1.5%, while winning the tipping point state of Pennsylvania by a similarly narrow margin of 1.7% percent. This is evidence of an erosion of the popular vote advantage that Democratic candidates have typically enjoyed in recent elections, likely spurred by a significant narrowing of margins in safe blue states such as California, New York, New Jersey, and Illinois, which each saw dramatic shifts toward the Republican candidate, as well as dramatic increases in the Republican support in moderately red states such as Florida and Texas compared to previous cycles.

Swing states have generally changed over time. For instance, the swing states of Ohio, Connecticut, Indiana, New Jersey, and New York were key to the outcome of the 1888 election. Likewise, Illinois and Texas were key to the outcome of the 1960 election, Florida and New Hampshire were key in deciding the 2000 election, and Ohio was important during the 2004 election. Ohio has gained its reputation as a regular swing state after 1980, and did not vote against the winner between 1960 and 2020. In the 2024 election, Ohio and Florida had shifted rightward and were considered safe wins for Republicans.

In fact, only three people have won the presidential election without winning Ohio since 1900: Franklin D. Roosevelt, John F. Kennedy, and Joe Biden. Areas considered battlegrounds in the 2020 election were Arizona, Florida, Georgia, Iowa, Maine's 2nd congressional district, Michigan, Minnesota, Nebraska's 2nd congressional district, Nevada, New Hampshire, North Carolina, Ohio, Pennsylvania, Texas and Wisconsin, with Florida, Michigan, Ohio, Pennsylvania, and Wisconsin constituting the "Big Five" most likely to decide the Electoral College. In the end, Joe Biden won Arizona, Georgia, Michigan, Minnesota, NE-02, Nevada, New Hampshire, Pennsylvania, and Wisconsin, while Donald Trump won ME-02, Florida, Iowa, North Carolina, Ohio, and Texas.

Campaign strategies are not universal in swing states. Statistical analytics website FiveThirtyEight notes that some swing states, such as New Hampshire, swing because they have many moderate, independent swing voters, and campaigning puts an emphasis on persuading voters. Contrasting this is Georgia, which is a swing state because it has large populations of Republican-leaning evangelical whites and Democratic-leaning Black voters and urban college-educated professionals, thus campaigns often concentrate on voter turnout.

== Determining swing states ==
Presidential campaigns and pundits seek to keep track of the shifting electoral landscape. While swing states in past elections can be determined simply by looking at how close the vote was in each state, determining states likely to be swing states in future elections requires estimation and projection based on previous election results, opinion polling, political trends, recent developments since the previous election, and any strengths or weaknesses of the particular candidate involved. The swing-state "map" transforms between each election cycle, depending on the candidates and their policies, sometimes dramatically and sometimes subtly.

For example, in the 2016 election, Hillary Clinton overperformed in educated, suburban states such as Colorado and Virginia compared to past Democratic candidates, while Donald Trump performed above standard Republican expectations in the Rust Belt, such as Michigan, Ohio, Pennsylvania, and Wisconsin. In addition, gradual shifts can occur within states due to changes in demography, geography, or population patterns. For example, many currently Republican states, like Arkansas, Missouri, Tennessee, and West Virginia, had been battlegrounds as recently as 2004.

According to a pre-election 2016 analysis, the thirteen most competitive states were Wisconsin, Pennsylvania, New Hampshire, Minnesota, Arizona, Georgia, Virginia, Florida, Michigan, Nevada, Colorado, North Carolina, and Maine. Nebraska's 2nd congressional district was (and is still as of 2024) also considered competitive. However, this projection was not specific to any particular election cycle, and assumed similar levels of support for both parties.

Ten weeks before the 2020 presidential election, statistical analytics website FiveThirtyEight noted that the electoral map is "undergoing a series of changes", with some states moving rightward, other states moving leftward, and two states (Florida, until the 2020 election, and North Carolina) described as "perennial" swing states. Likewise, an analysis of results of the 2018 midterms indicated that the "battleground states" are changing, with Colorado and Ohio becoming less competitive and more Democratic and Republican, respectively, while Georgia and Arizona were slowly turning into swing states.

== Criticism ==
The Electoral College encourages political campaigners to focus most of their efforts on courting voters in swing states. States in which polling shows no clear favorite are usually targeted at a higher rate with campaign visits, television advertising, and get out the vote efforts by party organizers and debates. According to Katrina Vanden Heuvel, a journalist for The Nation, "four out of five" voters in the national election are "absolutely ignored".

Since most states use a winner-takes-all arrangement, in which the candidate with the most votes in that state receives all of the state's electoral votes, there is a clear incentive to focus almost exclusively on only a few undecided states. In contrast, many states with large populations such as California, Texas and New York have in recent elections been considered "safe" for a particular party, and therefore not a priority for campaign visits and money. Meanwhile, twelve of the thirteen smallest states are thought of as safe for either party – only New Hampshire is regularly a swing state. Additionally, campaigns stopped mounting nationwide electoral efforts in the last few months near/at the ends of the blowout 2008 election, but rather targeted only a handful of battlegrounds.

== Swing states by results ==
This is a chart of the ten closest states in recent elections, ranked by margin of victory. For example, the table shows a large number of blue states in 2012 because many states went blue by a relatively small margin in 2012, while almost no states went red by a small margin.

The tipping-point state is bolded. The "bias" is the difference between the tipping point state's margin and the popular vote's margin. (In 2008, the tipping point state was Colorado with an 8.97%D margin, placing it outside the chart as the 12th closest state.)

Swing states and tipping point states in presidential elections, 2000–2024
| 2024 election | Margin | 2020 election | Margin | 2016 election | Margin | 2012 election | Margin | 2008 election | Margin | 2004 election | Margin | 2000 election | Margin |
|---|---|---|---|---|---|---|---|---|---|---|---|---|---|
| Virginia | 5.78%D | Minnesota | 7.11%D | Maine | 2.96%D | Wisconsin | 6.94%D | Virginia | 6.30%D | Oregon | 4.16%D | Minnesota | 2.40%D |
| Minnesota | 4.24%D | Michigan | 2.78%D | Nevada | 2.42%D | Nevada | 6.68%D | Ohio | 4.59%D | Minnesota | 3.48%D | Oregon | 0.44%D |
| New Hampshire | 2.78%D | Nevada | 2.39%D | Minnesota | 1.52%D | Iowa | 5.81%D | Florida | 2.81%D | Michigan | 3.42%R | Iowa | 0.31%D |
| Wisconsin | 0.87%R | Pennsylvania | 1.16%D | New Hampshire | 0.37%D | New Hampshire | 5.58%D | Indiana | 1.04%D | Pennsylvania | 2.50%D | Wisconsin | 0.22%D |
| Michigan | 1.41%R | **Wisconsin** (Note: Presuming that a 269–269 electoral tie would have broken in favor of Trump (see contingent election), otherwise Pennsylvania would have been the tipping-point state) | 0.63%D | Michigan | 0.23%R | Pennsylvania | 5.38%D | North Carolina | 0.32%D | New Hampshire | 1.37%D | New Mexico | 0.06%R |
| **Pennsylvania** | 1.71%R | Arizona | 0.31%D | **Pennsylvania** (Note: Pennsylvania when counting faithless electors, Wisconsin if ignoring faithless electors) | 0.72%R | **Colorado** | 5.36%D | Missouri | 0.14%R | Wisconsin | 0.38%D | **Florida** | <0.01%R |
| Georgia | 2.20%R | Georgia | 0.24%D | Wisconsin | 0.77%R | Virginia | 3.88%D | Montana | 2.26%R | Iowa | 0.67%R | New Hampshire | 1.27%R |
| Nevada | 3.10%R | North Carolina | 1.35%R | Florida | 1.20%R | Ohio | 2.98%D | Georgia | 5.21%R | New Mexico | 0.79%R | Missouri | 3.34%R |
| North Carolina | 3.21%R | Florida | 3.36%R | Arizona | 3.55%R | Florida | 0.88%D | South Dakota | 8.41%R | **Ohio** | 2.10%R | Ohio | 3.51%R |
| Arizona | 5.53%R | Texas | 5.58%R | North Carolina | 3.66%R | North Carolina | 2.04%R | Arizona | 8.52%R | Nevada | 2.59%R | Nevada | 3.55%R |
| National | 1.48%R | National | 4.45%D | National | 2.10%D | National | 3.86%D | National | 7.27%D | National | 2.46%R | National | 0.52%D |
| Bias | 0.23%R | Bias | 3.82%R | Bias | 2.87%R | Bias | 1.51%D | Bias | 1.68%D | Bias | 0.35%D | Bias | 0.53%R |

== See also ==
- Bellwether
- Blue wall (United States)
- Lingayen–Lucena corridor
- Marginal seat
- Missouri bellwether
- Purple America
- Red states and blue states
- Global swing state
- Triangulation (politics)
