= 1968 United States presidential election in Nevada =

- November 5, 1968

Nominee	Richard Nixon	Hubert Humphrey	George Wallace
Party	Republican	Democratic	American Independent
Home state	New York (Note: Although he was born in California and he served as a U.S. senator from California, in 1968 Richard Nixon's official state of residence was New York, because he moved there to practice law after his defeat in the 1962 California gubernatorial election. During his first term as president, Nixon re-established his residency in California. Consequently, most reliable reference books list Nixon's home state as New York in the 1968 election and his home state as California in the 1972 (and 1960) election.)	Minnesota	Alabama
Running mate	Spiro Agnew	Edmund Muskie	S. Marvin Griffin
Electoral vote	3	0	0
Popular vote	73,188	60,598	20,432
Percentage	47.46%	39.29%	13.25%
County results
Nixon
30–40%
40–50%
50–60%
60–70%
Humphrey
40–50%
50–60%
President before election
Lyndon B. Johnson
Democratic
Elected President
Richard Nixon
Republican

The 1968 United States presidential election in Nevada took place on November 5, 1968, as part of the 1968 United States presidential election. State voters chose three representatives, or electors, to the Electoral College, who voted for president and vice president.

Since William Jennings Bryan's three elections, Nevada had been a bellwether state voting for every winner since 1912. However, relative to the nation, Nevada had trended Republican since the end of World War II when Populist radicalism gave way to small-town and rural conservatism due to demographic and technological change. Although Democrats had a large advantage in registration, the 1966 midterm elections saw Republican Lieutenant Governor Paul Laxalt take most of the Mormon and Catholic vote in traditionally Democratic Clark County, which was becoming the center of the state's rapid demographic growth. This Republican trend was aided by a fall in demand for construction work in Las Vegas and several major strikes across the state.

In the early stages of the campaign, the Democratic Party viewed Nixon – despite losing strongly Catholic Nevada to Kennedy in 1960 – as much more dangerous in Nevada than Ronald Reagan or George Romney. As a part of his national third party segregationist campaign, former Alabama Governor George Wallace became the first third-party candidate to obtain the necessary eight thousand signatures to get on the ballot in Nevada since the "Progressive Party" in 1948.

In the earliest polls Nevada's past Republican trend was confirmed, with it being given clearly to Nixon in the second week of September, and confirmed by further polls until the last few days before the election. During this period Humphrey made a brief visit to Nevada and came back substantially nationwide, whilst a strong poll for Wallace made the state doubtful.

Ultimately former Vice President Richard Nixon, with 47.46% of the popular vote, won Nevada more substantially than predicted by the last polls, though by less than thought likely in September and early October. "Independent American" candidate George Wallace finished with 13.25% of the popular vote, close to his national average but his best performance outside the Confederacy and Border States. Wallace's success was largely due to his endorsement by state congressman Walter S. Baring Jr., a conservative "States' Rights Democrat" who consistently managed huge majorities in Nevada's rural 'Cow Counties' (the 14 counties apart from Clark, Washoe, and Carson City).

Nixon's victory was the first of six consecutive Republican victories in the state, as Nevada wouldn't vote Democratic again until Bill Clinton in 1992.

== Results ==
1968 United States presidential election in Nevada
Party	Candidate	Votes	%
Republican	Richard Nixon	73,188	47.46%
Democratic	Hubert Humphrey	60,598	39.29%
American Independent	George Wallace	20,432	13.25%
Total votes		154,218	100%

=== Results by county ===
County	Richard Nixon Republican		Hubert Humphrey Democratic		George Wallace American Independent		Margin		Total votes cast
County	#	%	#	%	#	%	#	%	Total votes cast
Churchill	1,954	52.25%	1,211	32.38%	575	15.37%	743	19.87%	3,740
Clark	31,522	41.99%	33,225	44.26%	10,318	13.75%	-1,703	-2.27%	75,065
Douglas	1,801	64.37%	670	23.95%	327	11.69%	1,131	40.42%	2,798
Elko	2,687	54.48%	1,686	34.18%	559	11.33%	1,001	20.30%	4,932
Esmeralda	138	39.09%	118	33.43%	97	27.48%	20	5.66%	353
Eureka	277	56.53%	149	30.41%	64	13.06%	128	26.12%	490
Humboldt	1,287	50.97%	885	35.05%	353	13.98%	402	15.92%	2,525
Lander	461	50.72%	301	33.11%	147	16.17%	160	17.61%	909
Lincoln	555	49.87%	414	37.20%	144	12.94%	141	12.67%	1,113
Lyon	1,616	53.88%	939	31.31%	444	14.80%	677	22.57%	2,999
Mineral	927	32.31%	1,242	43.29%	700	24.40%	-315	-10.98%	2,869
Nye	843	40.70%	728	35.15%	500	24.14%	115	5.55%	2,071
Ormsby	3,169	56.58%	1,770	31.60%	662	11.82%	1,399	24.98%	5,601
Pershing	567	46.74%	466	38.42%	180	14.84%	101	8.32%	1,213
Storey	222	50.00%	172	38.74%	50	11.26%	50	11.26%	444
Washoe	23,492	54.65%	14,560	33.87%	4,936	11.48%	8,932	20.78%	42,988
White Pine	1,670	40.65%	2,062	50.19%	376	9.15%	-392	-9.54%	4,108
Totals	73,188	47.46%	60,598	39.29%	20,432	13.25%	12,590	8.17%	154,218

==== Counties that flipped from Democratic to Republican ====
- Ormsby
- Elko
- Esmeralda
- Eureka
- Humboldt
- Lander
- Lincoln
- Nye
- Pershing
- Storey
- Washoe

== See also ==
- United States presidential elections in Nevada
