= Lockwood, Nevada =

Unincorporated community in Nevada, US

- Unincorporated community
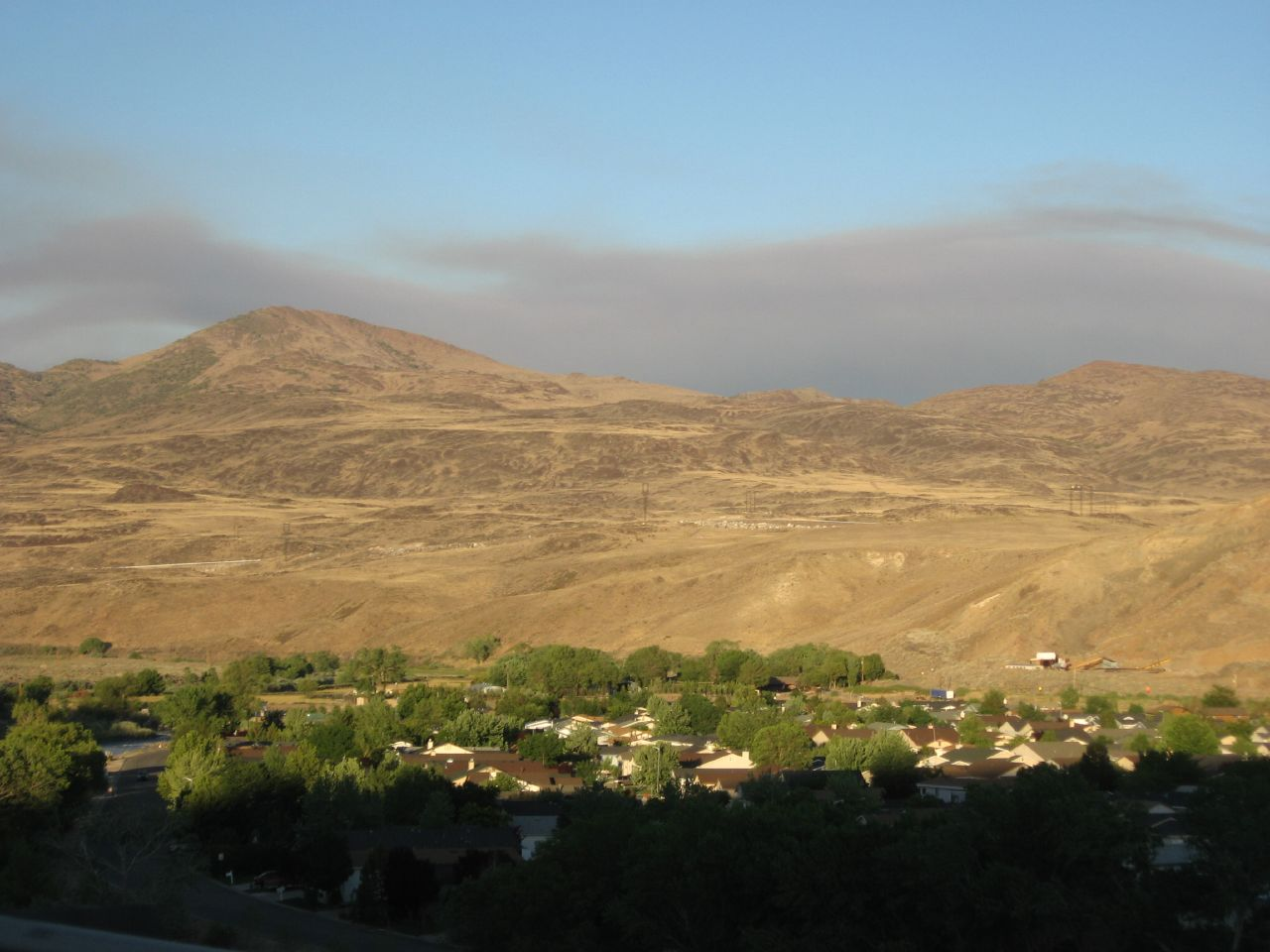
- Lockwood, June 2007

- Location within the state of Nevada Lockwood, Nevada (the United States)
- Coordinates: 39°30′26″N 119°38′48″W
- Country: United States
- State: Nevada
- County: Storey
- Elevation: 4,360 ft (1,329 m)
- Time zone: UTC-8 (Pacific (PST))
  - Summer (DST): UTC-7 (PDT)
- ZIP Code: 89434
- Area code: 775
- GNIS feature ID: 856069

Lockwood is an unincorporated community on the northern edge of Storey County, Nevada, United States, about 10 miles (16 km) east of Reno and Sparks. Lockwood is part of the Reno-Sparks Metropolitan Area.

== Description ==
The community of Lockwood lies between the Truckee River on the north and the Virginia Range on the south. It is connected to the Reno-Sparks area by a bridge over the Truckee River on Canyon Way that connects the area with an interchange (Exit 22) on Interstate 80 (across the Washoe County line).

In addition to outlying residences, Lockwood is home to two communities: the Rainbowbend subdivision and the Lockwood Community Corporation mobile home park. The community also boasts its own parks, elementary school, community centers, and businesses. Lockwood is served by the Storey County Sheriff's Office and Storey County Fire Department, each having a substation in the community. Community resources include a clothing closet and food pantry.

== Education ==
Lockwood's elementary school, Hillside Elementary, serves Storey County School District students residing in the Lockwood area and attending Kindergarten through 5th grade. Class sizes are on average about one-third those of the neighboring districts. Older students attend either Virginia City Middle School (grades 6–8) or Virginia City High School (grades 9–12), both located in Virginia City.
