= 2000 United States presidential election in Nevada =

- November 7, 2000
- Turnout: 70%

Nominee	George W. Bush	Al Gore
Party	Republican	Democratic
Home state	Texas	Tennessee
Running mate	Dick Cheney	Joe Lieberman
Electoral vote	4	0
Popular vote	301,575	279,978
Percentage	49.52%	45.98%
County results
Bush
50–60%
60–70%
70–80%
Gore
50–60%
President before election
Bill Clinton
Democratic
Elected President
George W. Bush
Republican

The 2000 United States presidential election in Nevada took place on November 7, 2000, and was part of the 2000 United States presidential election. Voters chose four representatives, or electors to the Electoral College, who voted for president and vice president.

Nevada was won by Texas Governor George W. Bush, who won the state with 49.52% of the vote over Al Gore, who took 45.98%. Bush won every county except Clark County, which is home of Las Vegas. Bush also won Nevada's 2nd congressional district, as Gore won Nevada's 1st congressional district. Also, Ralph Nader got over 2% of the vote. This was also the most recent presidential election (while also being the only time since 1976, and the second time since 1908) in which Nevada did not side with the winner of the popular vote. Nevada was one of many states decided by close margins; had Gore won the Silver State's four electoral votes, the election would have gone his way.

Nevada weighed in as 2% more Republican than the national average; in the previous election, it was 4% more Republican. The state was returned to the Republican column regardless. This is the first time New Mexico and Nevada have ever voted for different candidates since New Mexico's first election in 1912. Nevada was one of nine states that had supported Clinton twice that Gore (who was the sitting vice president at the time of the election) lost to Bush.

As of 2024, this is the last time that Nevada did not back the winner of the national popular vote, giving it the current longest streak of any state nationwide.

== General election ==
=== Polling ===
Poll source	Date(s)	Sample size	Margin of error	George W. Bush (R)	Al Gore (D)	Ralph Nader (G)	Other / undecided (Note: Calculated by taking the difference of 100% and all other listed candidates combined. For polls that do not report a figure for Nader, this includes his support.)
Harris Insights & Analytics	November 3, 2000	1,835	—	48%	45%	4%	3%
SurveyUSA	November 1, 2000	500	—	49%	44%	—	7%
Mason-Dixon Polling & Strategy	October 27, 2000	625	—	47%	43%	2%	8%
Rasmussen Reports	October 23, 2000	817	—	49%	37%	—	14%

=== Results ===
2000 United States presidential election in Nevada
Party	Candidate	Votes	Percentage	Electoral votes
Republican	George W. Bush	301,575	49.52%	4
Democratic	Al Gore	279,978	45.98%	0
Green	Ralph Nader	15,008	2.46%	0
Reform	Patrick Buchanan	4,747	0.78%	0
N/A	None of these candidates	3,315	0.54%	0
Libertarian	Harry Browne	3,311	0.54%	0
Ind. American	Howard Phillips	621	0.10%	0
Natural Law	John Hagelin	415	0.07%	0
Totals		608,970	100.00%	4
Voter turnout (Voting age/registered)				41%/70%

==== By county ====
County	George W. Bush Republican		Al Gore Democratic		Various candidates Other parties		Margin		Total
County	#	%	#	%	#	%	#	%	Total
Carson City	11,084	56.98%	7,354	37.81%	1,014	5.21%	3,730	19.17%	19,452
Churchill	6,237	70.69%	2,191	24.83%	395	4.48%	4,046	45.86%	8,823
Clark	170,932	44.72%	196,100	51.31%	15,166	3.97%	-25,168	-6.59%	382,198
Douglas	11,193	62.27%	5,837	32.47%	944	5.25%	5,356	29.80%	17,974
Elko	11,025	77.75%	2,542	17.93%	613	4.32%	8,483	59.82%	14,180
Esmeralda	333	67.82%	116	23.63%	42	8.55%	217	44.19%	491
Eureka	632	75.51%	150	17.92%	55	6.57%	482	57.59%	837
Humboldt	3,638	72.33%	1,128	22.43%	264	5.25%	2,510	49.90%	5,030
Lander	1,619	76.40%	395	18.64%	105	4.96%	1,224	57.76%	2,119
Lincoln	1,372	70.14%	461	23.57%	123	6.29%	911	46.57%	1,956
Lyon	7,270	60.62%	3,955	32.98%	767	6.40%	3,315	27.64%	11,992
Mineral	1,227	53.51%	916	39.95%	150	6.54%	311	13.56%	2,293
Nye	6,904	56.68%	4,525	37.15%	752	6.17%	2,379	19.53%	12,181
Pershing	1,221	67.76%	476	26.42%	105	5.83%	745	41.34%	1,802
Storey	1,014	56.40%	666	37.04%	118	6.56%	348	19.36%	1,798
Washoe	63,640	52.04%	52,097	42.60%	6,564	5.37%	11,543	9.44%	122,301
White Pine	2,234	63.05%	1,069	30.17%	240	6.77%	1,165	32.88%	3,543
Totals	301,575	49.52%	279,978	45.98%	27,417	4.50%	21,597	3.54%	608,970

===== Counties that flipped from Democratic to Republican =====
- Mineral (largest city: Hawthorne)

==== By congressional district ====
Bush and Gore each won a congressional district.

District	Gore	Bush	Representative
1st	54%	42%	Shelley Berkley
2nd	41%	54%	Jim Gibbons

== Electors ==
Technically the voters of Nevada cast their ballots for electors: representatives to the Electoral College. Nevada is allocated 4 electors because it has two congressional districts and two senators. All candidates who appear on the ballot or qualify to receive write-in votes must submit a list of four electors, who pledge to vote for their candidate and their running mate. Whoever wins the majority of votes in the state is awarded all four electoral votes. Their chosen electors then vote for president and vice president. Although electors are pledged to their candidate and running mate, they are not obligated to vote for them. An elector who votes for someone other than their candidate is known as a faithless elector.

The electors of each state and the District of Columbia met on December 18, 2000 to cast their votes for president and vice president. The Electoral College itself never meets as one body. Instead the electors from each state and the District of Columbia met in their respective capitols.

The following were the members of the Electoral College from the state. All were pledged to and voted for George W. Bush and Dick Cheney:

1. Jane Ham
2. Trudy Hushbeck
3. William Raggio
4. Tom Wiesner

== See also ==
- United States presidential elections in Nevada
