= 1908 United States presidential election in Nevada =

- November 3, 1908
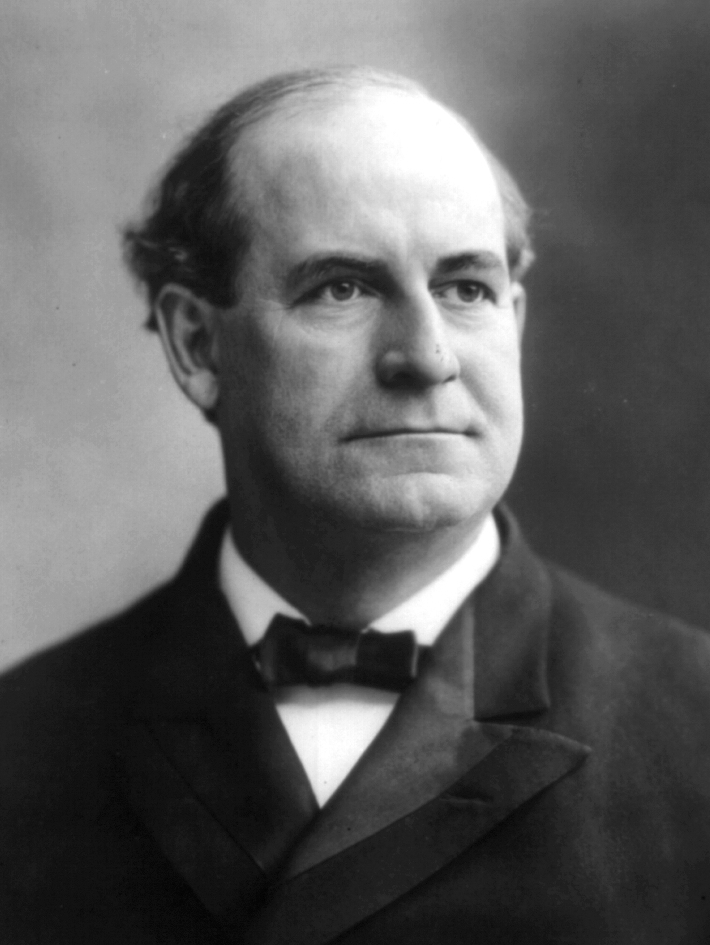

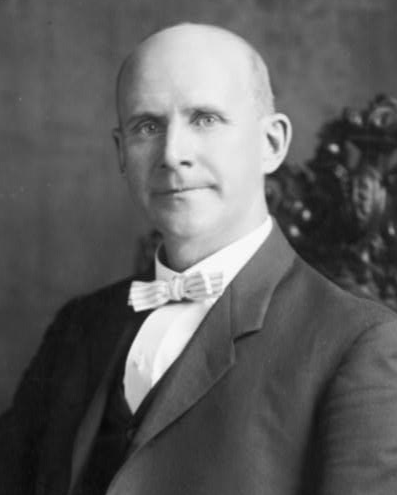
Nominee	William Jennings Bryan	William Howard Taft	Eugene V. Debs
Party	Democratic	Republican	Socialist
Home state	Nebraska	Ohio	Indiana
Running mate	John W. Kern	James S. Sherman	Ben Hanford
Electoral vote	3	0	0
Popular vote	11,212	10,775	2,103
Percentage	45.71%	43.93%	8.57%
County results
Bryan
40–50%
Taft
40–50%
50–60%
President before election
Theodore Roosevelt
Republican
Elected President
William Howard Taft
Republican

The 1908 United States presidential election in Nevada was held on November 3, 1908, as part of the 1908 United States presidential election. Voters chose three representatives, or electors to the Electoral College, who voted for president and vice president.

Nevada was won by Democratic nominee William Jennings Bryan and his running mate John W. Kern. They defeated the Republican Party nominee William Howard Taft and his running mate James S. Sherman. Bryan won the state by a narrow margin of 1.78%.

Socialist candidate Eugene V. Debs received his highest percentage nationally in Nevada with 8.57% of the vote. Bryan, who had also carried the state against William McKinley in both 1896 and 1900 saw a loss of 35.50% from his 1896 vote and of 16.54% from his 1900 vote.

The six Democratic Nevada delegates were selected at the state convention held in Carson City and consisted of Senator Francis G. Newlands, Governor Denver S. Dickerson, Winfield Scott Elliott, Ed W. Clark, John Sunderland, and Charles R. Evans with A. W. Dawley, Charles Green, Thomas Dunn, journalist A. P. Bettersworth, Fred L. White, and Captain G. W. Thatcher serving as alternative delegates with instruction to vote for Bryan. Recently elected Governor Dickerson lead the Nevada delegation at the Democratic national convention.

The five Republican Nevada delegates were selected at the state convention held in Winnemucca and consisted of J. F. Douglas, P. L. Flanigan, Wm. Easton, Hugh Brown, and Geo Russell and were to be accompanied by Senator George S. Nixon and were left uninstructed as to whom to vote for, but stated that they favored Taft. M. D. Staunton, John G. Thompson, O. R. Morgan, O. J. Smith, and R. W. Parry were selected as alternative delegates.

In September Eugene V. Debs made a short stop in Caliente and addressed a crowd during a train stop. On October 31 a political rally in favor of Taft was held in Reno where Senatorial candidate P. L. Flanigan, former Nevada Supreme Court Justice William A. Massey, and others spoke in favor of Taft, their candidacies, and of the Republican platform.

This was the last presidential election where a Democrat carried Nevada without winning the presidency until 2016, and remains the last time that the state has supported a Democrat who lost the popular vote.

== Results ==
General Election Results
Party	Pledged to	Elector	Votes
Democratic Party	William Jennings Bryan	Charles S. Sprague	11,212
Democratic Party	William Jennings Bryan	L. L. Hudson	11,192
Democratic Party	William Jennings Bryan	J. A. Miller Sr.	11,164
Republican Party	William Howard Taft	J. G. Thompson	10,775
Republican Party	William Howard Taft	H. A. Comins	10,726
Republican Party	William Howard Taft	W. R. Thomas	10,703
Socialist Party	Eugene V. Debs	J. B. Gibson	2,103
Socialist Party	Eugene V. Debs	Charles T. Williams	2,078
Socialist Party	Eugene V. Debs	E. A. Anderson	2,076
Independence Party	Thomas L. Hisgen	H. W. Miles	436
Independence Party	Thomas L. Hisgen	Martin Dean	436
Independence Party	Thomas L. Hisgen	J. G. Hagerman	425
Votes cast (Note: Based on totals for highest elector on each ticket)			24,526

=== Results by county ===
County	William Jennings Bryan Democratic		William Howard Taft Republican		Eugene V. Debs Socialist		Thomas L. Hisgen Independence League		Margin		Total votes cast (Note: Based on highest elector on each ticket)
County	#	%	#	%	#	%	#	%	#	%	Total votes cast
Churchill	382	45.53%	389	46.36%	56	6.67%	12	1.43%	-7	-0.83%	839
Douglas	173	41.29%	229	54.65%	17	4.06%	0	0.00%	-56	-13.37%	419
Elko	804	48.49%	737	44.45%	89	5.37%	28	1.69%	67	4.04%	1,658
Esmeralda	2,787	48.18%	2,208	38.17%	632	10.93%	157	2.71%	579	10.01%	5,784
Eureka	218	45.32%	224	46.57%	26	5.41%	13	2.70%	-6	-1.25%	481
Humboldt	1,009	49.12%	823	40.07%	194	9.44%	28	1.36%	186	9.06%	2,054
Lander	276	48.08%	257	44.77%	34	5.92%	7	1.22%	19	3.31%	574
Lincoln	768	47.55%	690	42.72%	139	8.61%	18	1.11%	78	4.83%	1,615
Lyon	364	39.78%	458	50.05%	74	8.09%	19	2.08%	-94	-10.27%	915
Nye	1,219	43.96%	1,124	40.53%	333	12.01%	97	3.50%	95	3.43%	2,773
Ormsby	343	45.67%	350	46.60%	52	6.92%	6	0.80%	-7	-0.93%	751
Storey	402	43.93%	447	48.85%	54	5.90%	12	1.31%	-45	-4.92%	915
Washoe	1,745	42.51%	2,053	50.01%	281	6.85%	26	0.63%	-308	-7.50%	4,105
White Pine	722	43.94%	786	47.84%	122	7.43%	13	0.79%	-64	-3.90%	1,643
Totals	11,212	45.71%	10,775	43.93%	2,103	8.57%	436	1.78%	437	1.78%	24,526

==== Counties that flipped from Republican to Democratic ====
- Elko
- Esmeralda
- Humboldt
- Lander
- Lincoln
- Nye

== See also ==
- United States presidential elections in Nevada
