= 1992 United States presidential election in Nevada =

- November 3, 1992

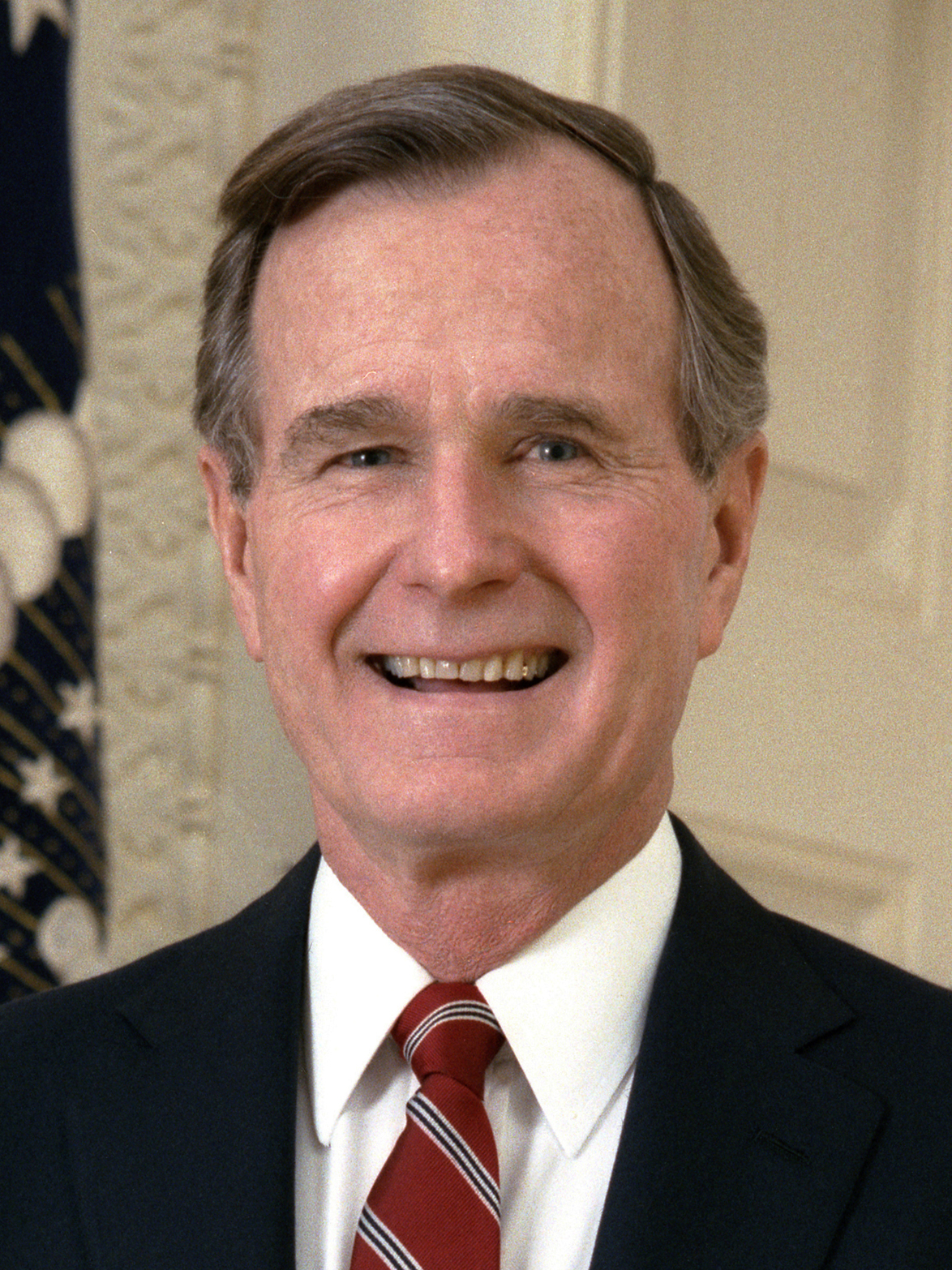

| Nominee | Bill Clinton | George H. W. Bush | Ross Perot |
| Party | Democratic | Republican | Independent |
| Home state | Arkansas | Texas | Texas |
| Running mate | Al Gore | Dan Quayle | James Stockdale |
| Electoral vote | 4 | 0 | 0 |
| Popular vote | 189,148 | 175,828 | 132,580 |
| Percentage | 37.36% | 34.73% | 26.19% |
County results
Clinton
30–40%
40–50%
Bush
30–40%
40–50%
Perot
30–40%
President before election
George H. W. Bush
Republican
Elected President
Bill Clinton
Democratic

The 1992 United States presidential election in Nevada took place on November 3, 1992, as part of the 1992 United States presidential election. Voters chose four representatives, or electors to the Electoral College, who voted for president and vice president.

Nevada was won by Governor Bill Clinton (D-Arkansas) with 37.36% of the popular vote over incumbent President George H. W. Bush (R-Texas) with 34.73%. Businessman Ross Perot (I-Texas) finished in third, with 26.19% of the popular vote. Clinton ultimately won the national vote, defeating incumbent President Bush and Perot.

Clinton's win in the state, although narrow, marked the first time since 1964 that a Democrat would carry Nevada and the beginning of its transition from a fairly Republican state into a swing state, like it had been in most elections prior to 1968. The state would go on to back the national winner in every election onward until 2016. Although Clinton carried only two of the state's seventeen counties, his win in Clark County, where Las Vegas is located, and the most populous county in the state, would prove the key to this and future Democratic victories in Nevada.

Clinton's percentage of the vote was the lowest to win a state since Woodrow Wilson carried only 32.08 percent of the vote in Idaho in 1912. As of the 2024 presidential election, this is the last time a Democratic presidential candidate carried White Pine County in a presidential election, and the last one where a candidate outside the two major parties carried any Nevada county. In this case, Ross Perot carried Storey County.

== Results ==
1992 United States presidential election in Nevada
| Party | Candidate | Votes | Percentage | Electoral votes |
|---|---|---|---|---|
| Democratic | Bill Clinton | 189,148 | 37.36% | 4 |
| Republican | George H. W. Bush (incumbent) | 175,828 | 34.73% | 0 |
| Independent | Ross Perot | 132,580 | 26.19% | 0 |
| America First | James "Bo" Gritz | 2,892 | 0.57% | 0 |
| N/A | "None of these candidates" | 2,537 | 0.50% | 0 |
| Libertarian | Andre Marrou | 1,835 | 0.36% | 0 |
| American Independent | Howard Phillips | 677 | 0.13% | 0 |
| New Alliance | Lenora Fulani | 483 | 0.10% | 0 |
| Natural Law | Dr. John Hagelin | 338 | 0.07% | 0 |
| Totals | | 506,318 | 100.0% | 4 |

=== Results by county ===
| County | Bill Clinton Democratic | | George H.W. Bush Republican | | Ross Perot Independent | | Various candidates Other parties | | Margin | | Total votes cast |
| County | # | % | # | % | # | % | # | % | # | % | Total votes cast |
|---|---|---|---|---|---|---|---|---|---|---|---|
| Carson City | 6,035 | 32.10% | 7,302 | 38.83% | 5,195 | 27.63% | 271 | 1.44% | -1,267 | -6.73% | 18,803 |
| Churchill | 1,770 | 23.10% | 3,789 | 49.45% | 1,964 | 25.63% | 140 | 1.83% | -1,825 (Note: In this county where Clinton ran third behind Bush and Perot, margin given is Bush vote minus Perot vote and percentage is Bush percentage minus Perot percentage.) | -23.82% | 7,663 |
| Clark | 124,586 | 41.15% | 97,403 | 32.17% | 75,364 | 24.89% | 5,429 | 1.79% | 27,183 | 8.98% | 302,782 |
| Douglas | 3,928 | 25.94% | 6,182 | 40.82% | 4,814 | 31.79% | 221 | 1.46% | -1,368 | -9.03% | 15,145 |
| Elko | 2,782 | 23.33% | 5,208 | 43.67% | 3,628 | 30.42% | 308 | 2.58% | -1,580 | -13.25% | 11,926 |
| Esmeralda | 118 | 20.21% | 221 | 37.84% | 220 | 37.67% | 25 | 4.28% | -1 | -0.17% | 584 |
| Eureka | 129 | 18.70% | 330 | 47.83% | 214 | 31.01% | 17 | 2.46% | -116 | -16.82% | 690 |
| Humboldt | 810 | 22.99% | 1,505 | 42.72% | 1,149 | 32.61% | 59 | 1.67% | -356 | -10.11% | 3,523 |
| Lander | 423 | 21.23% | 885 | 44.43% | 652 | 32.73% | 32 | 1.61% | -233 | -11.70% | 1,992 |
| Lincoln | 511 | 27.52% | 890 | 47.93% | 394 | 21.22% | 62 | 3.34% | -379 | -20.41% | 1,857 |
| Lyon | 2,777 | 30.17% | 3,509 | 38.12% | 2,716 | 29.51% | 202 | 2.19% | -732 | -7.95% | 9,204 |
| Mineral | 909 | 34.42% | 918 | 34.76% | 746 | 28.25% | 68 | 2.57% | -9 | -0.34% | 2,641 |
| Nye | 2,561 | 31.92% | 2,743 | 34.19% | 2,501 | 31.18% | 217 | 2.71% | -182 | -2.27% | 8,022 |
| Pershing | 467 | 29.82% | 643 | 41.06% | 429 | 27.39% | 27 | 1.72% | -176 | -11.24% | 1,566 |
| Storey | 488 | 32.13% | 458 | 30.15% | 550 | 36.21% | 23 | 1.51% | -62 (Note: In this county where Bush ran third behind Clinton and Perot, margin given is Clinton vote minus Perot vote and percentage is Clinton percentage minus Perot percentage.) | -4.08% | 1,519 |
| Washoe | 39,500 | 34.45% | 42,636 | 37.18% | 30,974 | 27.01% | 1,561 | 1.36% | -3,136 | -2.73% | 114,671 |
| White Pine | 1,354 | 36.30% | 1,206 | 32.33% | 1,070 | 28.69% | 100 | 2.68% | 148 | 3.97% | 3,730 |
| Totals | 189,148 | 37.36% | 175,828 | 34.73% | 132,580 | 26.19% | 8,762 | 1.73% | 13,320 | 2.63% | 506,318 |

==== Counties that flipped from Republican to Democratic ====
- Clark
- White Pine

==== Counties that flipped from Republican to Independent ====
- Storey

== See also ==
- United States presidential elections in Nevada
