= Sarcobatus Flat =

Valley in Nye County, Nevada

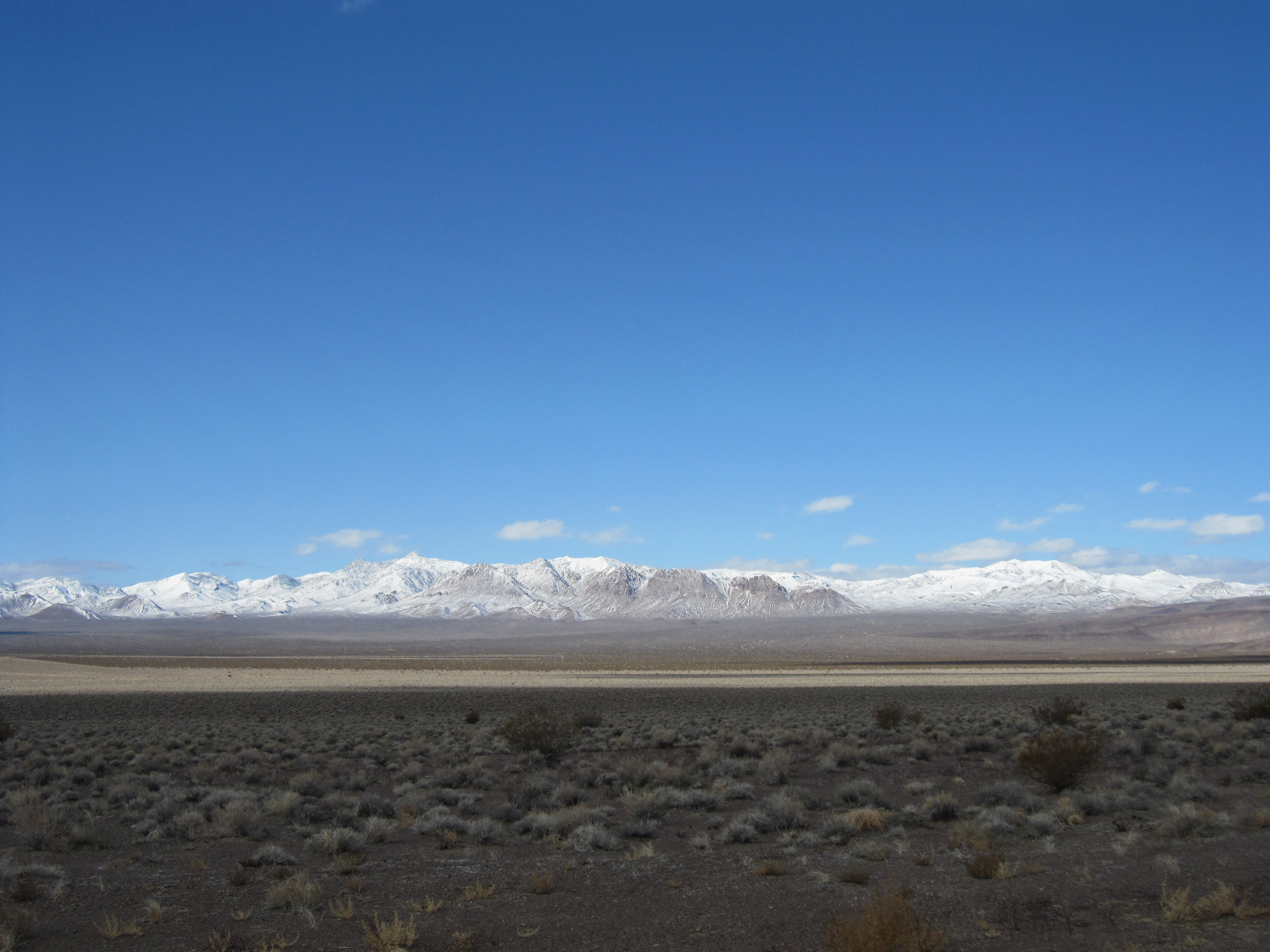

- Location within Nevada

Geography
- Location: Nye County, Nevada
- Coordinates: 37°12′26″N 117°5′43″W
- Interactive map of Sarcobatus Flat

Sarcobatus Flat is a closed valley in western Nye County, Nevada between Goldfield and Beatty. The Bullfrog Hills form the southern boundary and the Grapevine Mountains along with Bonnie Claire Flat form the western boundary. Pahute Mesa bounds the area to the east and north. To the north the flat is contiguous with Lida Valley and Stonewall Flat.

US Route 95 traverses the northeast side of the flat between Springdale at the north end of the Bullfrog Hills and Scotty's Junction and on to Stonewall Pass between Slate Ridge on the west and Stonewall Mountain on the east. At Scotty's Junction Nevada State Route 267 heads southeast to Bonnie Claire and on to the Death Valley National Park in California. The Nevada portion of the park extends into the southern portion of the Flat along the northern flanks of the Bullfrog Hills. Nellis Air Force Base occupies a portion along the northeast margin of the Flat.

The lowest area within the flat is the salt flat just east of Bonnie Claire at an elevation of 3943 feet. Bonnie Peak at the north end of a spur of the Grapevine Mountains and less than one mile west-southwest of the low point has an elevation of 4969 feet. Further south Grapevine Peak rises to an elevation of 8737 feet along the crest of the Grapevines adjacent to the California border. Grapevine Peak lies about six miles west of the Sarcobatus floor in the southern portion.

The Flat is one of the Central Nevada Desert Basins that, along with Cactus Flat to the northeast constitutes the larger Cactus-Sarcobatus Watershed. The flat is considered part of the Tonopah Basin and is separated from the Amargosa Valley of the Mojave Desert to the south.
