= Scotty's Junction, Nevada =

Unincorporated community in Nevada, US

Coordinates: 37°17′56″N 117°03′10″W

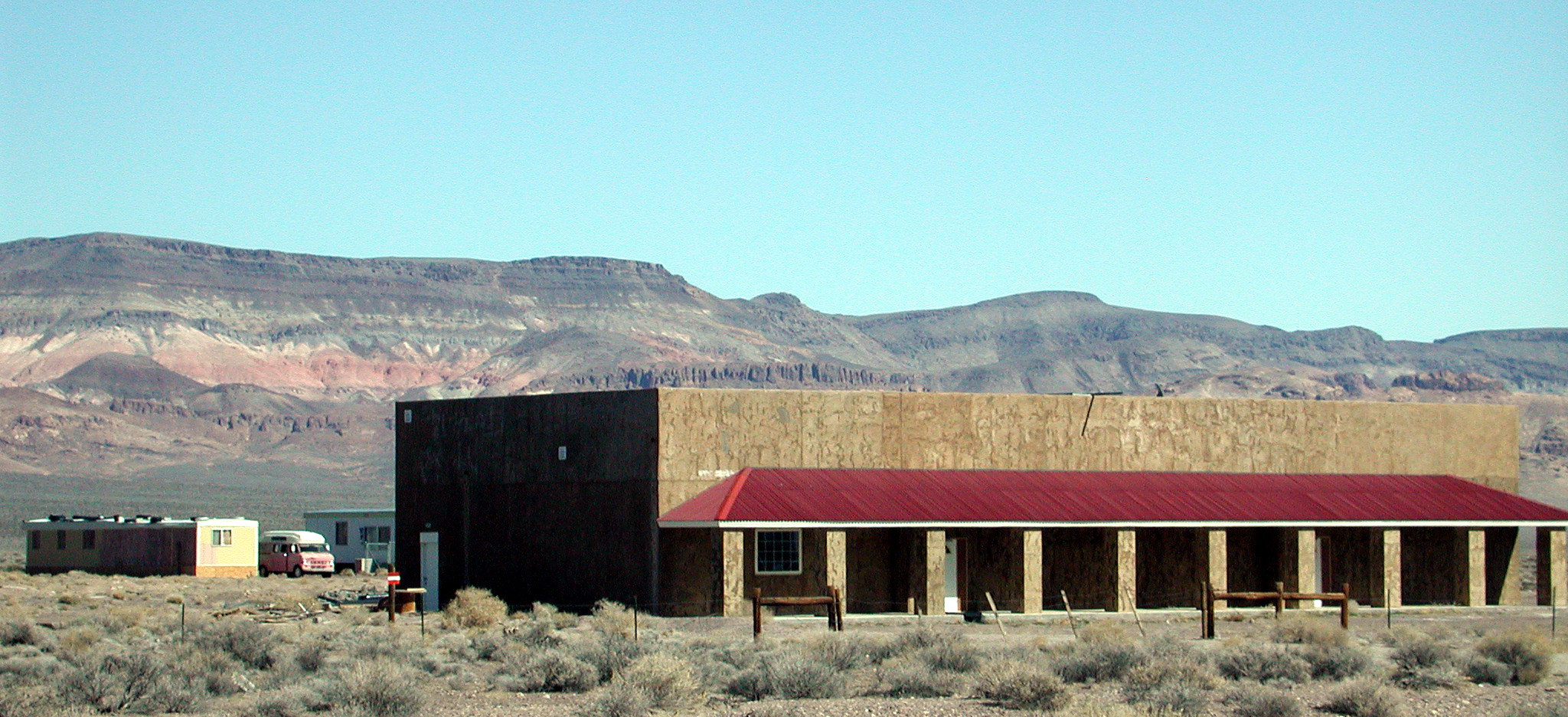
Buildings at Scotty's Junction with the rim of Pahute Mesa to the northeast

Scotty's Junction is an unincorporated community in the Sarcobatus Flat of Nye County, Nevada where State Route 267 meets with U.S. Route 95 at an elevation of 4,062 feet (1,238 m).

It was named after Walter E. Scott (a.k.a. Death Valley Scotty, of nearby Scotty's Castle fame).

Nevada Public Radio maintains translator station K201BF in the area, retransmitting KNPR in Las Vegas on 88.1 FM.

== History ==
Scotty's Junction was originally a stop on the Bullfrog Goldfield Railroad (BGR) at Sarcobatus Flat/Tolicha for the Bonnie Claire Mines and the town of Bonnie Claire. The BGR was a short-lived railroad and it along with the Las Vegas and Tonopah Railroad (LV&T) were acquired by the Tonopah and Tidewater Railroad (T&T) and combined for the shortest route. Supplies to build Scotty's Castle were trucked from the Bonnie Claire Depot to the castle site. In fact, the last delivery this train would ever make would be construction supplies for Scotty's Castle, the tracks were literally torn up and scrapped after this last delivery and the ties taken to the castle to be used for firewood.

The Timbisha Shoshone Homeland Act of 2000 provides for transfer to the Timbisha tribe of 2800 acres (11 km^{2}) of land and an annual 375.5 acre-feet (463,200 m^{3}) of ground water around Scotty's Junction.
