= KLGU =

KLGU may refer to:

- KLGU (FM), a radio station (90.3 FM) licensed to St. George, Utah, United States
- KLGU-LP, a defunct low-power radio station (106.1 FM) formerly licensed to Logan, Utah, United States
- the ICAO code for Logan-Cache Airport, in Logan, Utah, United States
