= Bonnie Claire, Nevada =

Bonnie Claire
- Ghost town
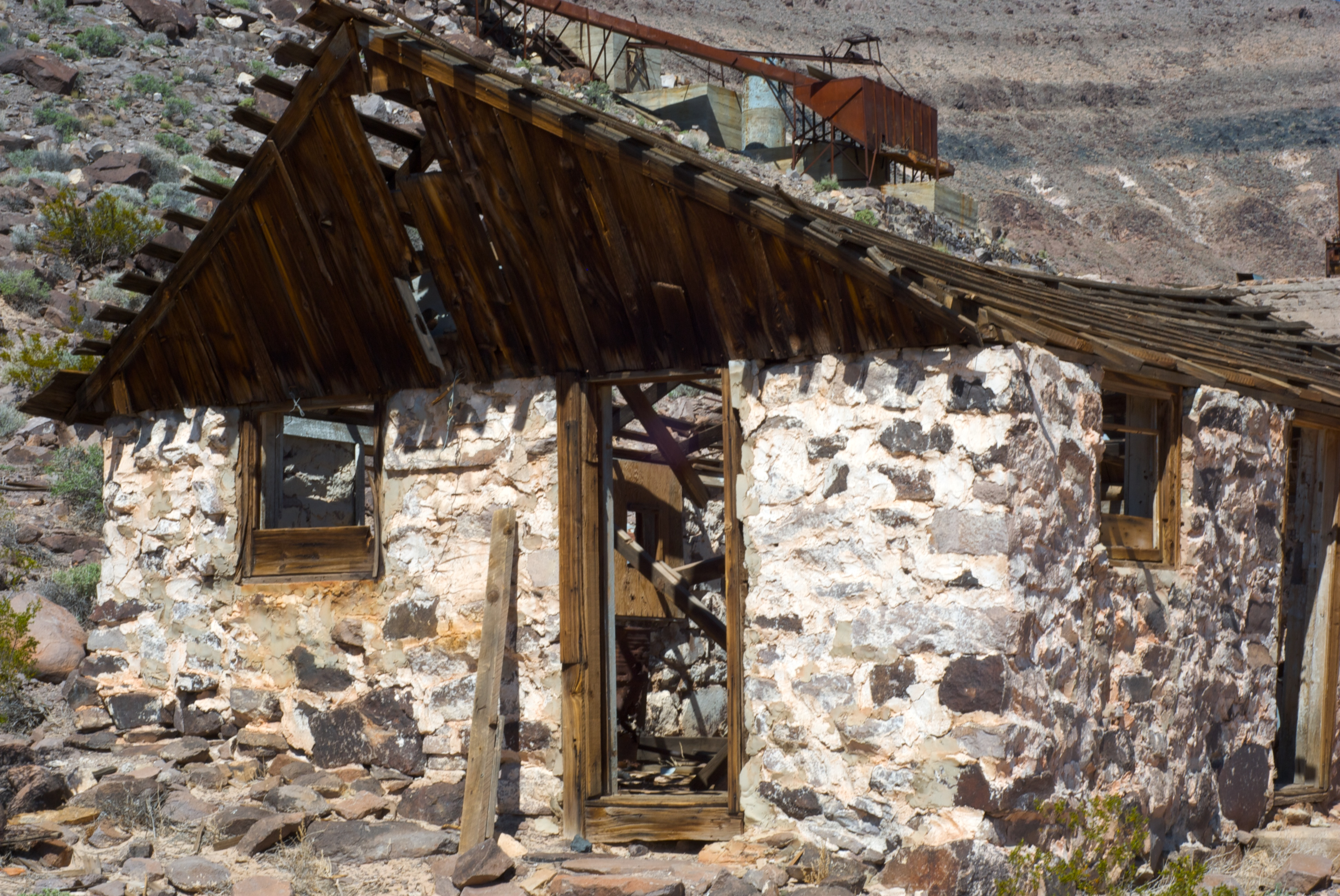
- Abandoned bunkhouse at the Bonnie Claire Mine; ruins of the mine shaft head in the background.

- Location within Nevada
- Coordinates: 37°13′36″N 117°07′15″W
- Country: United States
- County: Nye
- State: Nevada
- Elevation: 3,980 ft (1,213 m)
- Time zone: UTC-8 (Pacific (PST))
  - Summer (DST): PDT (UTC-7)
- GNIS feature ID: 863886

Bonnie Claire is a ghost town located in Nye County, Nevada. The settlement is located on the edge of Sarcobatus Flat adjacent to Nevada State Route 267. The mines of Slate Ridge lie to the northwest and the northernmost spur of the Amargosa Range, the Grapevine Mountains, is just to the south of the townsite. Bonnie Claire Flat extends to the southwest between the Slate Ridge and the Grapevines to the California border.

== History ==
The town had its beginnings in 1906 to support the gold mines in the Slate Ridge area. It replaced an earlier camp known as Thorp's Wells which had started in the 1880s to process the ore from Gold Mountain. When the Bullfrog-Goldfield Railroad arrived in 1906 followed by the Las Vegas and Tonopah Railroad business boomed and the site was renamed. After the mines played out the town declined after 1914. In the 1920s the town became a supply point for the construction of Scotty's Castle located in Death Valley about 20 miles to the southwest. The post office was called Thorp from June 1905 until July 1909 and then renamed to Bonnie Claire from July 1909 until it closed in December 1931.

The population was 7 in 1940.

In 2005 Tonogold Resources initiated the "Bonnie Claire Gold Tailings Project" to rework 12 million tons of tailings. This project, at Bonnie Claire, followed shortly after Tonogold's successful reworking of Big Mill's tailings.
