= KVNV =

KVNV may refer to:

- KVNV (FM), a radio station (89.1 FM) licensed to serve Sun Valley, Nevada, United States
- WJLP, a television station (channel 3) licensed to serve Middletown Township, New Jersey, United States, which held the call sign KVNV from 2005 to 2014
