= KVNV (FM) =

Simulcasts KNPR, Las Vegas
- Sun Valley, Nevada; United States
- Broadcast area: Reno, Nevada
- Frequency: 89.1 MHz (HD Radio)

Programming
- Language: English
- Format: News/Talk (Public Radio)

Ownership
- Owner: Nevada Public Radio
- Sister stations: KCNV, KLKR, KLNR, KNPR, KTPH, KWPR

History
- First air date: October 2014
- Former call signs: KXNV (2012–2015); KJIV (2015–2017)

Technical information
- Licensing authority: FCC
- Facility ID: 172600
- Class: C2
- ERP: 790 watts
- HAAT: 863 meters (2,831 ft)
- Transmitter coordinates: 39°45′36.6″N 119°28′3.6″W
- Translator: See § Simulcasting stations

Links
- Public license information: Public file; LMS
- Webcast: Listen live
- Website: knpr.org

KVNV (89.1 FM) is a non-commercial radio station near Reno, Nevada. It broadcasts a news/talk format with programming from Nevada Public Radio and National Public Radio.

KVNV began broadcasting under the callsign KXNV, branded as Radio Free Reno and was owned by Open Sky Media. In 2015 its callsign was changed to KJIV and it was rebranded as The Fine 89. KVNV was acquired by Nevada Public Radio for $550,000 in November 2016; the purchase was consummated on February 17, 2017. The Fine 89 changed their branding to JiveRadio and continues to operate online with content aimed for the Reno area.

Subsequently broadcasting an adult album alternative format under the branding "NV-89", KVNV flipped to a full simulcast of KNPR on September 6, 2019. The change was necessitated due to funding shortfalls at Nevada Public Radio that forced the organization to lay off its Reno-based staffers. This was intended as a temporary measure until it could find a buyer for KVNV. KSGU in St. George, Utah was also put up for sale. While it was able to find a buyer for KSGU, it has been unable to do so for KVNV.

== Simulcasting stations ==
Programming from KVNV has one direct translator, located in Carson City. Until 2019, it was also simulcast on the second HD Radio channels of Nevada Public Radio's other stations.

Broadcast translator for KVNV
Call sign	Frequency	City of license	FID	ERP (W)	FCC info
K263BL	100.5 FM	Carson City, Nevada	147869	99	LMS
