= Ludwig, Nevada =

Ghost town, Lyons County

Coordinates: 38°57′20″N 119°16′45″W

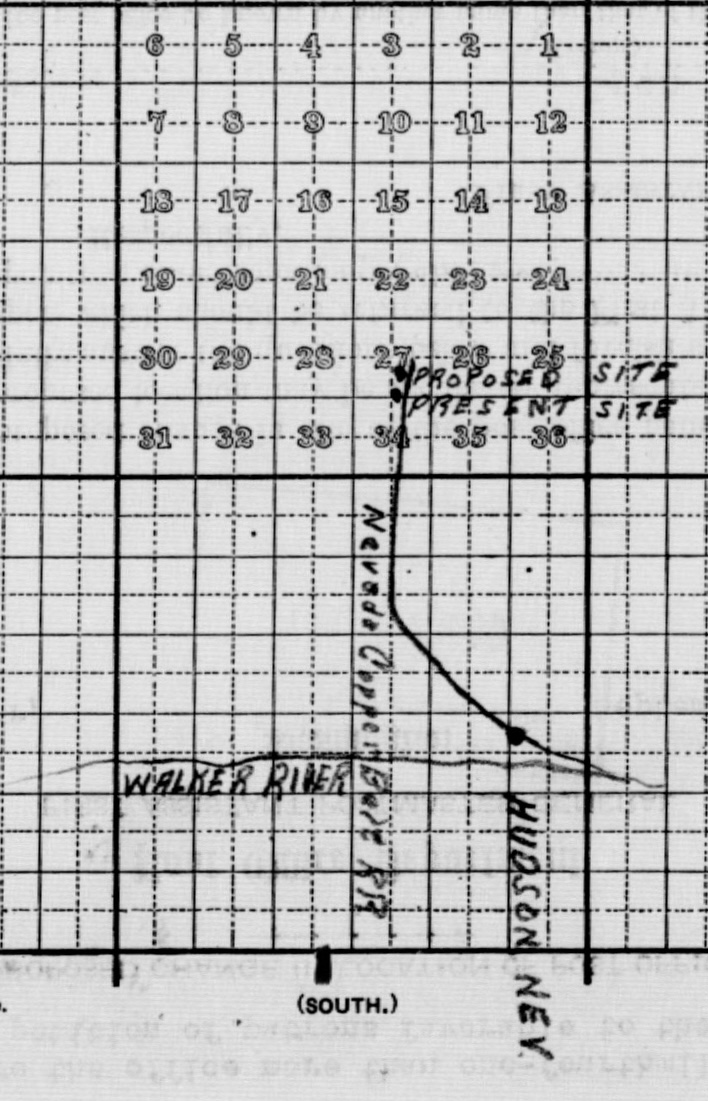
Map from 1930 application to relocate Ludwig, Nevada post office

Ludwig, Nevada is a ghost town in Lyon County, Nevada, United States. Mining for gypsum at the site resumed in 2013.

== History ==
Ludwig was part of the Yerington mining district known for its copper ore production. The town was named for John D. Ludwig, a "California Indian fighter" affiliated with the Trinity Rangers. The town was big enough from 1911 to 1932 to warrant its own post office. At its peak the town had about 1,000 residents.

The previous post office in the vicinity was called Morningstar.

According to the Nevada Appeal, "The site features several concrete mill structures, many of which were painted with Egyptian symbols since the mines closed...the site is not safe for members of the public, and people should avoid mines whether they are active or closed."

== Hot springs ==
Among other attractions near Ludwig was a stop on the Nevada Copper Belt Railroad that also provided access to the Smith Valley Hot Springs resort. The resort didn't last long but the pool survived; local high school kids regularly visited "the plunge" in the 1940s. In 1968 a newspaper columnist reported that the railroad "built a concrete swimming pool to catch the hot springs waters. Years later, after railroad, accommodations and all are long gone, the hot springs and the pool are still there, although surrounded by a fence that can be outwitted."
