= Potts, Nevada =

- Ghost Town
- Location within Nevada
- Coordinates: 39°05′10″N 116°38′2″W
- Country: United States
- State: Nevada
- District: Nye County
- Elevation: 6,657 ft (2,029 m)
- Time zone: UTC-8 (Pacific)
  - Summer (DST): UTC-7 (PDT)

Potts is a ghost town and abandoned ranching property in Monitor Valley, Nye County, Nevada, approximately 2 miles east of Nevada State Route 82.

The ranch was founded by William Potts in the 1870s, and would remain in the Potts family until 1944 when the property was sold to Harvey Sewell and O. G. Bates. The Potts' spread, which was recognized as one of the finest cattle outfits in the state at the time, eventually came to include other properties, including the Butler, Morgan Creek, and Wilson ranches.

With Belmont, the nearest established community, being 37 miles away, a number of other ranches developing in Monitor Valley, and several small mining camps springing up on the eastern flank of the Toquima Range, the need developed for more localized postal facilities. The ranch was originally granted a post office in 1893, however the grant was rescinded before the office became operational. The grant was re-extended in 1898 and the post office, with various members of the Potts family acting as postmasters, operated from August 12, 1898 until October 31, 1941.

The old ranch house, while somewhat dilapidated, is still standing at the location. Hot springs located near the site are popular destinations for hot spring enthusiasts and are maintained well enough for modest recreational use.
