= KNPR =

Public radio station in Las Vegas

- Las Vegas, Nevada; United States
- Broadcast area: Las Vegas metropolitan area
- Frequency: 88.9 MHz (HD Radio)
- Branding: News 88.9 KNPR

Programming
- Format: Public Radio and talk
- Subchannels: HD2: Classical (KCNV); HD3: Jazz (KUNV)
- Affiliations: NPR; APM; PRX; BBC World Service; Institute for Nonprofit News

Ownership
- Owner: Nevada Public Radio
- Sister stations: KCNV, KBGZ, KLNR, KTPH, KVNV, KWPR

History
- First air date: March 24, 1980
- Former frequencies: 89.5 MHz (1980–2003)
- Call sign meaning: Nevada Public Radio

Technical information
- Licensing authority: FCC
- Facility ID: 79047
- Class: C
- ERP: 22,000 watts
- HAAT: 1,190 meters (3,900 ft)
- Transmitter coordinates: 35.9652°N 115.5005°W
- Translator: See § Translators
- Repeater: See § Repeaters

Links
- Public license information: Public file; LMS
- Webcast: Listen live
- Website: knpr.org

KNPR (88.9 FM, "News 88.9") is a non-commercial radio station licensed to Las Vegas, Nevada, United States. It is owned by Nevada Public Radio, and it airs news and talk programming from NPR and other public radio networks. As a sister station to classical music station KCNV (89.7 FM), the two stations share studios at the Donald W. Reynolds Broadcast Center on the West Charleston campus of the College of Southern Nevada on South Torrey Pines Drive in west Las Vegas.

KNPR's transmitter is on Potosi Mountain in Blue Diamond. Programming is simulcast on a network of repeater stations and FM translators throughout Nevada. KNPR broadcasts using HD Radio technology. Its HD2 subchannel carries the signal of KCNV and its HD3 subchannel carries jazz and other music from KUNV, owned by the University of Nevada, Las Vegas and broadcast from its School of Journalism.

== History ==
A group of Las Vegas-area residents started Nevada Public Radio in 1975 as a non-profit organization, wanting to bring public radio to the state. It sought a construction permit from the Federal Communications Commission to build a station.

KNPR signed on the air on March 24, 1980. It was founded by Lamar Marchese. KNPR was the first NPR member station in Nevada; KUNR in Reno signed on in 1963 but did not join NPR until 1981.

In its early years, KNPR carried a mix of NPR news programs along with classical music. At first it broadcast at 89.5 MHz. The studios were located along Boulder Highway on the property of Sam Boyd Stadium. The station was powered at 7,500 watts, one-third of its current output.

By the early 2000s, Nevada Public Radio wanted to have two stations to serve both audiences, those who wanted to hear news and information and those who preferred classical music. In 2003, KNPR moved to 88.9 and switched to a full time news and talk format. Classical music moved to a new sister station, KCNV at 89.7. In 2005, Nevada Public Radio acquired an additional transmitter, KSGU at St. George, Utah, but later sold it to the Educational Media Foundation in 2020.

== Programming ==
KNPR carries a news and information format with most shows provided by NPR and other public radio networks. Weekday programs include Morning Edition, All Things Considered, Fresh Air, Here and Now, The World and Marketplace. The BBC World Service runs overnight and for one hour at midday. KNPR produces a local hour of interviews and talk, State of Nevada, hosted by Joe Schoenmann. It is broadcast live at 9 a.m. and is repeated at 7 p.m.

NPR also publishes a magazine about Nevada living, Desert Companion.

== Repeaters ==
Call sign	Frequency	City of license	FID	FCC info
KLKR	89.3 FM	Elko, Nevada	174342	LMS
KWPR	88.7 FM	Lund, Nevada	90472	LMS
KLNR	91.7 FM	Panaca, Nevada	48350	LMS
KVNV	89.1 FM	Sun Valley, Nevada	172600	LMS
KTPH	91.7 FM	Tonopah, Nevada	48356	LMS

=== Translators ===
Call sign	Frequency	City of license	FID	FCC info
K219LM	91.7 FM	Lake Havasu City, Arizona	48355	LMS
K201AD	88.1 FM	China Lake, Etc., California	28593	LMS
K219AV	91.7 FM	Beatty, Nevada	49873	LMS
K208BB	89.5 FM	Laughlin, Etc., Nevada	48353	LMS
K201HX	88.1 FM	Mesquite, Nevada	48357	LMS
K210ET	89.9 FM	Moapa, Etc., Nevada	48352	LMS
K207CY	89.3 FM	Round Mountain, Nevada	92879	LMS
K201BF	88.1 FM	Scotty's Junction, Nevada	49874	LMS
