= Lockes, Nevada =

- Ghost Town
- Location within Nevada
- Coordinates: 38°33′18″N 115°46′30″W
- Country: United States
- State: Nevada
- District: Nye County
- Elevation: 4,810 ft (1,466 m)
- Time zone: UTC-8 (Pacific)
  - Summer (DST): UTC-7 (PDT)

Lockes, also known as Ostorside or Ostonside, is a ghost town on U.S. Highway 6 in eastern Nye County, Nevada. The site is approximately 73 miles by road southwest by south of Ely, Nevada and 95 miles by road northeast by east of Tonopah, Nevada, with the nearest town being Currant, 24 miles to the northeast along U.S. 6.

== History ==
The site, named for Eugene and Sara Locke, was first a prominent watering hole known as Keyser Springs along the Hamilton-Reveille road. The springs were homesteaded by a W. H. Reynolds in 1875, who then sold out to Eugene and Elisha Locke eight years later. Elisha moved to Eureka in 1890, and in 1893 the remaining Eugene married Sara Ernst. The Lockes built and operated a gas station and restaurant in the 1920s; this enterprise would remain in business over the next 30 years, and the remaining Locke family left in 1963.
