= KCNV =

Classical music public radio station in Las Vegas

Las Vegas, Nevada; United States
- Broadcast area: Las Vegas area
- Frequency: 89.7 MHz (HD Radio)
- Branding: Classical 89.7

Programming
- Format: Classical music (Public Radio)
- Affiliations: American Public Media; National Public Radio; Public Radio International

Ownership
- Owner: Nevada Public Radio
- Sister stations: KLKR, KLNR, KNPR, KTPH, KVNV, KWPR

History
- First air date: 1982

Technical information
- Licensing authority: FCC
- Facility ID: 48348
- Class: C2
- ERP: 550 watts
- HAAT: 1,122 meters (3,681 ft)
- Transmitter coordinates: 35°57′57″N 115°30′3″W
- Translator: § Translators
- Repeaters: KNPR-HD2 (88.9 FM, Las Vegas)

Links
- Public license information: Public file; LMS
- Webcast: Listen live
- Website: knpr.org

KCNV (89.7 FM) is a listener-supported public radio station with a classical music format. It is a part of Nevada Public Radio and features programming from American Public Media, National Public Radio and Public Radio International. KCNV airs nationally syndicated shows in the evening and on weekends, including the Chicago Symphony Orchestra and the New York Philharmonic. The NPR program From the Top, showcases young classical musicians. Pipedreams features organ music. Sunday Baroque, produced by WSHU-FM in Connecticut, features music composed in and around the Baroque era. As a sister station to KNPR (88.9 FM), the two stations share studios at the Donald W. Reynolds Broadcast Center on the West Charleston campus of the College of Southern Nevada on South Torrey Pines Drive in west Las Vegas.

KCNV has an effective radiated power of 550 watts. KCNV's signal in the Las Vegas Valley is substantially weaker than that of its sister station 88.9 KNPR, which broadcasts at 22,000 watts. KCNV's transmitter is near Potosi Mountain, off Potosi Mountain Road, amid the towers for other Las Vegas FM and TV stations in Clark County.

== Translators ==
In addition to the main station, KCNV is relayed by one translator to widen its broadcast area. KNPR and all but one of its repeaters (all except KVNV in Reno) also simulcast KCNV on their second digital channels.

| Call sign | Frequency | City of license | FID | FCC info |
|---|---|---|---|---|
| K296AI | 107.1 FM | China Lake, Etc., California | 28573 | LMS |
