= Las Vegas and Tonopah Railroad =

Former railway in the US

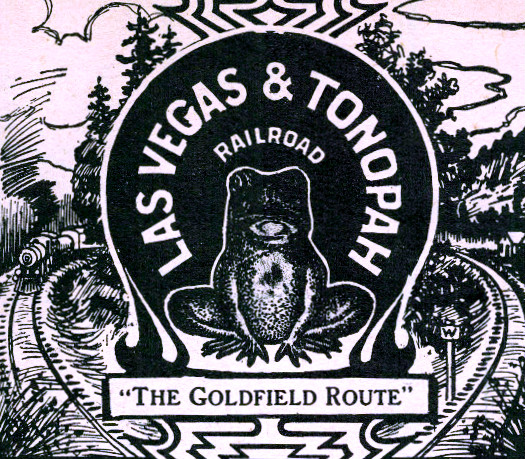

Overview
- Headquarters: Los Angeles, California
- Reporting mark: LV&T
- Locale: Las Vegas to Goldfield, Nevada
- Dates of operation: 1906–1918

Technical
- Track gauge: 4 ft 8 1/2 in (1,435 mm) standard gauge
Map
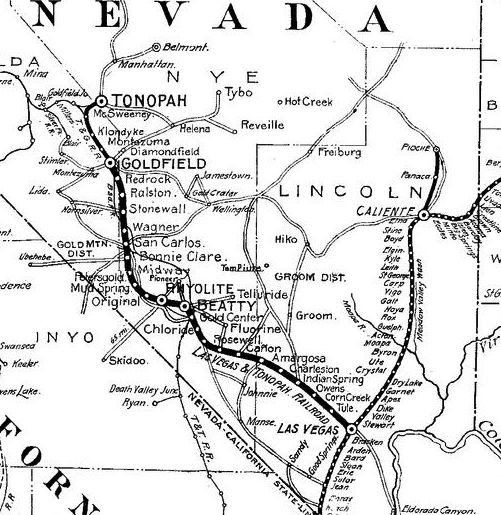

The Las Vegas and Tonopah Railroad was a 197.9-mile (318.5 km) railroad built by William A. Clark that ran northwest from a connection with the mainline of the San Pedro, Los Angeles, and Salt Lake Railroad at Las Vegas, Nevada to the gold mines at Goldfield. The SPLA&SL railroad later became part of the Union Pacific Railroad and serves as their mainline between Los Angeles and Salt Lake City.

== History ==
In April 1905, Clark made a verbal agreement with Francis Marion Smith that Smith could build a rail line to his borax operations at Lila C connecting with the San Pedro, Los Angeles and Salt Lake Railroad at Las Vegas. After Smith's men had already graded 12 miles (19 km) for tracks, his workers received a no-trespassing order that they were not allowed to connect with Clark's rail. Clark had apparently changed his mind, and subsequently, he laid his own rail on the line graded by Smith's men. In response, Smith started his own competing railroad, the Tonopah and Tidewater to the Goldfield boomtowns in direct competition with Clark.

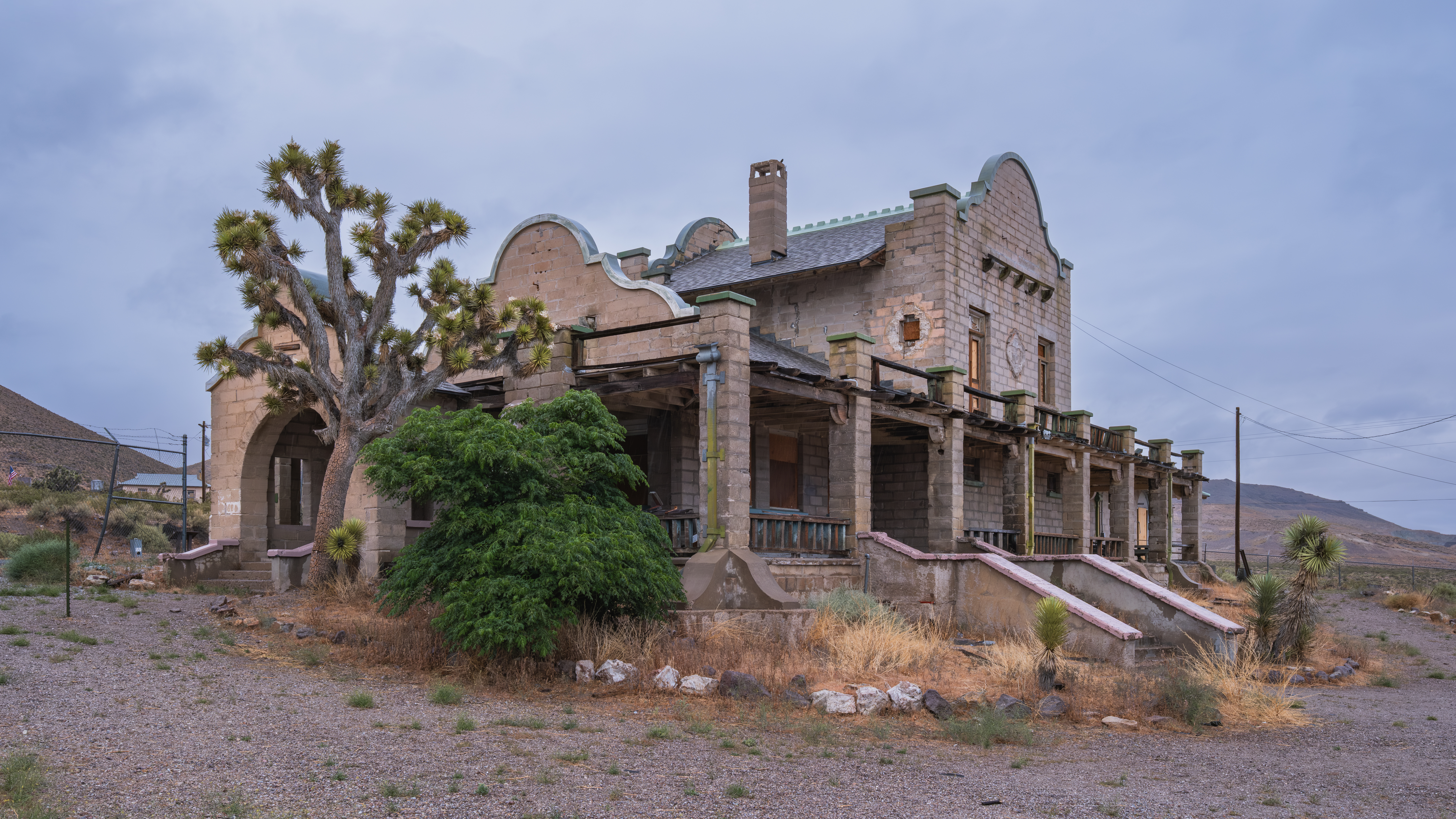
Rhyolite railroad station (April 2026)

The Las Vegas and Tonopah Railroad was incorporated on September 22, 1905. On March 1, 1906, the track was completed between Las Vegas and Indian Springs. By June 30, 1906, the line was over 50% completed (100 miles or 160 kilometres), reaching Rose's Well. In December 1906 the tracks reached Rhyolite. Finally, in November 1907 the entire 198-mile (319 km) line was in operation between Las Vegas and Goldfield.

The northern end of the line (Beatty to Goldfield) was only in operation from 1908 to 1914. That 80 miles (130 km) of track was removed during World War I. The Las Vegas and Tonopah continued to serve the Bullfrog Mining District at Beatty until 1917/1918. By 1919, the remaining 110 miles (180 km) of track was abandoned and scrapped.

== Operations ==
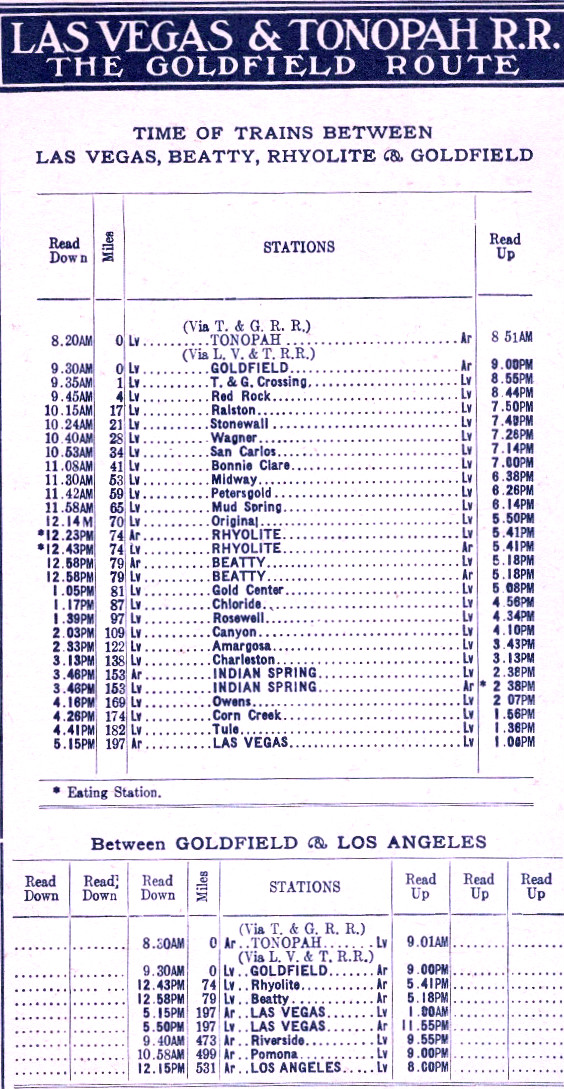
1910 train schedule.

In 1906 the 118-mile (190 km) trip from Las Vegas to Beatty took 6 hours. Trains operated daily until February 1, 1917, and then became tri-weekly until abandonment.

The LV&T depot at Rhyolite still remains. It was constructed in 1909 at a cost of $130,000 (equivalent to $1,075,000 in 2025).

== Locomotives ==
The railroad primarily used "Ten Wheeler" 4-6-0 and Consolidation (2-8-0) type locomotives, primarily manufactured by Brooks and Baldwin Locomotive Works. The railroad's first four locomotives were purchased in used condition. The railroad would later purchase 12 additional new locomotives. Upon abandonment of the railroad in 1917/1918, these locomotives were sold to the Northwestern Pacific Railroad, the Los Angeles and Salt Lake Railroad, and the San Diego and Arizona Railway.

When the LV&T merged with the Bullfrog Goldfield Railroad in 1914, it also acquired its 6 steam locomotives, involving two 0-6-0 switcher locomotives, two 4-6-0 passenger locomotives, and two 2-8-0 freight locomotives.

Number	Type	Builder	SN	Built	Disposition	Notes
1	4-6-0	Baldwin Locomotive Works	11867	5/1891	Sold in 1920 to Outer Harbor Terminal Railway #2	Purchased from Los Angeles & Salt Lake #50 in 1906.
2	4-6-0	Baldwin Locomotive Works	12204	9/1891	Sold in 1909 to Nevada Copper Belt #1	Purchased from Los Angeles & Salt Lake #51 in 1906.
3	0-6-0	Baldwin Locomotive Works	29712	11/1906	Sold in 1910 to Ludlow & Southern #3	Purchased from Bullfrog Goldfield #3 in 1907.
4	4-6-0	Baldwin Locomotive Works	30105	2/1907	Sold in 1918 to Northwestern Pacific #170	
5	4-6-0	Baldwin Locomotive Works	30106	2/1907	Sold in 1918 to Northwestern Pacific #171	
6	4-6-0	Baldwin Locomotive Works	30107	2/1907	Stored after abandonment, sold in 1931 to Six Companies #7107	
7	4-6-0	Baldwin Locomotive Works	31093	6/1907	Sold in 1917 to San Diego & Arizona #24	
8	4-6-0	Baldwin Locomotive Works	31094	6/1907	Sold in 1918 to Northwestern Pacific #172	
9	4-6-0	Baldwin Locomotive Works	32250	11/1907	Sold in 1917 to San Diego & Arizona #25	
10	4-6-0	Baldwin Locomotive Works	32251	11/1907	Sold in 1917 to San Diego & Arizona #26	
11	4-6-0	Baldwin Locomotive Works	32260	12/1907	Sold in 1917 to San Diego & Arizona #27	
12	4-6-0	Alco Schenectady	44753	1907	Sold in 1918 to Northwestern Pacific #179	
30	2-8-0	Alco Brooks	44750	1907	Sold in 1918 to Los Angeles & Salt Lake #3675	
31	2-8-0	Alco Brooks	44751	1907	Sold in 1918 to Los Angeles & Salt Lake #3676	
32	2-8-0	Alco Brooks	44752	1907	Sold in 1918 to Los Angeles & Salt Lake #3677	

== Preservation ==
The Los Angeles Live Steamers group owned an old wooden passenger car which they had named "Tonopah" and labeled it as an ex-Las Vegas & Tonopah car. However, it has been confirmed it was actually from the Tonopah & Tidewater Railroad, and never actually worked on the LV&T.

== Route ==
- Las Vegas (MP 0.0)
- Tule
- Corn Creek
- Owens
- Indian Springs (MP 43.0)
- Charleston, possibly named after nearby Mount Charleston, 4th highest peak in Nevada.
- Amargosa (MP 74.0)
- Cañon
- Rosewell (Rose's Well) (MP 100.0)
- Chloride
- Beatty MP (118.4)
- Rhyolite (MP 123.4), with spur to Montgomery-Shoshone Mine.
- Original
- Mud Springs
- Midway
- Bonnie Claire
- Wagner
- Stonewall
- Ralston, possibly named after Ralston Valley.
- Red Rock
- Milltown
- Columbia
- Goldfield (MP 196.9)

== See also ==
- Bullfrog Goldfield Railroad
- Tonopah and Goldfield Railroad
- Tonopah and Tidewater Railroad
- List of defunct Nevada railroads
