= Nevada Public Radio =

Public radio organization in Nevada

- Logo of Nevada Public Radio

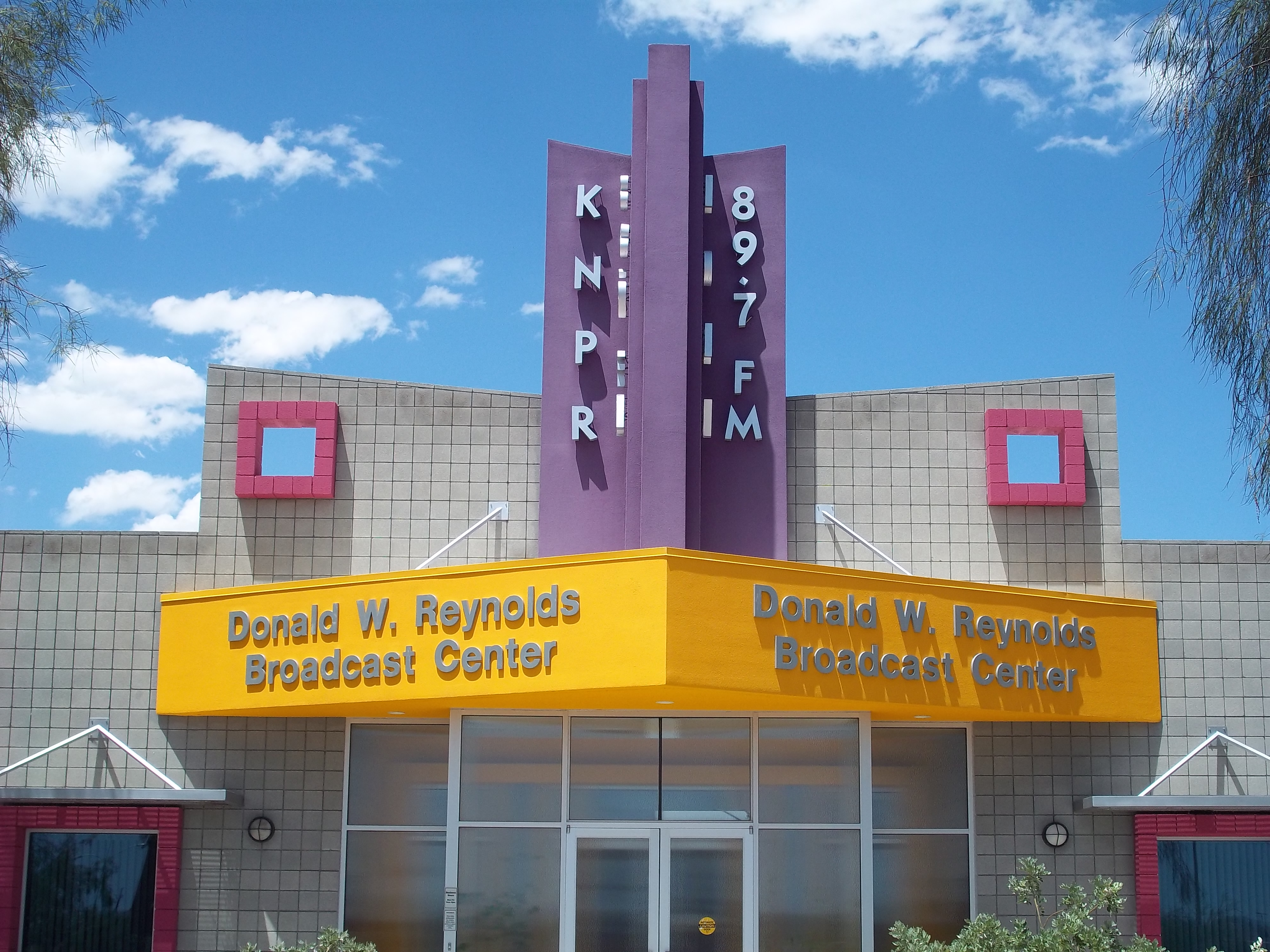
- Donald W. Reynolds Broadcast Center
- Type: Public Radio
- Country: United States
- Headquarters: 1289 S. Torrey Pines Dr. Donald W. Reynolds Broadcast Center; College of Southern Nevada; Las Vegas, NV 89146

Programming
- Affiliations: American Public Media, BBC World Service, National Public Radio

Ownership
- Key people: Favian Perez, CEO; Heidi Kyser, Managing Editor; Joe Schoenmann, Sr. Producer

History
- Founded: March 24, 1980 by Lamar Marchese

Coverage
- Availability: Nevada, E. California, NW Arizona, SW Utah, and worldwide (online
- Stations: KNPR Las Vegas (88.9); KCNV Las Vegas (89.7); KTPH Tonopah (91.7); KLNR Panaca (91.7); KWPR Lund/Ely (88.7); KLKR Elko (89.3); KVNV Reno (89.1)
- Transmitters: K219LM 91.7 FM Havasu City; K201AD 88.1 FM China Lake; K219AV 91.7 FM Beatty; K208BB 89.5 FM Laughlin; K201HX 88.1 FM Mesquite; K210ET 89.9 FM Moapa; K207CY 89.3 FM Round Mountain; K201BF 88.1 FM Scotty's Junction

Links
- Webcast: Listen live
- Website: knpr.org

Nevada Public Radio (NPR) is a non-profit, listener-supported public radio network located in Las Vegas and serves all of Nevada. The network consists three stations, KNPR News (88.9 FM) and KCNV Classical (89.7 FM) both out of Las Vegas and KVNV (89.1 FM) out of Reno along with four additional simulcast stations and 11 translators. The network airs digitally online, through apps, and through HD Radio. It also publishes a city-regional magazine, Desert Companion, primarily focused on Clark County and the desert southwest, circulating 25,000 copies a month.

Nevada Public Radio was the state's first NPR member station, founded in 1975 as an organization with its first broadcast in 1980. In addition to national and international programming from NPR, American Public Media, the Public Radio Exchange and the BBC, its studios produce original, local programming such as the current-events State of Nevada program and Desert Blooms, a weekly gardening program.

Beginning as a grass-roots, husband and wife operation based on the property of Sam Boyd Stadium, it now broadcasts from the Donald W. Reynolds Broadcast Center on the West Charleston campus of the College of Southern Nevada.

== History ==
=== Beginning to 2003 ===
In 1972, when Lamar Marchese, and his wife Patricia, moved to Las Vegas to work for local government, there was no public radio in Nevada. While Marchese worked for the Clark County Library District and Patricia worked for the city of Las Vegas Cultural Affairs Department, the couple planned out the concept for Nevada Public Radio.

The logo for the news station, 88.9 KNPR Las Vegas

In December 1975, Marchese became one of the founding incorporators of the Nevada Public Radio Corporation, a nonprofit organization to raise funds and community awareness to create a local NPR member station.

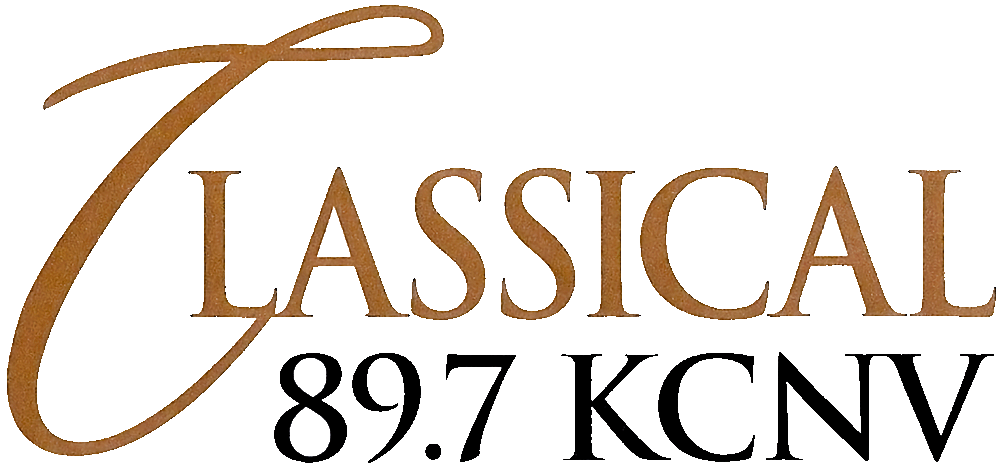
Logo for the classical music station, 88.7 KCNV.

KNPR was the first NPR member station in Nevada. Although KUNR in Reno signed on in 1963, it did not become a member of National Public Radio until 1981, a year after KNPR.

The flagship station is KNPR, which signed on to 89.5 Mhz at 7,500 watts on March 24, 1980; 46 years ago. Marchese was the station's first general manager. The station's original studio was 800 square feet (74 m^{2}) of repurposed janitorial storage in Silver Bowl Stadium. Casino magnate Bill Boyd personally signed a $200,000 loan for the construction of studios for the new station, which moved into its new studio built on the stadium's property.

In 1997, the network moved into the newly-built Donald W. Reynolds Broadcast Center on the West Charleston campus of the College of Southern Nevada, funded through a donation from Reynolds Foundation, after whom the building is named.

During the late 1980s and 1990s, Nevada Public Radio expanded its reach beyond the Las Vegas Valley. The organization began to expand aggressively to extend public radio service to rural Nevada and adjacent states. It established a network of full-power repeater stations, including in Tonopah (KTPH 91.7 FM), Panaca (KLNR 91.7 FM), Lund/Ely (KWPR 88.7 FM), and Elko (KLKR 89.3 FM).

=== Station split ===
By the early 2000s, Nevada Public Radio, along with a trend among public radio stations across the country along with listener preferences, split its news and talk programming from its classical music programming among two separate radio frequencies.

In response to those national trends Nevada public radio split into stations broadcasting from the same studio. On October 31, 2003, news and talk programming moved to 88.9 MHz while classical music moved to a new sister station, KCNV at 89.7 MHz. This followed six years of waiting for the FCC to approve the licensing applications.

=== 2003 to present ===
In 2004, the network joined a one-year agreement with KLAS-TV (Channel 8), the local CBS-affiliate, to co-produce local news. Their two websites were linked, and both covered the local, state, and 2004 U.S. presidential election. Then vice president of KLAS Bob Stoldal explained the move, saying, "It provides another outlet for 'Channel 8 Eyewitness News' and helps KNPR with local news content that it otherwise could not afford to produce itself." The agreement was not renewed.

In 2020, the network's senior producer and State of Nevada host Joe Schoenmann pioneered a new genre for radio—the extraterrestrial radio drama. Shoenmann directed Nevada Public Radio's first radio play, Live from Area 51!, a play which aired on November 25. Featuring the Las Vegas Philharmonic, it recounts a story in which Shoenmann is the first-ever visitor granted access to nearby Area 51.

In 2021, Shoenmann followed up the previous drama with the production of Beneath Area 51!, on October 26. In that radio drama, he and "Crazy Tom," a former physicist, meet an alien. The November 2020 broadcast was among the station's highest-rated show for the year.

== Programming ==
=== Syndicated programming ===
KNPR 88.9 FM primarily airs programs from NPR and other public radio networks, announced with news updates from the station's Briana Joseph. The weekday schedule includes Morning Edition, All Things Considered, Fresh Air, The Daily (The New York Times), Here and Now, 1A, The World, On Point, and Marketplace. The BBC World Service runs the overnight hours.

On weekends and weekday evenings, KNPR features one-hour specialty shows from various public radio networks, including Weekend Edition, This American Life, Reveal, How I Built This, Hidden Brain, Sound Opinions, The Moth Radio Hour, Snap Judgment, Latino USA, Radiolab, and Wait, Wait, Don't Tell Me.

=== Original programming ===
State of Nevada (SoN) is a weekday, hour-long, live broadcast topical news show hosted by Joe Schoenmann. Each hour long episode is typically themed regarding a current event issue in southern Nevada. Depending on the topic, the host either has experts, community leaders, or community members as guests. The show also takes callers to allow real-time conversation with listeners or gives them the chance to ask questions. Episodes cover topics from politics and government, business, arts and entertainment, and practical how-to's. The show first aired along with the network's KNPR/KCNV split in 2003, and was first hosted by regional journalist Gwen Castaldi until she retired in 2005.

Desert Bloom is a weekly gardening show currently hosted by Angela O'Callaghan, social horticulture specialist at the University of Nevada, Reno extension and retired professor Norm Shilling.

=== KCNV ===
KCNV 89.7 FM has a 24-hour classical music format, featuring nationally syndicated performances from organizations like the Chicago Symphony Orchestra and the New York Philharmonic. Specialty programs such as NPR's From the Top, showcasing young classical musicians, and Pipedreams, focused on organ music, are also part of the lineup. Weekend shows like Sunday Baroque, a program of Baroque-era music, also air.

== Desert Companion magazine ==
Desert Companion is a city-regional magazine which originated from KNPR's annual print publication, the Fall Cultural Guide. It was established as a standalone publication in 2007. Initially released quarterly, the magazine switched to a monthly format in 2011. The magazine focuses on service journalism, and covers topics such as culture, lifestyle, and community profiles in Southern Nevada. Each year, the magazine hosts the "Focus on Nevada" photo contest with awards given in these categories: artistic and abstract, city scenes, storyteller, the rurals, wild Nevada, light and shadow. A grand prize award is also given out. The awardees are judged by a panel of staff at the magazine, along with local artists and photographers. Typically, the grand prize comes with a gift of camera equipment from the local, partnering B&C Camera shop.

== Leadership ==
Founder Lamar Marchese served as the general manager from 1980 until 2007. Under his direction, the network grew from just five employees in 1980 to a major broadcast media outlet for Nevada and parts of the neighboring Mountain West.

Flo Rogers took over as CEO from Marchese, having first joined the network in 2001 as the director of programming. Rogers took over in 2007 and during her tenure established the Desert Companion magazine and the acquisition of the former community radio station She led the organization until 2019, when Rogers resigned amid financial difficulties.

Jerry Nadal, a former board chairman, stepped in as interim CEO and helped stabilize the station's finances.

In 2022, Mark Vogelzang was appointed as President and CEO with experience working at other public radio stations. Following Vogelzang's retirement in 2023, Favian Perez, who had been with the organization for ten years, was named Interim CEO and later became the permanent head of the organization.

== Broadcasting ==
Nevada Public Radio operates a network of seven simulcast FM radio stations and nine translators.

Nevada Public Radio broadcasting infrastructure
Stations				Translators			
Call sign	Frequency	City of license	FID	Call Sign	Frequency	City of License	FID
KNPR	88.9 FM	Las Vegas	79047	K219LM	91.7 FM	Lake Havasu City, AZ	48355
KLKR	89.3 FM	Elko	174342	K201AD	88.1 FM	China Lake	49874
KWPR	88.7 FM	Lund/Ely	90472	K219AV	91.7 FM	Beatty, NV	49873
KLNR	91.7 FM	Panaca	48350	K208BB	89.5 FM	Laughlin, NV	48353
KVNV	89.1 FM	Sun Valley/Reno	172600	K201HX	88.1 FM	Mesquite, NV	48357
KTPH	91.7 FM	Tonopah	48356	K210ET	89.9 FM	Moapa, NV	48352
Source: Nevada Public Radio				K207CY	89.3 FM	Round Mountain, NV	92879
Source: Nevada Public Radio				K201BF	88.1 FM	Scotty's Junction, NV	49874
