= KLGU (FM) =

K-Love radio station in St. George, Utah

- St. George, Utah; United States
- Frequency: 90.3 MHz (HD Radio)
- Branding: K-LOVE

Programming
- Format: Contemporary Christian music
- Network: K-Love

Ownership
- Owner: Educational Media Foundation

History
- First air date: November 1, 2005
- Former call signs: KZBS (2004–2005); KSGU (2005–2020)

Technical information
- Licensing authority: FCC
- Facility ID: 122306
- Class: C2
- ERP: 2,000 watts
- HAAT: 555 meters (1,821 ft)
- Transmitter coordinates: 36°50′49″N 113°29′28″W

Links
- Public license information: Public file; LMS

KLGU (90.3 FM) is a radio station located in Saint George, Utah, and is a part of the K-Love network. The station broadcasts a Contemporary Christian music format, broadcasting with a 2,000-watt transmitter. The station services southwest Utah, western Arizona and adjoining areas of Clark County and Lincoln County, Nevada.

== History ==
The station was assigned the call letters KZBS on 2004-03-29. On 2005-07-01, the station changed its call sign to KSGU. On November 1, 2005, KSGU became the sixth station in the Nevada Public Radio family, simulcasting KNPR in Las Vegas.

In April 2020, Nevada Public Radio sold KSGU to the Educational Media Foundation for $382,000; EMF's lone presence in the city was a translator prior to the sale. The call letters were changed to KLGU on June 11, 2020, coincident with the consummation of the sale, and the station began broadcasting K-Love, which had previously aired on the translator. Public radio service continued to St. George through repeaters for KUER-FM and Utah Public Radio.
