= Nye County, Nevada =

County in Nevada, United States

- County
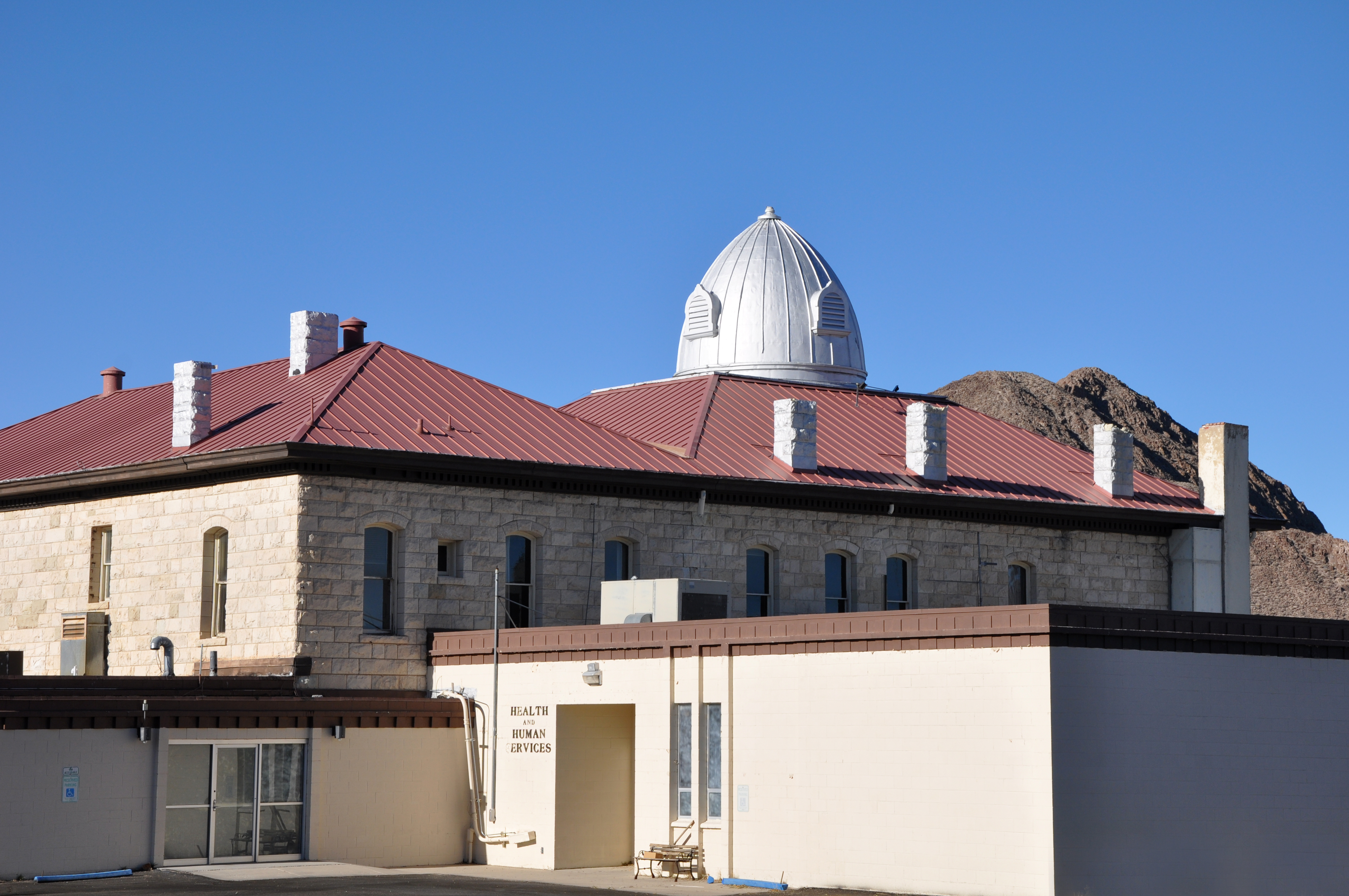
- Nye County Courthouse in Tonopah

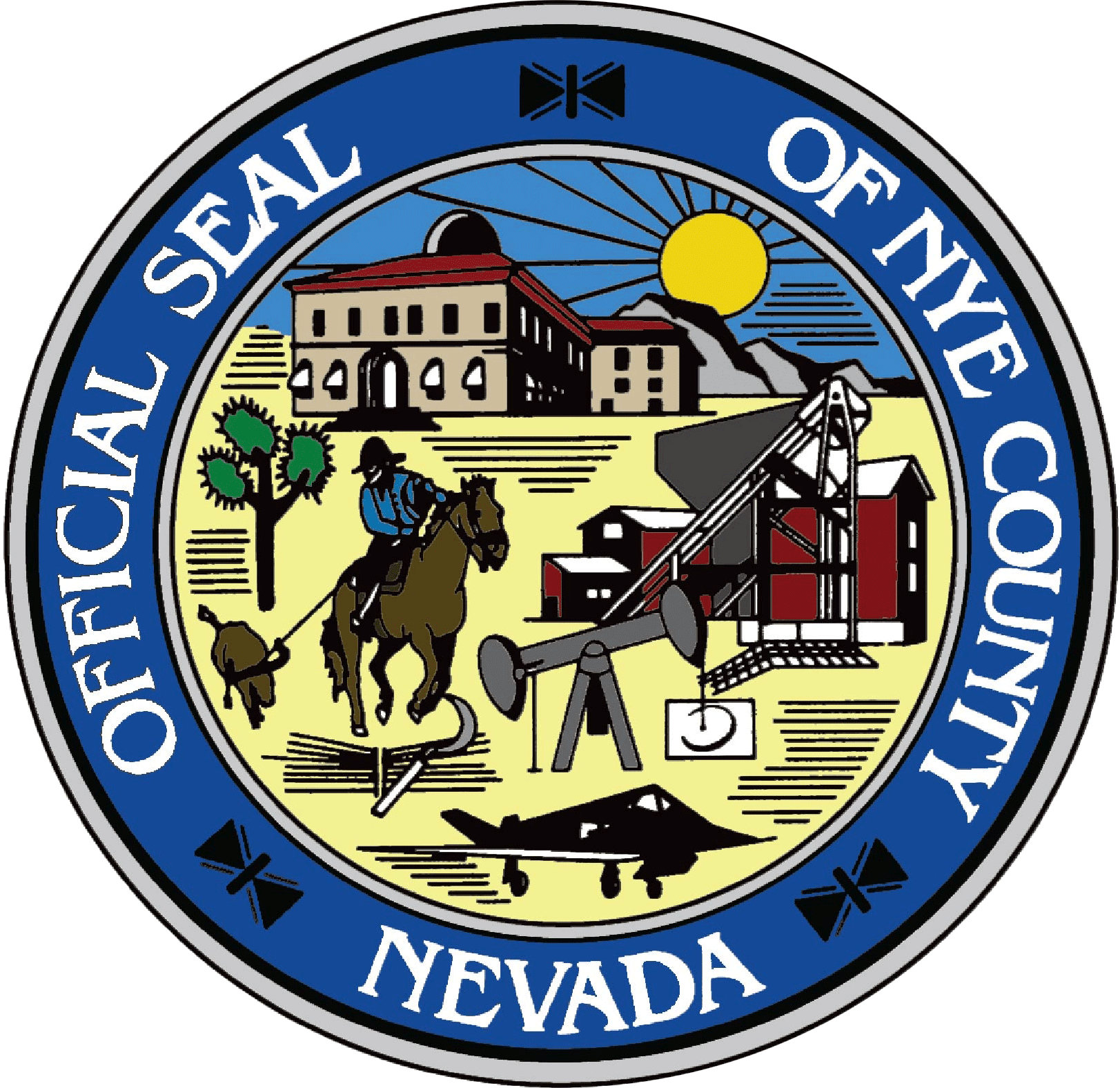
- Flag Seal

- Location within the U.S. state of Nevada
- Coordinates: 38°03′N 116°27′W
- Country: United States
- State: Nevada
- Founded: 1864; 162 years ago
- Named for: James W. Nye
- Seat: Tonopah
- Largest community: Pahrump

Area
  - Total: 18,199 sq mi (47,140 km^{2})
  - Land: 18,182 sq mi (47,090 km^{2})
  - Water: 17 sq mi (44 km^{2}) 0.1%

Population (2020)
  - Total: 51,591
  - Estimate (2025): 57,336 ▲
  - Density: 2.8375/sq mi (1.0956/km^{2})
- Time zone: UTC−8 (Pacific)
  - Summer (DST): UTC−7 (PDT)
- Congressional district: 4th
- Website: www.nyecountynv.gov

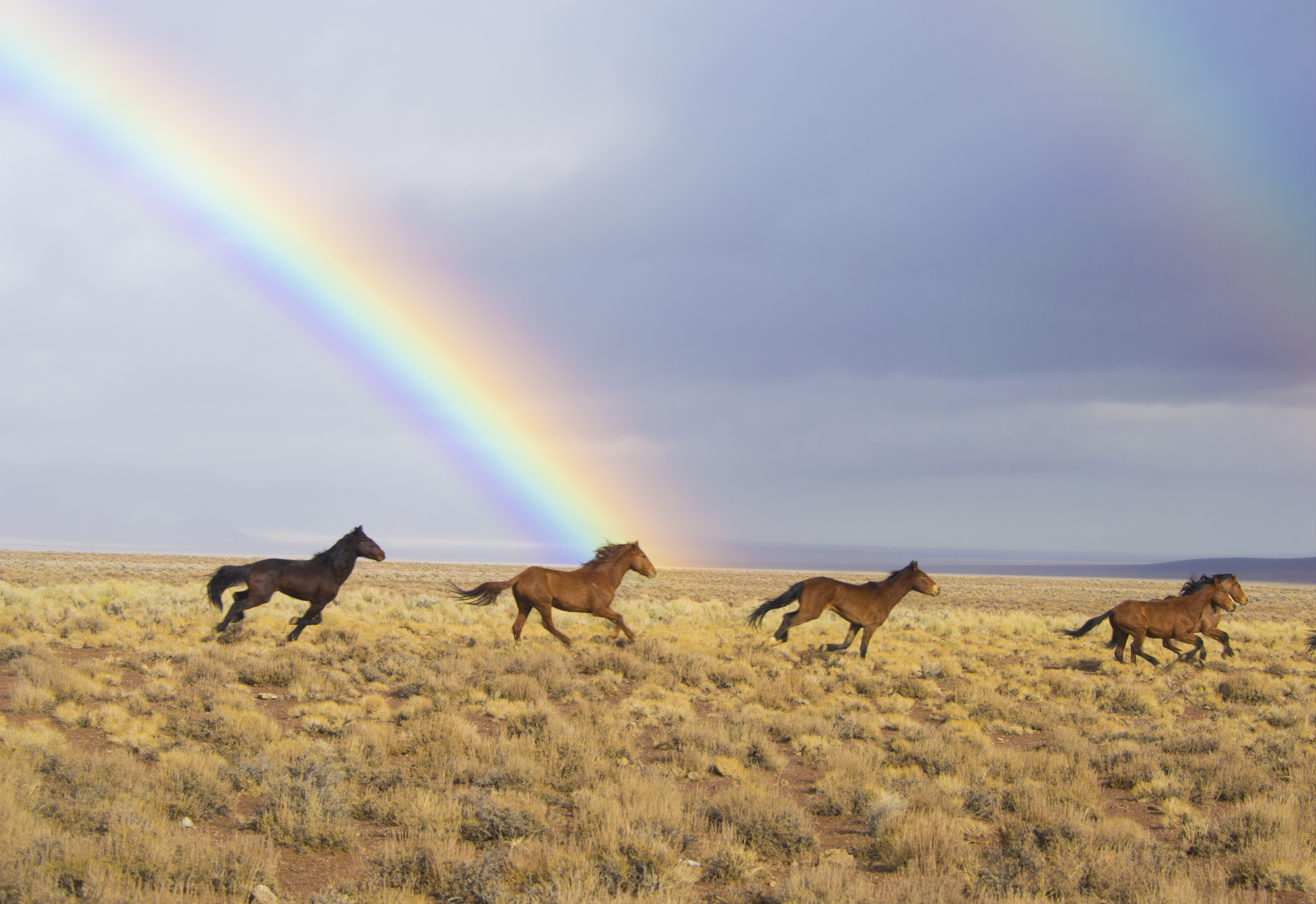
2017 Reveille Wild Horse Release by BLM, about 50 miles east of Tonopah and 12 miles south of Warm Springs, Nevada

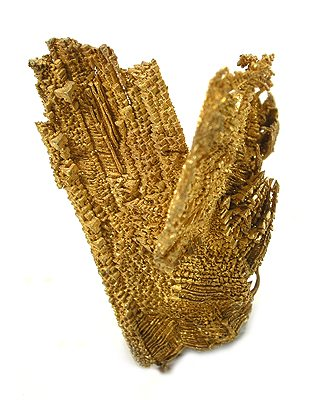
Gold specimen from the Round Mountain Gold Mine

Nye County is a county in the U.S. state of Nevada. As of the 2020 census, the population was 51,591. Its county seat is Tonopah. At 18,159 square miles (47,030 km^{2}), Nye is Nevada's largest county by area and the third-largest county in the contiguous United States, behind San Bernardino County, California and Coconino County, Arizona.

Nye County includes the Pahrump micropolitan statistical area, which is also included in the Las Vegas-Henderson combined statistical area.

In 2010, Nevada's center of population was in southern Nye County, near Yucca Mountain.

The Nevada Test Site and proposed Yucca Mountain nuclear waste repository are in southwestern Nye County, and are the focus of a great deal of controversy. The federal government manages 92% of the county's land. A 1987 attempt to stop the nuclear waste site resulted in the creation of Bullfrog County, Nevada, which was dissolved two years later.

The county has several environmentally sensitive areas, including Ash Meadows National Wildlife Refuge, the White River Valley, several Great Basin sky islands, and part of Death Valley National Park. Visitors to Death Valley often stay at Beatty or Amargosa Valley.

Nye County is one of 10 Nevada counties where prostitution is legal. The county has no incorporated cities. The seat of government in Tonopah is 160 miles (260 km) from Pahrump, where about 86% of the county's population resides.

== History ==
Nye County was established during the American Civil War in 1864 and named after James W. Nye, the first governor of the Nevada Territory and later a U.S. Senator after it was admitted as a state. The first county seat was Ione in 1864, followed by Belmont in 1867, and finally Tonopah in 1905.

The county's first boom came in the early 20th century, when Rhyolite and Tonopah, as well as Goldfield in nearby Esmeralda County, had gold- and silver-mining booms. Goldfield reached a peak population of around 20,000 people in 1906 and hosted a lightweight boxing championship match between Joe Gans and Oscar "Battling" Nelson. Goldfield briefly became Nevada's largest city. Tonopah and Rhyolite also experienced a population boom. These cities were linked by the Tonopah and Tidewater Railroad.

After the boom died, Nye County withered. By 1910, the population had plummeted to about 7,500 before sinking to near 3,000 in the middle of the century. With development at the military test site and increasing employment and resources, the population stabilized. After the 1990s, when Pahrump became a bedroom community for Las Vegas, it had high rates of population growth.

Periodically, discussions have arisen of moving the county seat to Pahrump, or splitting off the southern portion of the county, but neither of these ideas appears to have sufficient support in the county or state government.

From 1987 to 1989, Bullfrog County, Nevada, was split off from Nye County to form a separate political region. Its population was zero; its creation was an attempt to stop a nuclear waste storage facility from being built in the region.

== Geography ==
According to the U.S. Census Bureau, the county has an area of 18,199 square miles (47,140 km^{2}), of which 18,182 square miles (47,090 km^{2}) is land and 17 square miles (44 km^{2}) (0.09%) is water. The highest and most topographically prominent mountain in the county is Mount Jefferson at 11,949 feet (3,642 m).

Nye County is in south-central Nevada. It is Nevada's largest county and the third-largest county in the contiguous United States, after San Bernardino County in California and Coconino County in Arizona. Nye County's land area of 11,560,960 acres (46,785.5 km^{2}) is larger than that of Maryland, Hawaii, Vermont, and New Hampshire, and larger than the combined area of Massachusetts, Rhode Island, New Jersey, and Delaware. Of this vast land area, only 822,711 acres (3,329.39 km^{2}), or just over 7%, is private land; most of it is public land managed by the federal government. Before the Treaty of Ruby Valley, the whole area was controlled by the Western Shoshone people, who say they never ceded territory here. According to the United States Census Bureau the county's Census Tract 9805, with a land area of 4,225.415 square miles (10,943.77 km^{2}), comprising the Nevada Test Site and Nye County's portion of the Nevada Test and Training Range, is the country's largest census tract that has no resident population (as of the 2000 census).

Las Vegas, in Clark County, is 100 miles (160 km) southeast of Yucca Mountain. Many Pahrump residents commute 60 miles (97 km) each way to Las Vegas via Nevada State Route 160, which for much of its length is a four-lane divided highway.

=== Adjacent counties ===
- Churchill County - northwest
- Lander County - north
- Eureka County - north
- White Pine County - northeast
- Lincoln County - east
- Clark County - southeast
- Esmeralda County - west
- Mineral County - west
- Inyo County, California - south

=== National protected areas ===
- Ash Meadows National Wildlife Refuge
- Death Valley National Park (part)
- Humboldt-Toiyabe National Forest (part)
- Spring Mountains National Recreation Area (part)

== Transportation ==
=== Public transit ===
In 2018, Nye county launched its own transit service for the town of Pahrump named Pahrump Valley Public Transportation. In 2023, Pahrump Valley Public Transportation launch demand response service to Beatty and Amargosa Valley

For Senior Transportation/Paratransit transportation services is directly provided by Nye County Transportation Services department

=== Major highways ===
Nye County has a long stretch of U.S. Route 95, the main road connecting Las Vegas with the state capital, Carson City. Beatty and Tonopah both rely heavily on through traffic to sustain their economies. As of 2006, an average of 2,000 cars daily traveled U.S. 95 near Tonopah.

- Interstate 11 (Future)
- U.S. Route 6
- U.S. Route 95
- State Route 160
- State Route 267
- State Route 318
- State Route 361
- State Route 372
- State Route 373
- State Route 374
- State Route 375
- State Route 376
- State Route 377
- State Route 379
- State Route 844

== Demographics ==
Historical population
Census	Pop.	Note	%±
1870	1,087		—
1880	1,875		72.5%
1890	1,290		−31.2%
1900	1,140		−11.6%
1910	7,513		559.0%
1920	6,504		−13.4%
1930	3,989		−38.7%
1940	3,606		−9.6%
1950	3,101		−14.0%
1960	4,374		41.1%
1970	5,599		28.0%
1980	9,048		61.6%
1990	17,781		96.5%
2000	32,485		82.7%
2010	43,946		35.3%
2020	51,591		17.4%
2025 (est.)	57,336	▲	11.1%
U.S. Decennial Census; 1790–1960 1900–1990; 1990-2000 2010–2020

=== Racial and ethnic composition ===
Nye County, Nevada – Racial and ethnic composition Note: the US Census treats Hispanic/Latino as an ethnic category. This table excludes Latinos from the racial categories and assigns them to a separate category. Hispanics/Latinos may be of any race.
Race / Ethnicity (NH = Non-Hispanic)	Pop 1980	Pop 1990	Pop 2000	Pop 2010	Pop 2020	% 1980	% 1990	% 2000	% 2010	% 2020
White alone (NH)	8,071	15,635	27,511	34,663	37,313	89.20%	87.93%	84.69%	78.88%	72.32%
Black or African American alone (NH)	54	274	373	836	1,496	0.60%	1.54%	1.15%	1.90%	2.90%
Native American or Alaska Native alone (NH)	354	475	587	592	620	3.91%	2.67%	1.81%	1.35%	1.20%
Asian alone (NH)	57	148	242	547	1,028	0.63%	0.83%	0.74%	1.24%	1.99%
Native Hawaiian or Pacific Islander alone (NH)	x	x	100	179	217	x	x	0.31%	0.41%	0.42%
Other race alone (NH)	4	12	68	53	291	0.04%	0.07%	0.21%	0.12%	0.56%
Mixed race or Multiracial (NH)	x	x	891	1,109	2,699	x	x	2.74%	2.52%	5.23%
Hispanic or Latino (any race)	508	1,237	2,713	5,967	7,927	5.61%	6.96%	8.35%	13.58%	15.37%
Total	9,048	17,781	32,485	43,946	51,591	100.00%	100.00%	100.00%	100.00%	100.00%

=== 2020 census ===
As of the 2020 census, the county had a population of 51,591. The median age was 53.6 years. 16.5% of residents were under the age of 18 and 31.1% of residents were 65 years of age or older. For every 100 females there were 105.9 males, and for every 100 females age 18 and over there were 106.0 males age 18 and over. 72.7% of residents lived in urban areas, while 27.3% lived in rural areas.

The racial makeup of the county was 75.9% White, 3.0% Black or African American, 1.6% American Indian and Alaska Native, 2.1% Asian, 0.5% Native Hawaiian and Pacific Islander, 6.4% from some other race, and 10.5% from two or more races. Hispanic or Latino residents of any race comprised 15.4% of the population.

There were 21,763 households in the county, of which 20.5% had children under the age of 18 living with them and 23.6% had a female householder with no spouse or partner present. About 30.7% of all households were made up of individuals and 17.5% had someone living alone who was 65 years of age or older.

There were 25,191 housing units, of which 13.6% were vacant. Among occupied housing units, 74.2% were owner-occupied and 25.8% were renter-occupied. The homeowner vacancy rate was 3.8% and the rental vacancy rate was 9.2%.

=== 2010 census ===
At the 2010 census, there were 43,946 people, 18,032 households, and 11,929 families in the county. The population density was 2.4 inhabitants per square mile (0.93 inhabitants/km^{2}). There were 22,350 housing units at an average density of 1.2 units per square mile (0.46 units/km^{2}). The racial makeup of the county was 85.9% white, 2.0% black or African American, 1.6% American Indian, 1.3% Asian, 0.5% Pacific islander, 5.2% from other races, and 3.5% from two or more races. Those of Hispanic or Latino origin made up 13.6% of the population. In terms of ancestry, 18.6% were German, 15.8% were English, 14.7% were Irish, 10.3% were American, and 6.1% were Italian.

Of the 18,032 households, 25.1% had children under the age of 18 living with them, 51.5% were married couples living together, 9.3% had a female householder with no husband present, 33.8% were non-families, and 26.8% of households were made up of individuals. The average household size was 2.42 and the average family size was 2.90. The median age was 48.4 years.

The median household income was $41,181 and the median family income was $50,218. Males had a median income of $51,574 versus $32,152 for females. The per capita income for the county was $22,687. About 14.2% of families and 18.9% of the population were below the poverty line, including 27.8% of those under age 18 and 9.8% of those age 65 or over.

=== 2000 census ===
At the 2000 census there were 32,485 people, 13,309 households, and 9,063 families in the county. The population density was 2 people per square mile (0.77 people/km^{2}). There were 15,934 housing units at an average density of 1 units per square mile (0.39/km^{2}). The racial makeup of the county was 90.0% White, 1.18% Black or African American, 1.96% Native American, 0.78% Asian, 0.32% Pacific Islander, 2.98% from other races, and 3.15% from two or more races. 8.35%. were Hispanic or Latino of any race.

Of the 13,309 households 16.40% had children under the age of 18 living with them, 26.30% were married couples living together, 7.40% had a female householder with no husband present, and 31.90% were non-families. 25.70% of households were one person and 10.30% were one person aged 65 or older. The average household size was 2.42 and the average family size was 2.90.

The age distribution was 3.70% under the age of 18, 5.40% from 18 to 24, 24.00% from 25 to 44, 58.50% from 45 to 64, and 18.40% 65 or older. The median age was 43 years. For every 100 females there were 105.10 males. For every 100 females age 18 and over, there were 104.70 males.

The county's median household income was $36,024, and the median family income was $41,642. Males had a median income of $37,276 versus $22,394 for females. The county's per capita income was $17,962. About 7.30% of families and 10.70% of the population were below the poverty line, including 13.10% of those under age 18 and 8.30% of those age 65 or over.

Like many rural counties of the western United States, Nye County experiences a relatively high suicide rate. According to the Centers for Disease Control, the annual suicide rate in Nye County averaged 28.7561 per 100,000 people during 1989–1998, the most recent period for which data is available. This was the third-highest rate among Nevada counties, behind White Pine (34.3058) and Lyon County (30.8917), but ahead of the overall rate of 22.96 for Nevada, which leads the nation.

== Education ==
The Nye County School District serves all of Nye County.

High school students in Esmeralda County go to Tonopah High School of Nye County School District.

The county is in the service area of Great Basin College.

== Communities ==
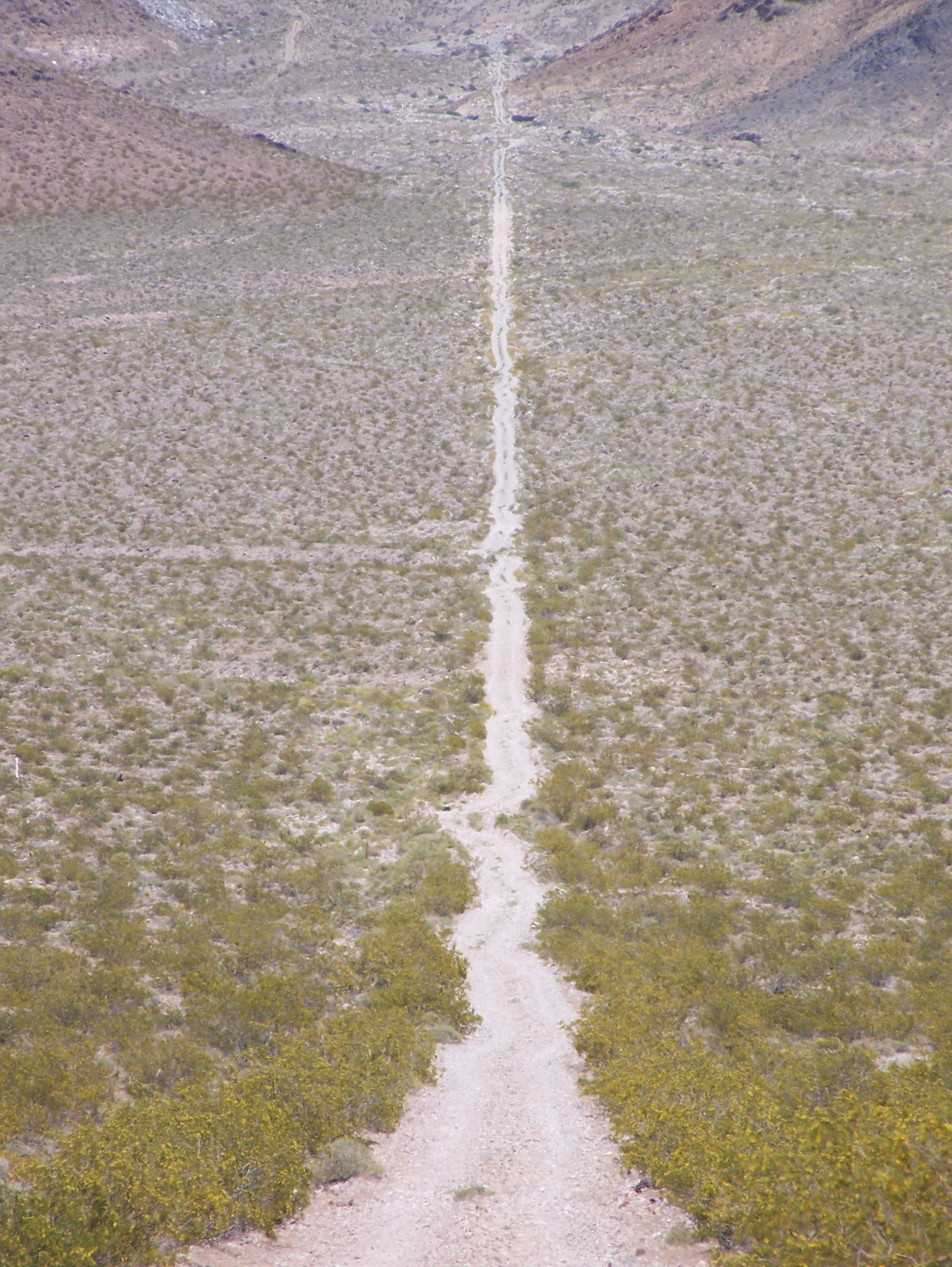
Road from Carrara, Nevada, towards the marble quarry in the background

=== Census-designated places ===
- Amargosa Valley
- Beatty
- Gabbs
- Pahrump
- Tonopah (county seat)
- There are no incorporated places in Nye County.

=== Unincorporated communities ===
- Carvers
- Crystal
- Currant
- Duckwater
- Hadley
- Manhattan
- Mercury
- Round Mountain
- Scotty's Junction
- Sunnyside
- Tybo
- Yomba

=== Ghost towns ===
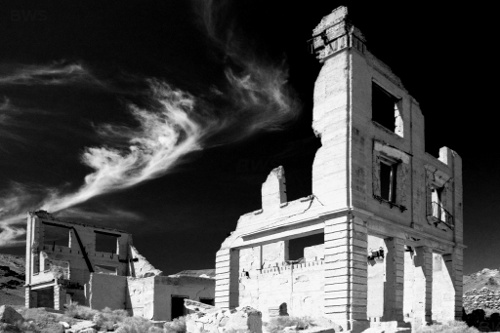
Ruins of the John S. Cook and Company building; occupied in 1908 by the First National Bank, Rhyolite

- Belmont
- Bonnie Claire
- Bullfrog
- Berlin
- Cactus Springs
- Carrara
- Gold Center
- Grantsville
- Ione
- Lockes
- Nyala
- Pioneer
- Potts
- Rhyolite
- Warm Springs

== Politics ==
Nye County, like most rural Nevada counties, is a Republican stronghold. The last Democrat to carry the county was Jimmy Carter in 1976.

United States presidential election results for Nye County, Nevada
Year	Republican		Democratic		Third party(ies)	
Year	No.	%	No.	%	No.	%
1864	115	61.17%	73	38.83%	0	0.00%
1868	353	50.00%	353	50.00%	0	0.00%
1872	339	65.19%	0	0.00%	181	34.81%
1876	429	49.60%	436	50.40%	0	0.00%
1880	339	44.78%	418	55.22%	0	0.00%
1884	207	51.36%	196	48.64%	0	0.00%
1888	137	69.54%	60	30.46%	0	0.00%
1892	14	5.36%	7	2.68%	240	91.95%
1896	12	5.00%	228	95.00%	0	0.00%
1900	32	14.41%	190	85.59%	0	0.00%
1904	511	50.74%	389	38.63%	107	10.63%
1908	1,124	40.53%	1,219	43.96%	430	15.51%
1912	345	14.62%	869	36.84%	1,145	48.54%
1916	1,019	32.15%	1,601	50.50%	550	17.35%
1920	1,576	54.36%	1,007	34.74%	316	10.90%
1924	884	39.69%	454	20.39%	889	39.92%
1928	958	46.04%	1,123	53.96%	0	0.00%
1932	506	28.08%	1,296	71.92%	0	0.00%
1936	464	23.69%	1,495	76.31%	0	0.00%
1940	729	37.67%	1,206	62.33%	0	0.00%
1944	723	43.40%	943	56.60%	0	0.00%
1948	722	51.94%	595	42.81%	73	5.25%
1952	1,037	64.65%	567	35.35%	0	0.00%
1956	946	55.81%	749	44.19%	0	0.00%
1960	763	43.45%	993	56.55%	0	0.00%
1964	822	39.18%	1,276	60.82%	0	0.00%
1968	843	40.70%	728	35.15%	500	24.14%
1972	1,287	61.61%	802	38.39%	0	0.00%
1976	1,027	42.53%	1,261	52.22%	127	5.26%
1980	2,387	64.17%	973	26.16%	360	9.68%
1984	3,573	71.62%	1,269	25.44%	147	2.95%
1988	3,619	64.59%	1,748	31.20%	236	4.21%
1992	2,743	34.19%	2,561	31.92%	2,718	33.88%
1996	3,979	43.20%	3,300	35.83%	1,932	20.97%
2000	6,904	56.68%	4,525	37.15%	752	6.17%
2004	8,487	58.49%	5,616	38.70%	407	2.80%
2008	9,537	54.53%	7,226	41.31%	728	4.16%
2012	10,566	60.30%	6,320	36.07%	636	3.63%
2016	13,324	68.00%	5,094	26.00%	1,177	6.01%
2020	17,528	69.07%	7,288	28.72%	562	2.21%
2024	18,946	70.18%	7,559	28.00%	492	1.82%

United States Senate election results for Nye County, Nevada
Year	Republican		Democratic		Third party(ies)	
Year	No.	%	No.	%	No.	%
2024	17,220	64.15%	7,645	28.48%	1,978	7.37%

== In popular culture ==
Nye County was one of the primary broadcast locations of American veteran radio broadcaster Art Bell, who was famous for creating and hosting Coast to Coast AM, Art Bell's Dark Matter and "Midnight in the Desert", the last of which continued to be broadcast on the Dark Matter Digital Network by Bell's chosen successor, Dave Schrader. Bell lived in the county until his death on April 13, 2018.

== See also ==
- National Register of Historic Places listings in Nye County, Nevada
- South Egan Range Wilderness
- Weepah Spring Wilderness
