= Nevada Copper Belt Railroad =

Defunct horseshoe-route mining railroad (1910–1947)

Overview
- Locale: Lyon County, Nevada
- Dates of operation: 1910–1947

Technical
- Track gauge: 4 ft 8 1/2 in (1,435 mm) standard gauge

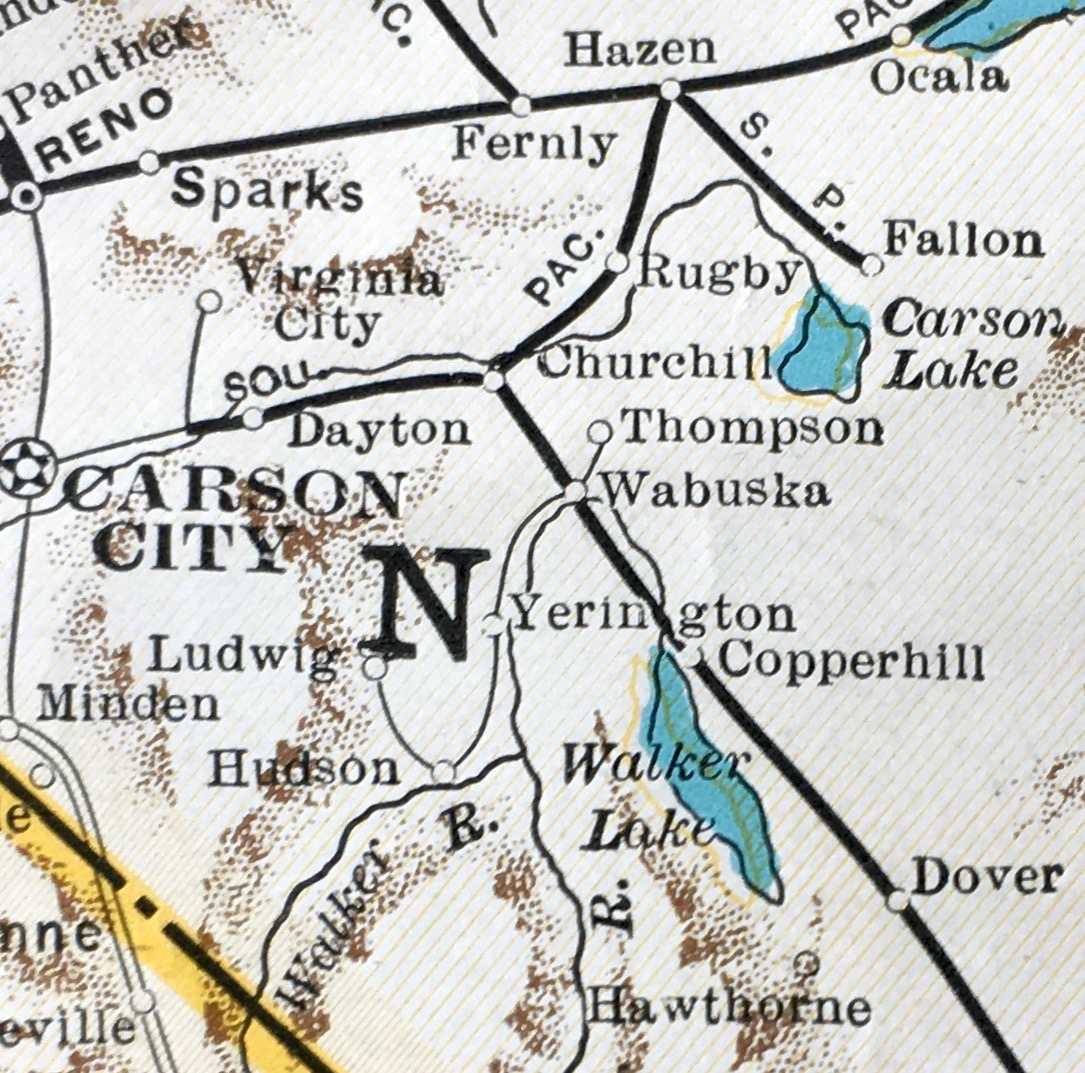
Nevada Copper Belt Railroad 1931

The Nevada Copper Belt Railroad was a railroad in the state of Nevada connecting Nevada-Douglas Copper Company mining facilities to the Southern Pacific's former Carson and Colorado Railway subsidiary at Wabuska, Nevada. The railroad was built south from Wabuska to the Walker River at Mason, Nevada in 1910, and began operations on 1 March. Railroad construction then proceeded up the West Walker River canyon from Mason to leave the river at Hudson reaching the Nevada-Douglas Copper Company mine at Ludwig on 1 November 1911. Rails also extended 2.54 miles (4.09 km) north from Wabuska to a smelter at Thompson. Agricultural products from irrigated ranches along the Walker River provided revenues in addition to the ore traffic.

== Decline ==
The railroad went into receivership in 1925, but traffic volume remained high until the Thompson smelter closed in 1929. The line from Hudson to Ludwig was abandoned when the Standard Gypsum Plaster plant closed in 1932. As trucks began hauling agricultural products, the railroad ceased passenger operations in 1945 and abandoned all operations in 1947.

== Motive power roster ==
Number	Builder	Type	Date	Works number	Notes
1	Baldwin Locomotive Works	4-6-0	1891	12204	built as Los Angeles Terminal Railway #7; purchased 1909; scrapped 1916
2	Lima Locomotive Works	2-8-0	1911	1091	purchased new
3	Baldwin Locomotive Works	2-8-0	1912	37577	purchased new; sold in 1921 as Sierra Railroad #24. Scrapped 1955.
4	Baldwin Locomotive Works	2-8-0			purchased for parts; tender used on locomotive #2
5	ALCO Richmond Locomotive Works	2-8-0	1925	66302	purchased new; sold in 1947 as Virginia and Truckee Railroad 2nd #5. Retired 1950. Used in the films Thundering Rails and Train to Tombstone. Scrapped 1951.
6	Plymouth Locomotive Works	6-wheel Gas-mechanical			purchased used in 1945
20	Fairbanks-Morse	passenger motor			destroyed by accidental fire
21	Hall-Scott	passenger motor	1910	5	wooden 32-passenger body built by W. L. Holman Car Company; preserved at the California State Railroad Museum
22	Hall-Scott	passenger motor	1914	13	steel 25-passenger body built for Salt Lake and Utah Railroad; partially scrapped in 1947. Body at Nevada State Railroad Museum, Carson City, NV
