= Slate Ridge =

Mountain range in Esmeralda County, Nevada, US

- Location within Nevada

Highest point
- Elevation: 1,966 m (6,450 ft)

Geography
- Country: United States
- State: Nevada
- District: Esmeralda County
- Range coordinates: 37°18′14.748″N 117°20′35.271″W
- Topo map: USGS Gold Point

The Slate Ridge is a mountain range in Esmeralda County, Nevada. The elevation of the ridge is 6,450 feet (1,970 m).
