= Nevada State Route 267 =

State highway in Nevada, United States

State Route 267
- Scotty's Castle Road

Route information
- Maintained by NDOT
- Length: 21.427 mi (34.483 km)
- Existed: July 1, 1976–present

Major junctions
- West end: North Highway at the California state line near Scotty's Castle, CA
- East end: Future I-11 / US 95 in Scotty's Junction

Location
- Country: United States
- State: Nevada
- Counties: Esmeralda, Nye

Highway system
- Nevada State Highway System; Interstate; US; State; Pre‑1976; Scenic
| ← SR 266 | → SR 278 |

State Route 267 (SR 267) is a 21.427-mile (34.483 km) state highway in Nevada, United States. Known as Scotty's Castle Road, the highway connects Death Valley National Park to U.S. Route 95. The route was previously designated State Route 72.

== Route description ==
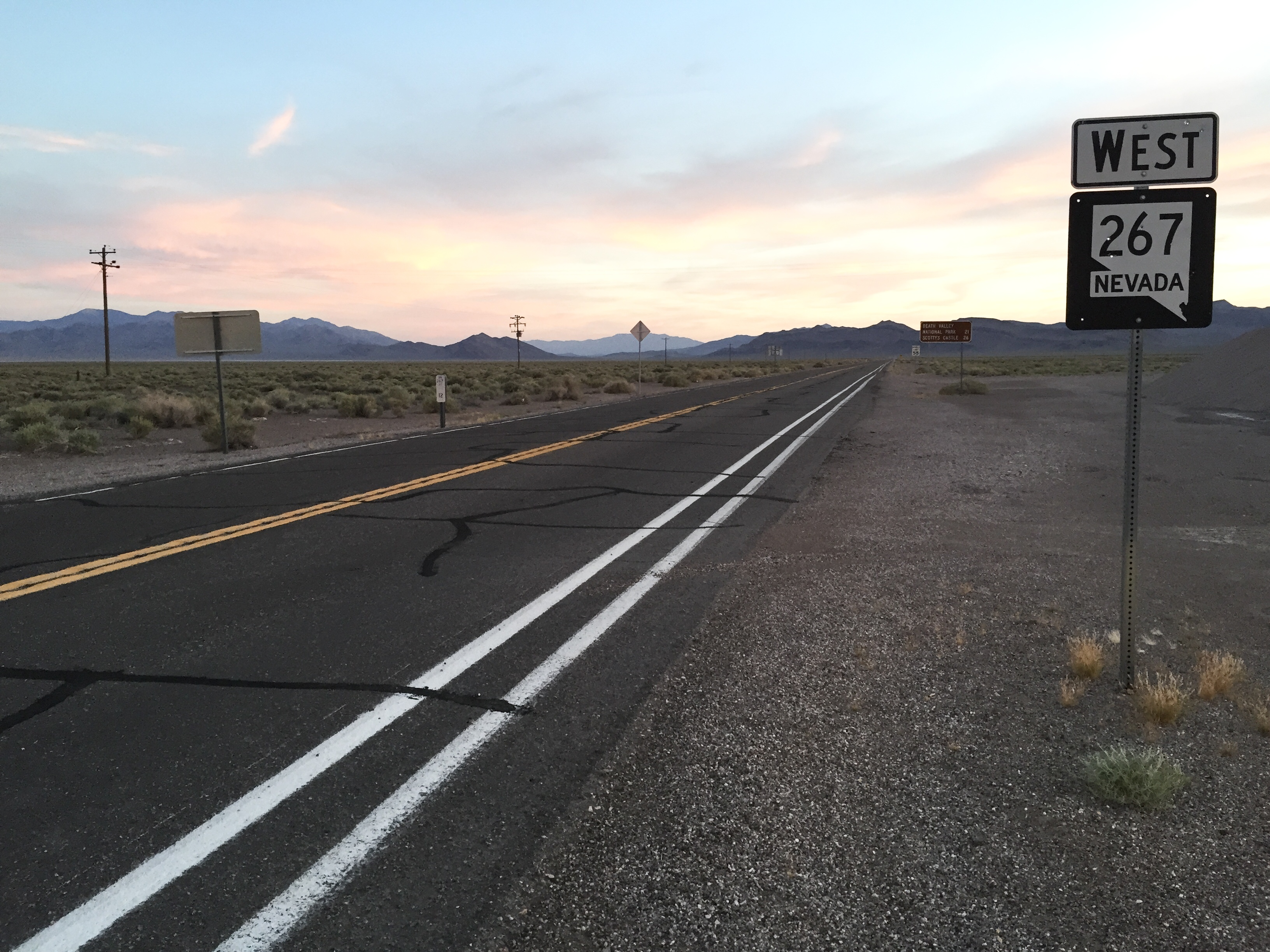
View from the east end of SR 267 looking westbound as seen in 2015

SR 267 is a continuation of Scotty's Castle Road within Death Valley National Park. The route begins just east of Scotty's Castle, at the California–Nevada state line in Esmeralda County. The highway travels northeast from there, entering Nye County as it traverses the desert. SR 267 reaches its northern terminus at Scotty's Junction, an intersection with US 95 approximately 30 miles (48 km) south of Goldfield.

== History ==
SR 267 was previously designated State Route 72

Scotty's Castle Road first appears as an unimproved County road in 1932 edition of the state highway map, connecting State Route 5 (now US 95) to Death Valley via the town of Bonnie Claire. The road was designated State Route 72 by 1942, and had been paved by 1952.

State Route 267 was assigned to former SR 72 on July 1, 1976. This change first appeared on official state maps in 1978.

== Major intersections ==
Note: Mileposts in Nevada reset at county lines; the start and end mileposts for each county are given in the county column.

| County | Location | mi | km | Destinations | Notes |
|---|---|---|---|---|---|
| Esmeralda; 0.00–9.35 | | 0.000 | 0.000 | North Highway – Scotty's Castle | Continuation beyond the California state line; serves Death Valley National Park |
| Nye; 0.00–12.07 | Scotty's Junction | 21.427 | 34.483 | Future I-11 / US 95 – Las Vegas, Tonopah, Reno | Proposed interchange; eastern terminus |
1.000 mi = 1.609 km; 1.000 km = 0.621 mi
