= 1884 United States presidential election in Nevada =

- November 4, 1884
- Turnout: 20.52% of the total population ▼8.94 pp
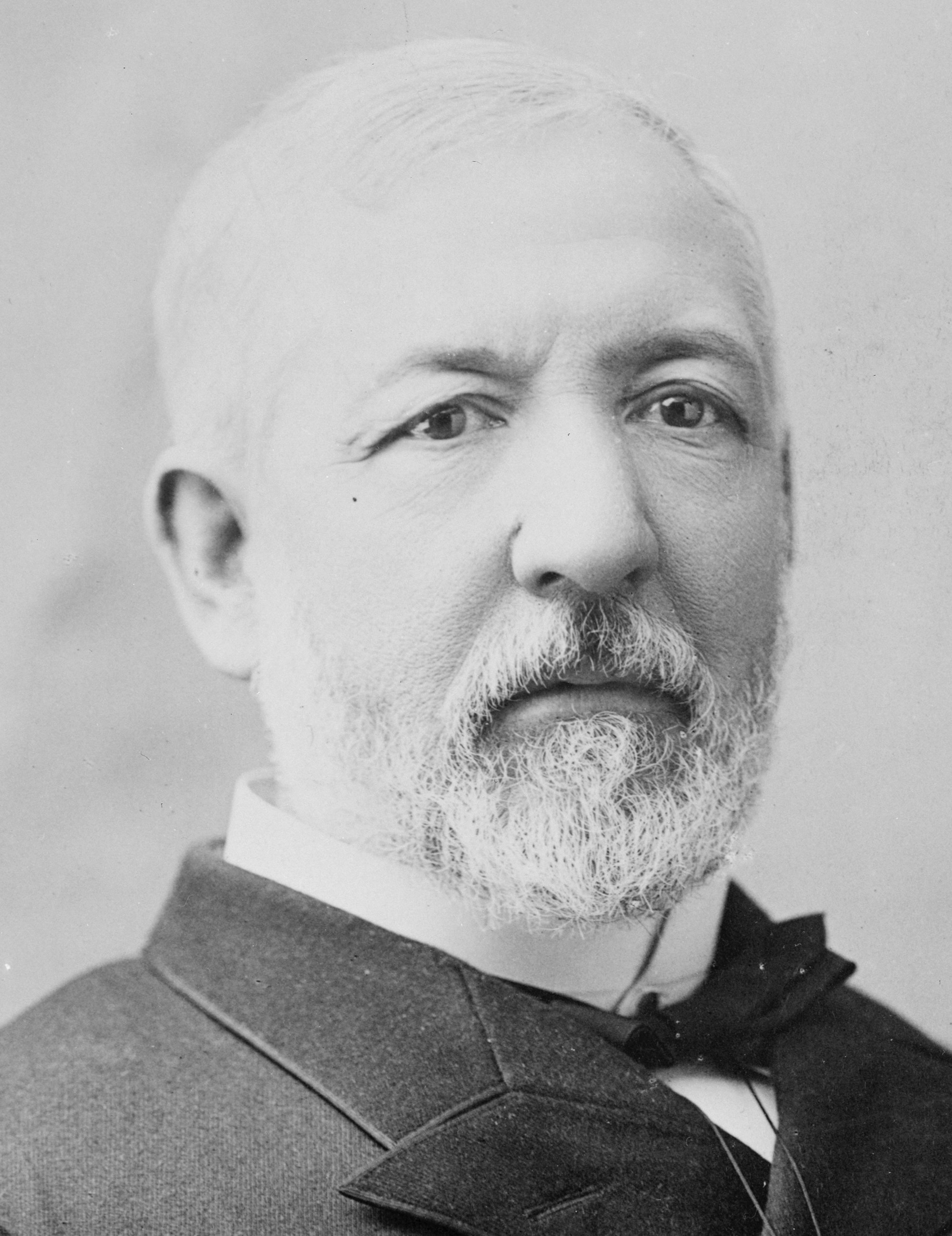

Nominee	James G. Blaine	Grover Cleveland
Party	Republican	Democratic
Home state	Maine	New York
Running mate	John A. Logan	Thomas A. Hendricks
Electoral vote	3	0
Popular vote	7,193	5,578
Percentage	56.21%	43.59%
County results
Blaine
50–60%
60–70%
Cleveland
50–60%
President before election
Chester A. Arthur
Republican
Elected President
Grover Cleveland
Democratic

The 1884 United States presidential election in Nevada took place on November 4, 1884, as part of the 1884 United States presidential election. Nevada voters chose three representatives, or electors, to the Electoral College, who voted for president and vice president.

Nevada was won by Secretary of State James G. Blaine (R-Maine), running with Senator John A. Logan, with 56.21% of the vote, against Grover Cleveland, the 28th governor of New York, (D–New York), running with the former governor of Indiana Thomas A. Hendricks, with 43.59% of the popular vote.

The Greenback and Anti-Monopoly Parties both chose major general and former governor of Massachusetts Benjamin Butler and Absolom M. West, an unseated Mississippi representative, received 0.20% of the vote for the scant 26 votes they received.

This is one of only three elections as of 2024 where a Democrat won the presidency without carrying Nevada (the other instances were eight years later when Grover Cleveland won a second, non consecutive term as Populist James B. Weaver carried Nevada, and 1976, when Jimmy Carter won a narrow victory). Nevada has been a bellwether state for most of American history, and thus this is one of only eight total elections where Nevada has voted for a losing candidate out of the forty times Nevada has voted in presidential elections. The others are the aforementioned 1892 and 1976, along with Democrat Winfield Scott Hancock's victory four years prior in 1880; all three of Populist Democrat William Jennings Bryan's three runs in 1896, 1900, and 1908; and Hillary Clinton's victory in 2016.

== Results ==
General Election Results
Party	Pledged to	Elector	Votes
Republican Party	James G. Blaine	H. C. Davis	7,193
Republican Party	James G. Blaine	Chancellor Derby	7,176
Republican Party	James G. Blaine	Thompson Campbell	7,164
Democratic Party	Grover Cleveland	A. C. Ellis	5,578
Democratic Party	Grover Cleveland	W. E. F. Deal	5,577
Democratic Party	Grover Cleveland	George Ernst	5,569
Greenback Party	Benjamin Butler	Frank Cook	26
Greenback Party	Benjamin Butler	George B. Hill	26
Greenback Party	Benjamin Butler	G. R. Holcomb	26
Votes cast (Note: Based on totals for highest elector on each ticket)			12,797

=== Results by county ===
	James G. Blaine Republican		Grover Cleveland Democratic		Benjamin Butler Greenback		Margin		Total votes cast (Note: Based on highest elector on each ticket)
County	#	%	#	%	#	%	#	%	Total votes cast
Churchill	96	52.17%	88	47.83%	0	0.00%	8	4.35%	184
Douglas	215	56.28%	167	43.72%	0	0.00%	48	12.57%	382
Elko	692	52.99%	614	47.01%	0	0.00%	78	5.97%	1,306
Esmeralda	559	66.47%	282	33.53%	0	0.00%	277	32.94%	841
Eureka	778	61.21%	493	38.79%	0	0.00%	285	22.42%	1,271
Humboldt	428	44.72%	529	55.28%	0	0.00%	-101	-10.55%	957
Lander	547	57.70%	401	42.30%	0	0.00%	146	15.40%	948
Lincoln	195	42.86%	260	57.14%	0	0.00%	-65	-14.29%	455
Lyon	360	55.90%	284	44.10%	0	0.00%	76	11.80%	644
Nye	207	51.36%	196	48.64%	0	0.00%	11	2.73%	403
Ormsby	537	61.58%	335	38.42%	0	0.00%	202	23.17%	872
Storey	1,488	57.03%	1,121	42.97%	0	0.00%	367	14.07%	2,609
Washoe	716	57.98%	493	39.92%	26	2.11%	223	18.06%	1,235
White Pine	375	54.35%	315	45.65%	0	0.00%	60	8.70%	690
Totals	7,193	56.21%	5,578	43.59%	26	0.20%	1,615	12.62%	12,797

==== Counties that flipped from Democratic to Republican ====
- Churchill
- Douglas
- Elko
- Esmeralda
- Lander
- Nye
- Storey
- Washoe
- White Pine

== See also ==
- United States presidential elections in Nevada
