= 1976 United States presidential election =

Election of Jimmy Carter

- November 2, 1976

538 members of the Electoral College 270 electoral votes needed to win
- Opinion polls
- Turnout: 54.8% (▼1.4 pp)

Nominee	Jimmy Carter	Gerald Ford
Party	Democratic	Republican
Home state	Georgia	Michigan
Running mate	Walter Mondale	Bob Dole
Electoral vote	297	240 (Note: A faithless Republican elector, Mike Padden in Washington, voted for Ronald Reagan to be president. Padden voted for Bob Dole to be vice president as pledged. As a result, Ford had 240 electoral votes instead of the pledged 241.)
States carried	23 + DC	27
Popular vote	40,831,881	39,148,634
Percentage	50.1%	48.0%
- Presidential election results map. Blue denotes states won by Carter/Mondale and red denotes those won by Ford/Dole. Pink represents the sole electoral vote for Reagan/Dole by a Washington faithless elector. Numbers indicate electoral votes cast by each state and the District of Columbia.
President before election
Gerald Ford
Republican
Elected President
Jimmy Carter
Democratic

A presidential election was held in the United States on November 2, 1976. The Democratic ticket of former Georgia governor Jimmy Carter and Minnesota senior senator Walter Mondale narrowly defeated the Republican ticket of incumbent president Gerald Ford and Kansas junior senator Bob Dole. This was the first presidential election since 1932 in which the incumbent was defeated, as well as the only one of the six presidential elections from 1968 to 1988 to have the Democratic Party ticket win.

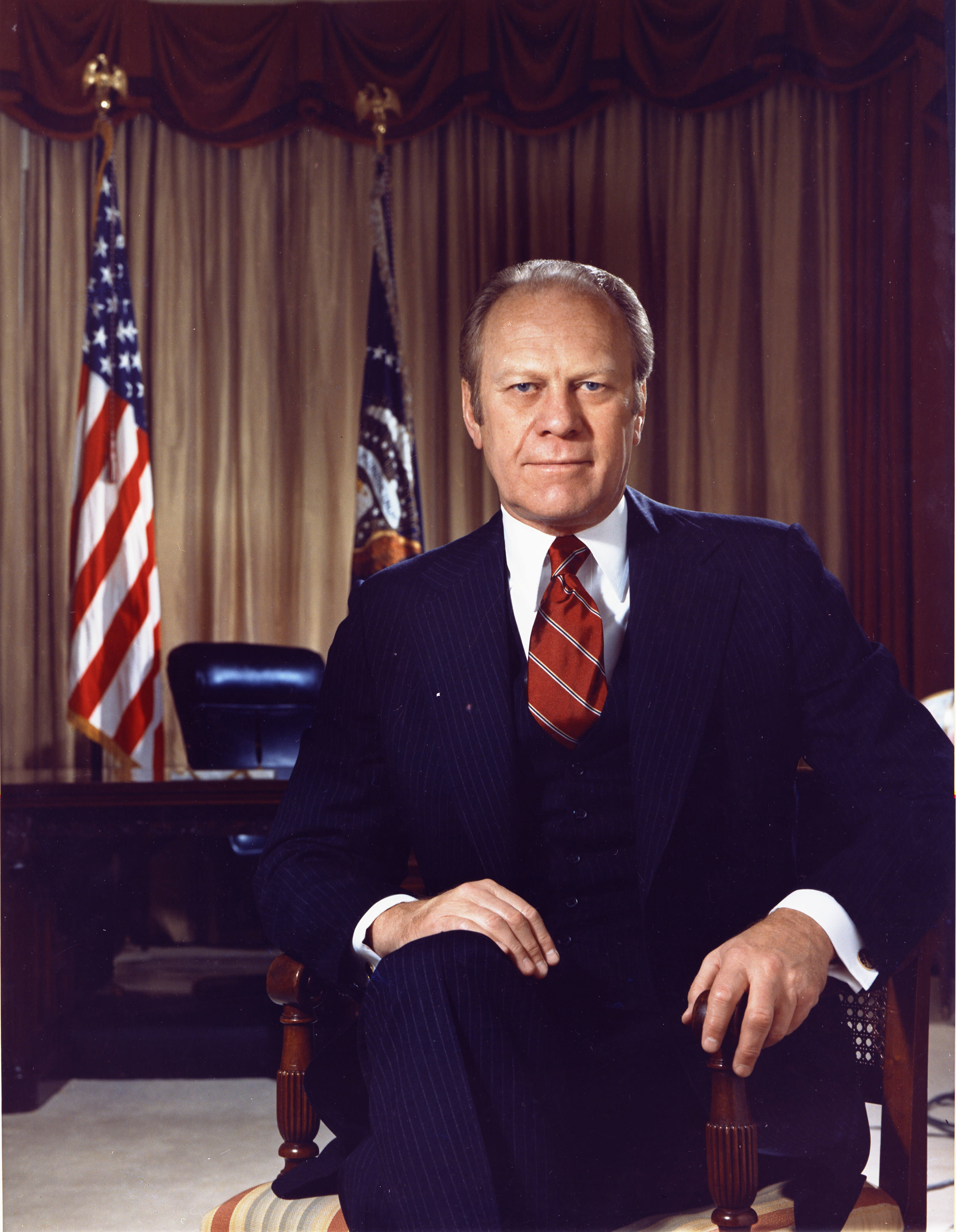
Gerald Ford, the incumbent president in 1976, whose partial term expired at noon on January 20, 1977

Ford ascended to the presidency when Richard Nixon resigned in 1974 in the wake of the Watergate scandal, which badly damaged the Republican Party and its electoral prospects. Ford previously served as Nixon's second vice president after his first vice president, Spiro Agnew, resigned in 1973 due to a bribery scandal. Ford promised to continue Nixon's political agenda and govern as a moderate Republican, causing considerable backlash from the conservative wing of his party. Ford narrowly prevailed against former movie star and California governor Ronald Reagan in the Republican primaries. Carter was unknown outside of his home state of Georgia at the start of the Democratic primaries, but he emerged as the front-runner after his victories in the first set of primaries. Campaigning as a political moderate within his own party and as a Washington outsider, Carter defeated numerous opponents to clinch the Democratic nomination.

Ford pursued a "Rose Garden strategy" in which he sought to portray himself as an experienced leader focused on fulfilling his role as chief executive. On the other hand, Carter emphasized his status as a reformer who was "untainted" by Washington. Saddled with a poor economy, the fall of South Vietnam, and the political fallout from the Watergate scandal, including his unpopular pardon of Richard Nixon, Ford trailed by a wide margin in polls taken after Carter's formal nomination in July 1976. Ford's polling rebounded after a strong performance in the first presidential debate, and the race was close on election day.

Carter won the election with 297 Electoral College votes and took 50.1% of the popular vote. He carried several Midwestern and Northeastern states along with every state in the Deep South, becoming the first Democrat to accomplish this feat since Franklin D. Roosevelt in 1944. Carter's narrow victories in Ohio and Wisconsin, which carried a combined 36 electoral votes, were crucial to his win. Meanwhile, Ford swept the West Coast and Mountain states and took 48.0% of the popular vote. Ford became the first president to have served without ever winning a national election as president or vice president. His loss to Carter was due in part to the backlash against Republican candidates nationwide in the wake of the Watergate scandal, a trend that became apparent in the 1974 elections.

== Nominations ==
=== Democratic Party ===
Democratic Party (United States) 1976 Democratic Party ticket
Jimmy Carter	Walter Mondale
for President	for Vice President
76th Governor of Georgia (1971–1975)	U.S. Senator from Minnesota (1964–1976)
Campaign

=== Candidates ===
Candidates in this section are sorted by date of withdrawal from the nomination race
Jerry Brown	George Wallace	Mo Udall	Ellen McCormack	Frank Church	Henry M. Jackson
Governor of California (1975–1983)	Governor of Alabama (1963–1967; 1971–1979)	U.S. Representative for Arizona's 2nd congressional district (1961–1991)	Chair of the New York Right to Life Party (1970–1976)	U.S. Senator from Idaho (1957–1981)	U.S. Senator from Washington (1953–1983)
Campaign	Campaign	Campaign	Campaign	Campaign	Campaign
LN: July 15, 1976; 2,449,374 votes	LN: July 15, 1976; 1,955,388 votes	LN: July 15, 1976; 1,611,754 votes	LN: July 15, 1976; 238,027 votes	W: June 14, 1976; 830,818 votes	W: May 1, 1976; 1,134,375 votes
Lloyd Bentsen	Milton Shapp	Fred Harris	Sargent Shriver	Birch Bayh	Terry Sanford
U.S. Senator from Texas (1971–1993)	Governor of Pennsylvania (1971–1979)	U.S. Senator from Oklahoma (1964–1973)	U.S. Ambassador to France from Maryland (1968–1970)	U.S. Senator from Indiana (1963–1981)	Governor of North Carolina (1961–1965)
Campaign	Campaign	Campaign	Campaign	Campaign	Campaign
W: May 1, 1976; 346,714 votes	W: April 27, 1976; 88,254 votes	W: April 2, 1976; 234,568 votes	W: March 16, 1976; 304,399 votes	W: March 4, 1976; 86,438 votes	W: January 25, 1976; 404 votes

The surprise winner of the 1976 Democratic presidential nomination was Jimmy Carter, a former state senator and governor of Georgia. When the primaries began, Carter was little-known at the national level, and many political pundits regarded a number of better-known candidates, such as Senator Henry M. Jackson from Washington, Representative Morris Udall from Arizona, Governor George Wallace of Alabama, and California Governor Jerry Brown, as the favorites for the nomination. However, in the wake of the Watergate scandal, Carter realized that his status as a Washington outsider, political centrist, and moderate reformer could give him an advantage over his better-known establishment rivals. Carter also took advantage of the record number of state primaries and caucuses in 1976 to eliminate his better-known rivals one-by-one.

Henry M. Jackson made a fateful decision not to compete in the early Iowa caucus and New Hampshire primary, which Jimmy Carter won after liberals split their votes among four other candidates. Though Jackson went on to win the Massachusetts and New York primaries, he was forced to quit the race on May 1, after losing the critical Pennsylvania primary to Carter by twelve percentage points. Carter then defeated Governor Wallace, his main conservative challenger, by a wide margin in the North Carolina primary, forcing Wallace to end his campaign. Representative Udall, a liberal, then became Carter's main challenger. He finished second to Carter in the New Hampshire, Massachusetts, Wisconsin, New York, Michigan, South Dakota, and Ohio primaries, and won the caucuses in his home state of Arizona, while running even with Carter in the New Mexico caucuses. However, the fact that Udall finished second to Carter in most of these races meant that Carter steadily accumulated more delegates for the nomination than Udall did.

As Carter closed in on the nomination, an "ABC" ("Anybody But Carter") movement started among Northern and Western liberal Democrats who worried that Carter's Southern upbringing would make him too conservative for the Democratic Party. The leaders of the "ABC" movement, Idaho Senator Frank Church and California Governor Jerry Brown, both announced their candidacies for the Democratic nomination, and defeated Carter in several late primaries. However, their campaigns started too late to prevent Carter from gathering the remaining delegates he needed to capture the nomination.

By June 1976, Carter had captured more than enough delegates to win the Democratic nomination. At the 1976 Democratic National Convention, Carter easily won the nomination on the first ballot; Udall finished in second place. Carter then chose Minnesota Senator Walter Mondale, a liberal, as his running mate.

=== Republican Party ===
Republican Party (United States) 1976 Republican Party ticket
Gerald Ford	Bob Dole
for President	for Vice President
38th President of the United States (1974–1977)	U.S. Senator from Kansas (1969–1996)
Campaign

=== Candidates ===
Candidates in this section are sorted by date of withdrawal from the nomination race
Ronald Reagan

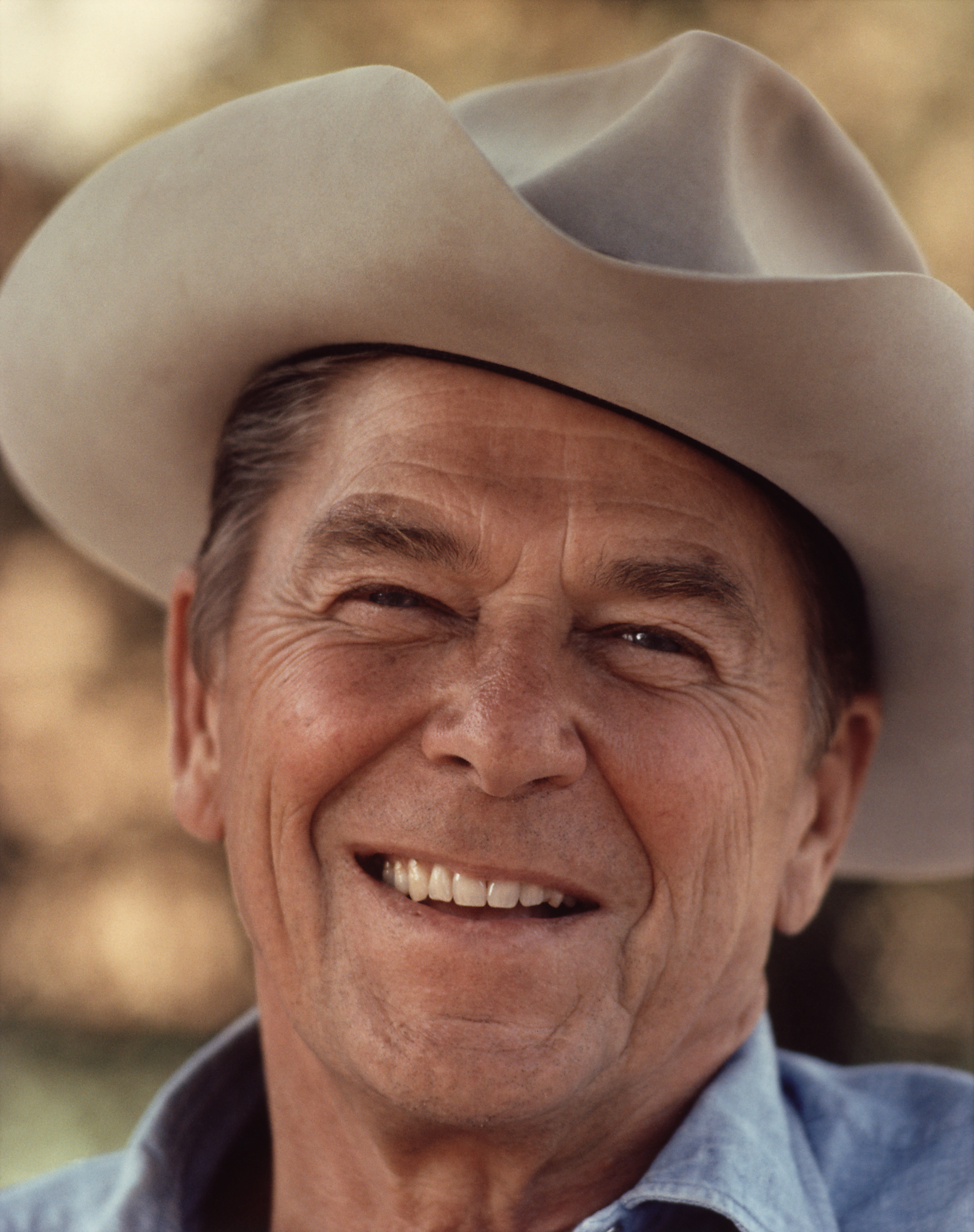

Governor of California
(1967–1975)

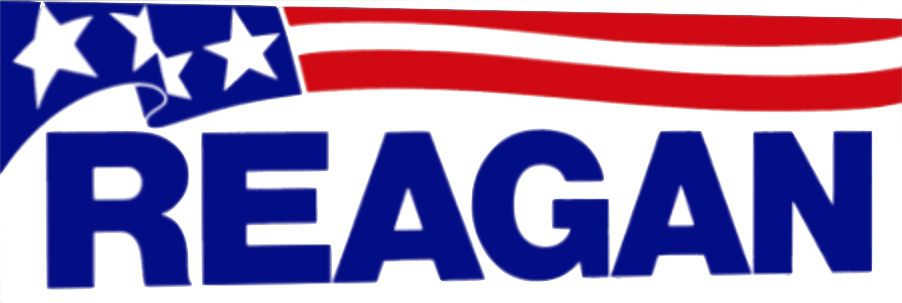

Campaign
LN: August 19, 1976
4,760,222 votes

The contest for the Republican Party's presidential nomination in 1976 was between two serious candidates: incumbent president Gerald Ford, a member of the party's moderate wing, and former governor of California Ronald Reagan, a member of the party's conservative wing. The presidential primary campaign between the two men was hard-fought and relatively even; by the start of the Republican Convention in August 1976, the race for the nomination was still too close to call. Ford defeated Reagan by a narrow margin on the first ballot at the 1976 Republican National Convention in Kansas City, and chose Senator Bob Dole from Kansas as his running mate in the place of incumbent vice president Nelson Rockefeller, who had announced the previous year that he was not interested in being considered for the vice presidential nomination. The 1976 Republican Convention was the last political convention to open with the presidential nomination still being undecided until the actual balloting at the convention.

=== Third-party and independent candidates ===
- Roger MacBride, who had gained fame in the 1972 election as a faithless elector, ran as the nominee of the Libertarian Party.
- Eugene McCarthy, a former Democratic Senator from Minnesota, ran as an independent candidate.
- Ben Bubar, Prohibition Party nominee.
- Frank Zeidler, former mayor of Milwaukee, Wisconsin, ran as the nominee of Socialist Party USA, which was founded in 1973 in a split with Socialist Party of America.
- Gus Hall, four-time Communist Party candidate
- Lester Maddox, the former Democratic Governor of Georgia (and Lieutenant Governor under Carter), ran as the nominee of the American Independent Party

== General election ==
=== Polling aggregation ===
The following graph depicts the standing of each candidate in the poll aggregators from January 1976 to Election Day.

Jimmy Carter Gerald Ford Eugene McCarthy

=== Polling ===
Poll source	Date(s) administered	Jimmy Carter (D)	Gerald Ford (R)	Eugene McCarthy (I)	Other	Undecided	Margin
Election Results	November 2, 1976	50.08%	48.02%	0.91%	0.99%	—	2.06
Harris	October 29–31, 1976	46%	45%	3%	1%	5%	1
Gallup	October 28–30, 1976	46%	47%	2%	1%	4%	1
Harris	October 23–26, 1976	45%	44%	4%	—	7%	1
Gallup	October 22–25, 1976	49%	44%	2%	1%	4%	5
Harris	October 19–22, 1976	45%	42%	5%	1%	7%	3
Gallup	October 15–18, 1976	47%	41%	2%	2%	8%	6
Gallup	October 8–11, 1976	48%	42%	2%	2%	6%	6
Harris	October 7–11, 1976	44%	40%	6%	1%	9%	4
Harris	October 7–11, 1976	47%	42%	—	—	11%	5
Gallup	Sep. 27-Oct. 4, 1976	47%	45%	1%	1%	6%	2
Gallup	September 24–27, 1976	51%	40%	4%	1%	4%	11
Harris	September 24–25, 1976	46%	39%	5%	1%	9%	7
Harris	September 24–25, 1976	50%	41%	—	—	9%	9
Gallup	August 27–30, 1976	54%	36%	—	2%	8%	18
Gallup	August 20–23, 1976	50%	37%	—	—	13%	13
Harris	August 18–20, 1976	53%	39%	6%	—	2%	14
August 16–19: Republican National Convention
Gallup	August 6–9, 1976	54%	32%	6%	1%	8%	22
Gallup	August 6–9, 1976	57%	32%	—	3%	8%	25
Harris	Jul. 31-Aug. 4, 1976	61%	32%	—	—	7%	29
Harris	July 16–19, 1976	62%	27%	5%	—	6%	35
Gallup	July 16–19, 1976	62%	29%	—	—	9%	33
July 12–15: Democratic National Convention
Gallup	June 25–28, 1976	53%	36%	—	—	11%	17
Gallup	June 11–14, 1976	55%	37%	—	3%	5%	18
Harris	June 9–14, 1976	53%	40%	—	—	7%	13
Gallup	Apr. 30-May 3, 1976	52%	43%	—	—	5%	9
Harris	April 9–15, 1976	47%	43%	—	—	10%	4
Gallup	April 9–12, 1976	49%	43%	—	2%	6%	6
Gallup	March 26–29, 1976	47%	46%	—	2%	5%	1
Gallup	March 19–22, 1976	48%	46%	—	—	6%	2
Harris	March 13–22, 1976	42%	49%	—	—	9%	7
Harris	Late January, 1976	37%	48%	—	—	15%	11
Harris	January 5–14, 1976	36%	49%	—	—	15%	13

=== Fall campaign ===
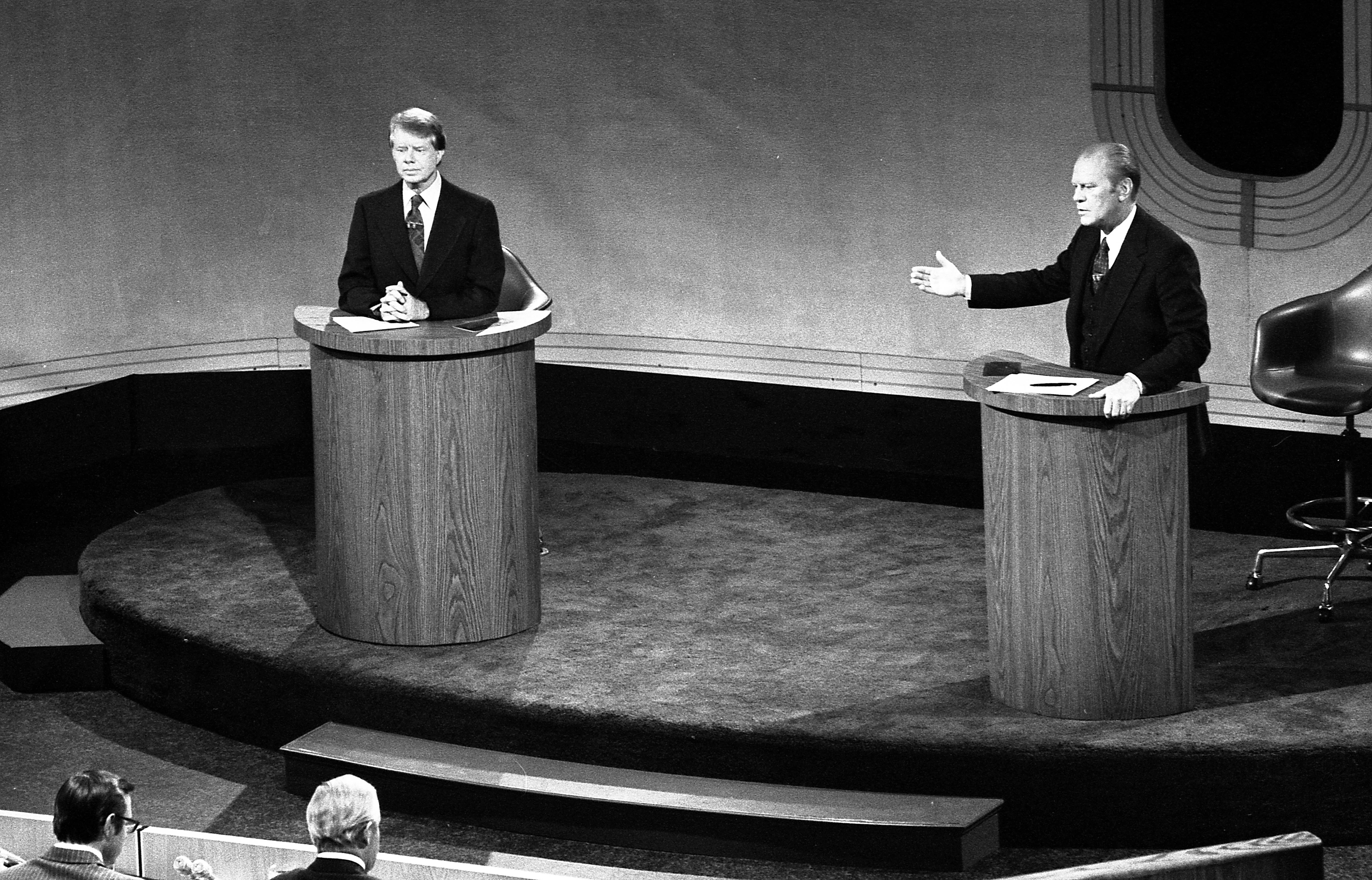
Former Governor Jimmy Carter (left) and President Gerald Ford (right) at the presidential debate at Walnut Street Theatre in Philadelphia on September 23, 1976

One of the advantages Ford held over Carter as the general election campaign began was his presidential privilege to preside over events celebrating the United States Bicentennial; this often resulted in favorable publicity for Ford. These included the Washington, D. C., fireworks display on the Fourth of July, which was televised nationally. On July 7, 1976, the President and First Lady served as hosts at a White House state dinner for Queen Elizabeth II and Prince Philip of the United Kingdom, which was televised on the Public Broadcasting Service (PBS) network. These events were part of Ford's "Rose Garden" strategy to win the election, meaning that instead of appearing as a typical politician, Ford presented himself as a "tested leader" who was busily fulfilling the role of national leader and chief executive. Not until October did Ford leave the White House to actively campaign across the nation.

Carter ran as a reformer who was "untainted" by Washington political scandals, which many voters found attractive in the wake of the Watergate scandal that had led to President Richard Nixon's resignation. Ford, although personally unconnected with Watergate, was seen by many as too close to the discredited Nixon administration, especially after he granted Nixon a presidential pardon for any crimes he might have committed during his term of office. Ford's pardon of Nixon caused his popularity, as measured by public opinion polls, to plummet. Ford's refusal to explain his reasons for pardoning Nixon publicly (he would do so in his memoirs several years later), also hurt his image.

Ford unsuccessfully asked Congress to end the 1950s-era price controls on natural gas, which had caused a dwindling of American natural gas reserves after the 1973 oil crisis. Carter stated during his campaign that he opposed the ending of the price controls and thought such a move would be "disastrous".

After the Democratic National Convention, Carter held a 33-point lead over Ford in the polls. However, as the campaign continued, the race greatly tightened. During the campaign Playboy magazine published a controversial interview with Carter; in the interview, Carter admitted to having "lusted in my heart" for women other than his wife and used the word "screw," which cut into his support among women and evangelical Christians. On September 23, Ford performed well in what was the first televised presidential debate since 1960. Polls taken after the debate showed that most viewers felt that Ford was the winner. Carter was also hurt by Ford's charges that he lacked the necessary experience to be an effective national leader and that he was vague on many issues.

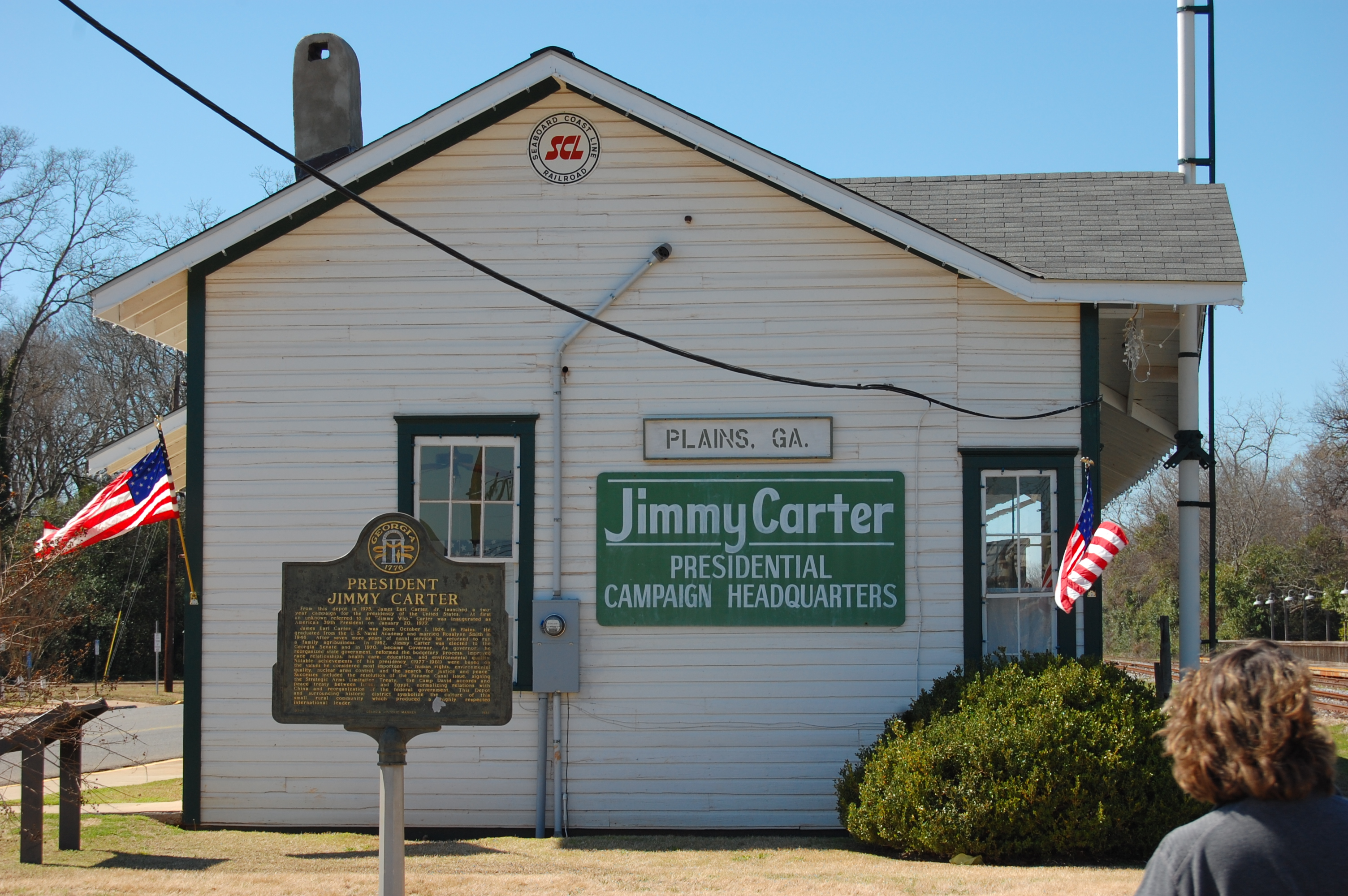
Carter campaign headquarters

However, Ford also committed a costly blunder in the campaign that halted his momentum. During the second presidential debate on October 6, Ford stumbled when he asserted that "there is no Soviet domination of Eastern Europe, and there never will be under a Ford administration". He added that he did not "believe that the Poles consider themselves dominated by the Soviet Union", and made the same claim with regard to Yugoslavia and Romania (Yugoslavia was not a Warsaw Pact member). Ford refused to retract his statement for almost a week after the debate, causing his surge in the polls to stall and allowing Carter to maintain a slight lead in the polls.

A vice-presidential debate, the first formal one of its kind, between Bob Dole and Walter Mondale also hurt the Republican ticket when Dole asserted that military unpreparedness on the part of Democratic presidents was responsible for all of the wars the U.S. had fought in the 20th century. Dole, a World War II veteran, noted that in every 20th-century war, from World War I to the Vietnam War, a Democrat had been president. Dole then pointed out that the number of U.S. casualties in "Democrat wars" was roughly equal to the population of Detroit. Many voters felt that Dole's criticism was unfairly harsh, and that his dispassionate delivery made him seem cold. Years later, Dole would remark that he regretted the comment, believing that it had hurt the Republican ticket. One factor that did help Ford in the closing days of the campaign was a series of popular television appearances he did with Joe Garagiola, a retired baseball player for the St. Louis Cardinals and a well-known announcer for NBC Sports. Garagiola and Ford appeared in a number of shows in several large cities. During the show, Garagiola would ask Ford questions about his life and beliefs; the shows were so informal, relaxed, and laid-back that some television critics labelled them the "Joe and Jerry Show". Ford and Garagiola obviously enjoyed one another's company, and they remained friends after the election was over.

=== Presidential debates ===
There were three presidential debates and one vice presidential debate during the 1976 general election.

Debates among candidates for the 1976 U.S. presidential election
No.	Date	Host	City	Moderator	Panelists	Participants	Viewership (Millions)
P1	Thursday, September 23	Walnut Street Theatre	Philadelphia, Pennsylvania	Edwin Newman	Elizabeth Drew; James P. Gannon; Frank Reynolds	Gov. Jimmy Carter; Pres. Gerald Ford	69.7
P2	Wednesday, October 6	Palace of Fine Arts	San Francisco, California	Pauline Frederick	Max Frankel; Henry Trewhitt; Richard Valeriani	Gov. Jimmy Carter; Pres. Gerald Ford	63.9
VP	Friday, October 15	Alley Theatre	Houston, Texas	James Hoge	Marilyn Berger; Hal Bruno; Walter Mears	Sen. Bob Dole; Sen. Walter Mondale	43.2
P3	Friday, October 22	Phi Beta Kappa; Memorial Hall	Williamsburg, Virginia	Barbara Walters	Joseph Kraft; Robert Maynard; Jack Nelson	Gov. Jimmy Carter; Pres. Gerald Ford	62.7

== Results ==
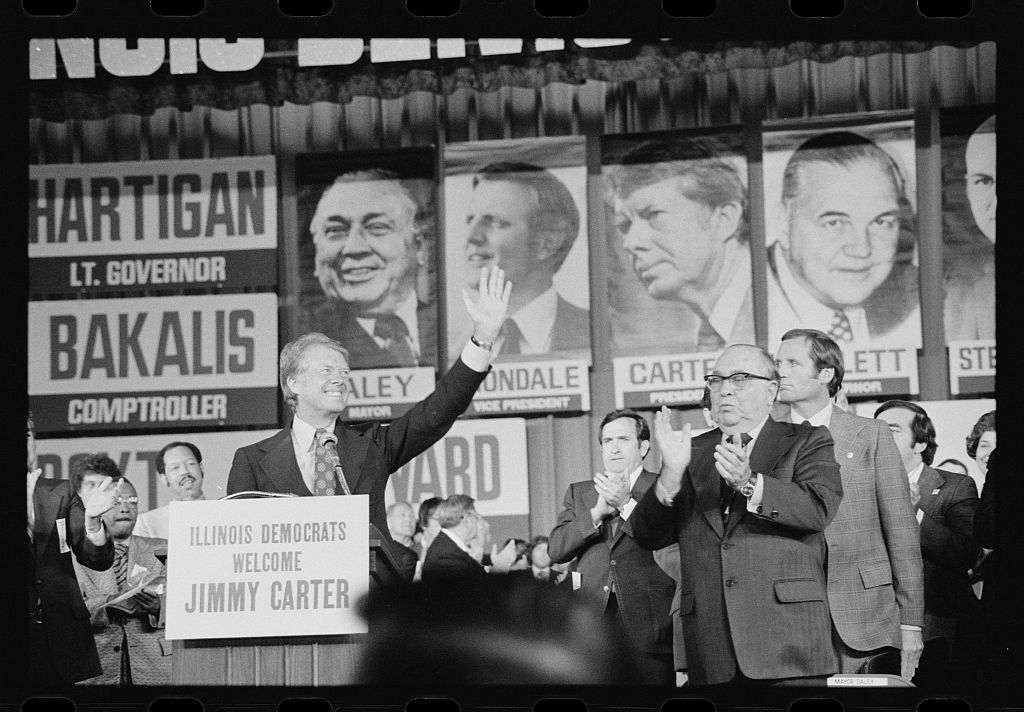
Jimmy Carter and Richard J. Daley at Illinois Democratic Convention in Chicago, 1976

Despite his campaign's blunders, President Ford managed to close the remaining gap in the polls, and by election day, the race was judged to be even. It took most of that night and the following morning to determine the winner. It was not until 3:30 am EST that NBC was able to declare that Carter had carried Mississippi and had thus accumulated more than the 270 electoral votes needed to win. Seconds later, ABC also declared Carter the winner, based on projections for Carter in Wisconsin and Hawaii, while CBS announced Carter's victory at 3:45 am. Carter defeated Ford by two percentage points in the national popular vote.

The electoral vote was the closest since 1916; Carter carried 23 states, with 297 electoral votes, while Ford won 27 states, with 240 electoral votes (one elector, future state Senator Mike Padden from Washington state, pledged to Ford, voted for Reagan). Carter's victory came primarily from his near-sweep of the South (he lost only Virginia and Oklahoma), and his narrow victories in large Northern states such as New York, Ohio, and Pennsylvania. Ford did well in the West, carrying every state in that region, except for Hawaii. The most tightly contested state in the election was Oregon, which Ford won by under 2,000 votes.

By percentage of the vote, the states that secured Carter's victory were Wisconsin (1.68% margin) and Ohio (.27% margin). Had Ford won these states and all other states he carried, he would have won the presidency. The 27 states he won were, and still are, the most states ever carried by a losing candidate for president. Had Ford won the election, the provisions of the 22nd Amendment would have disqualified him from running again, as he served more than two years of Nixon's second term.

=== Records ===
Carter became the first non-incumbent president representing a Southern state to be elected since Zachary Taylor in 1848. As of 2026, this is the last election in which the Democratic ticket won the majority of states in the South or the states of Alabama, Mississippi, South Carolina, and Texas (mainly due to Carter's southern roots), as well as the most recent election in which the losing candidate carried more states than the winning candidate. As a result of his loss, Ford became the most recent person to serve as president without ever being elected to the office, and the first since Chester A. Arthur to do so. Both major-party vice-presidential nominees would later unsuccessfully run for President: Walter Mondale (Democratic) in 1984 and Bob Dole (Republican) in 1996.

Carter was the first Democratic presidential nominee since John F. Kennedy in 1960 to carry states in the Deep South (Bill Clinton was the only Democrat since 1976 to carry more than one state from the Deep South, doing so in 1992), and the only one since Lyndon B. Johnson in 1964 to carry a majority of all southern states. Carter performed very strongly in his home state of Georgia, carrying 66.7% of the vote and every county in the state. His winning of 23 states was only the second time in history that the winner of the election won fewer than half the states (after 1960). His 50.1% of the vote was the only time since 1964 that a Democrat managed to obtain an absolute majority of the popular vote in a presidential election until Barack Obama won 52.9% of the vote in 2008. Carter is one of six Democrats since the American Civil War to obtain an absolute majority of the popular vote, the others being Samuel J. Tilden, Franklin D. Roosevelt, Lyndon B. Johnson, Barack Obama, and Joe Biden.

This election represents the last time to date that Texas, Mississippi, Alabama, and South Carolina would vote Democratic, and the last time North Carolina would vote Democratic until 2008, as well as the last time Florida voted Democratic until 1996, and the last time Arkansas, Delaware, Kentucky, Louisiana, Missouri, Ohio, Pennsylvania, and Tennessee voted Democratic until 1992.

This election was the last time that a Democrat won the presidency without winning a number of modern blue states and swing states, specifically California, Connecticut, Illinois, Maine, Michigan, Nevada, New Hampshire, New Jersey, New Mexico, Oregon, Vermont, and Washington. In the case of all of these states plus Iowa, this is the most recent election where all of these states were won by the Republican candidate the same time the Democratic candidate won the modern swing state of North Carolina and modern red states of Alabama, Arkansas, Florida, Kentucky, Louisiana, Mississippi, Missouri, Ohio, South Carolina, Tennessee and Texas, and in the case of Oregon and Washington, the last time the Republican candidate carried these states while losing Massachusetts, New York and Wisconsin; all 5 of these states except Wisconsin in 2016 and 2024 have stayed in the Democratic column from 1988 onward.

This is the only time a Democrat has won without New Mexico, as well as one of only two times it voted for a candidate who lost the popular vote, in addition to 2024. Similarly, it is one of only three instances in which a Democrat won without Nevada (the others being the two elections of Grover Cleveland in 1884 and 1892). The Democrats did not win without Iowa again until 2020. This was the last time a winning Democrat won both Georgia and Florida. All future Democratic presidents won one of the two, but not both simultaneously.

It was the first time in exactly 100 years when Florida and Virginia supported different candidates, and the first time since Oklahoma statehood in 1907 when Oklahoma and Tennessee did so. It was also the most recent election in which a losing Republican candidate carried any states in the Northeast. As Carter won 319 more counties than Ford, this election would mark the last time a Democrat won a majority of counties. This was the first election since 1916 in which the winning candidate won fewer than 300 electoral votes; this would not happen again until 2000. Carter also remains the last Democrat to win a presidential election while winning fewer than 300 electoral votes.

This election was the last time until 2024 in which the popular vote margin in all 50 states and the District of Columbia swung in the same direction from the previous election, and the most recent in which they all swung Democratic.

This is the last election in which an incumbent president ran with a running mate who was not the incumbent vice president. This is the only election in which all four major presidential and vice presidential candidates would at some point be their party's nominee for president and lose. In addition to Ford losing this election, Carter would lose reelection to Reagan in 1980, Mondale would lose to President Reagan in 1984, and Dole would lose to President Bill Clinton in 1996.

=== National ===
Electoral results
Presidential candidate	Party	Home state	Popular vote		Electoral vote	Running mate		
Presidential candidate	Party	Home state	Count	Percentage	Electoral vote	Vice-presidential candidate	Home state	Electoral vote
Jimmy Carter	Democratic	Georgia	40,831,881	50.08%	297	Walter Mondale	Minnesota	297
Gerald Ford (incumbent)	Republican	Michigan	39,148,634	48.02%	240	Bob Dole	Kansas	241
Ronald Reagan	Republican	California	— (Note: Mike Padden, a Republican faithless elector from Washington, gave Ronald Reagan one electoral vote.)	—	1	Bob Dole	Kansas	241
Eugene McCarthy	None	Minnesota	744,763	0.91%	0	(Note: The running mate of McCarthy varied from state to state.)		0
Roger MacBride	Libertarian	Virginia	172,557	0.21%	0	David Bergland	California	0
Lester Maddox	American Independent	Georgia	170,373	0.21%	0	William Dyke	Wisconsin	0
Thomas J. Anderson	American	(Note: Research has not yet determined whether Anderson's home state was Tennessee or Texas at the time of the 1976 election.)	158,724	0.19%	0	Rufus Shackelford	Florida	0
Peter Camejo	Socialist Workers	California	90,986	0.11%	0	Willie Mae Reid	Illinois	0
Gus Hall	Communist	New York	58,709	0.07%	0	Jarvis Tyner	New York	0
Margaret Wright	People's	California	49,016	0.06%	0	Benjamin Spock	Connecticut	0
Lyndon LaRouche	U.S. Labor	New York	40,018	0.05%	0	R. Wayne Evans	Michigan	0
Other			75,119	0.09%	—	Other		—
Total			81,540,780	100%	538			538
Needed to win					270			270

Source (Popular Vote): Leip, David. "1976 Presidential Election Results". Dave Leip's Atlas of U.S. Presidential Elections.

Source (Electoral Vote): "Electoral College Box Scores 1789–1996". National Archives and Records Administration.

Popular vote
Carter	50.08%
Ford	48.02%
McCarthy	0.91%
Others	0.57%

Electoral vote
Carter	55.20%
Ford	44.61%
Reagan	0.19%

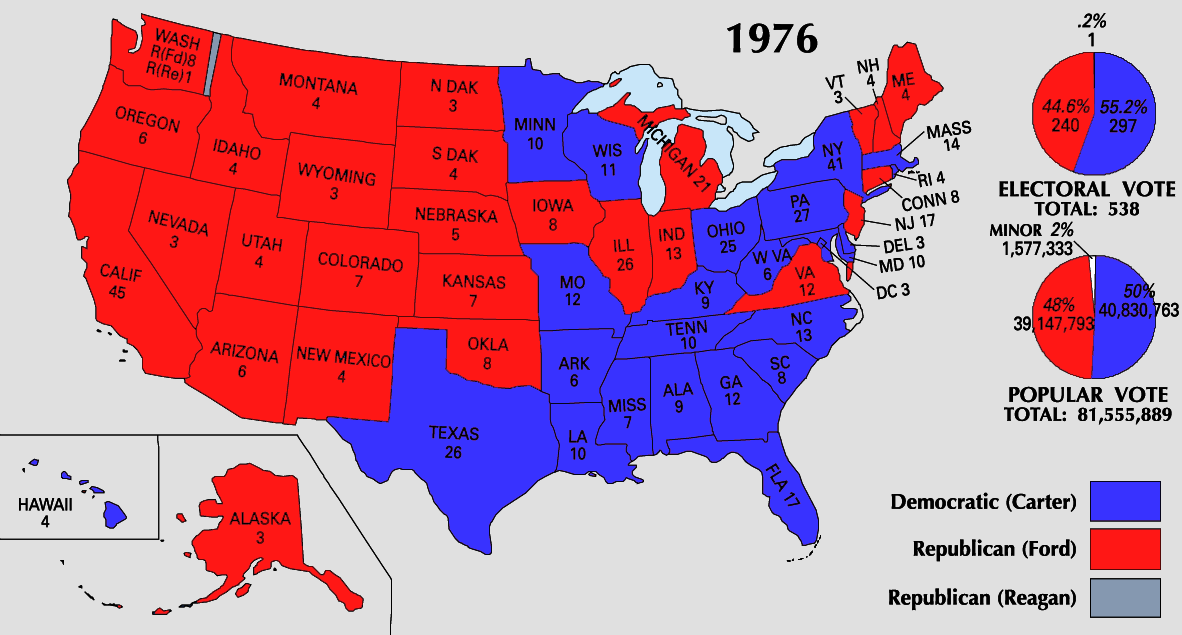

Results by county, shaded according to winning candidate's percentage of the vote

Results by congressional district, shaded according to winning candidate's percentage of the vote

Third place winners

=== Results by state ===
This election represents the second time that the winning candidate has received a majority of the electoral votes while the second-place candidate carried a majority of the states. It had previously happened in the 1960 election. The "margin" column shows the difference between the two leading candidates, and the "swing" column shows the margin swing from the respective party's nominee from 1972 to 1976.

Legend
States/districts won by Ford/Dole
States/districts won by Carter/Mondale
†	At-large results (Maine used the Congressional District Method)

		Jimmy Carter Democratic			Gerald Ford Republican			Eugene McCarthy Independent			Roger MacBride Libertarian			Margin		Margin Swing (Note: Percentage point difference in margin from the 1972 election)	State Total	
State	electoral votes	#	%	electoral votes	#	%	electoral votes	#	%	electoral votes	#	%	electoral votes	#	%	%	#	
Alabama	9	659,170	55.73	9	504,070	42.61	—	—	—	—	1,481	0.13	—	155,100	13.11	60.00	1,182,850	AL
Alaska	3	44,058	35.65	—	71,555	57.90	3	—	—	—	6,785	5.49	—	−27,497	−22.25	1.26	123,574	AK
Arizona	6	295,602	39.80	—	418,642	56.37	6	19,229	2.59	—	7,647	1.03	—	−123,040	−16.57	14.69	742,719	AZ
Arkansas	6	499,614	64.94	6	268,753	34.93	—	647	0.08	—	—	—	—	230,861	30.01	68.12	769,396	AR
California	45	3,742,284	47.57	—	3,882,244	49.35	45	58,412	0.74	—	56,388	0.72	—	−139,960	−1.78	11.68	7,867,117	CA
Colorado	7	460,353	42.58	—	584,367	54.05	7	26,107	2.41	—	5,330	0.49	—	−124,014	−11.47	16.54	1,081,135	CO
Connecticut	8	647,895	46.90	—	719,261	52.06	8	—	—	—	—	—	—	−71,366	−5.17	13.27	1,381,526	CT
Delaware	3	122,596	51.98	3	109,831	46.57	—	2,437	1.03	—	—	—	—	12,765	5.41	25.82	235,834	DE
D.C.	3	137,818	81.63	3	27,873	16.51	—	—	—	—	274	0.16	—	109,945	65.12	8.58	168,830	DC
Florida	17	1,636,000	51.93	17	1,469,531	46.64	—	23,643	0.75	—	103	0.00	—	166,469	5.28	49.40	3,150,631	FL
Georgia	12	979,409	66.74	12	483,743	32.96	—	991	0.07	—	175	0.01	—	495,666	33.78	84.17	1,467,458	GA
Hawaii	4	147,375	50.59	4	140,003	48.06	—	—	—	—	3,923	1.35	—	7,372	2.53	27.49	291,301	HI
Idaho	4	126,549	37.12	—	204,151	59.88	4	—	—	—	3,558	1.04	—	−77,602	−22.76	15.44	340,932	ID
Illinois	26	2,271,295	48.13	—	2,364,269	50.10	26	55,939	1.19	—	8,057	0.17	—	−92,974	−1.97	16.55	4,718,833	IL
Indiana	13	1,014,714	45.70	—	1,183,958	53.32	13	—	—	—	—	—	—	−169,244	−7.62	25.15	2,220,362	IN
Iowa	8	619,931	48.46	—	632,863	49.47	8	20,051	1.57	—	1,452	0.11	—	−12,932	−1.01	16.12	1,279,306	IA
Kansas	7	430,421	44.94	—	502,752	52.49	7	13,185	1.38	—	3,242	0.34	—	−72,331	−7.55	30.60	957,845	KS
Kentucky	9	615,717	52.75	9	531,852	45.57	—	6,837	0.59	—	814	0.07	—	83,865	7.19	35.79	1,167,142	KY
Louisiana	10	661,365	51.73	10	587,446	45.95	—	6,588	0.52	—	3,325	0.26	—	73,919	5.78	42.75	1,278,439	LA
Maine †	2	232,289	48.07	—	236,320	48.91	2	10,874	2.25	—	10	0.00	—	−4,041	−0.84	22.14	483,208	ME
Maine-1	1	123,598	47.90	–	127,019	49.22	1	6,025	2.33	–	–	–	–	−3,421	−1.32	21.53	258,041	ME1
Maine-2	1	108,681	48.27	–	109,301	48.54	1	4,849	2.15	–	–	–	–	−620	−0.27	22.90	225,167	ME2
Maryland	10	759,612	53.04	10	672,661	46.96	—	—	—	—	—	—	—	86,951	6.07	29.97	1,432,273	MD
Massachusetts	14	1,429,475	56.11	14	1,030,276	40.44	—	65,637	2.58	—	135	0.01	—	399,199	15.67	6.70	2,547,557	MA
Michigan	21	1,696,714	46.44	—	1,893,742	51.83	21	47,905	1.31	—	5,406	0.15	—	−197,028	−5.39	9.00	3,653,749	MI
Minnesota	10	1,070,440	54.90	10	819,395	42.02	—	35,490	1.82	—	3,529	0.18	—	251,045	12.87	18.38	1,949,931	MN
Mississippi	7	381,309	49.56	7	366,846	47.68	—	4,074	0.53	—	2,787	0.36	—	14,463	1.88	60.45	769,360	MS
Missouri	12	998,387	51.10	12	927,443	47.47	—	24,029	1.23	—	—	—	—	70,944	3.63	28.22	1,953,600	MO
Montana	4	149,259	45.40	—	173,703	52.84	4	—	—	—	—	—	—	−24,444	−7.44	12.64	328,734	MT
Nebraska	5	233,692	38.46	—	359,705	59.19	5	9,409	1.55	—	1,482	0.24	—	−126,013	−20.74	20.26	607,668	NE
Nevada	3	92,479	45.81	—	101,273	50.17	3	—	—	—	1,519	0.75	—	−8,794	−4.36	23.00	201,876	NV
New Hampshire	4	147,635	43.47	—	185,935	54.75	4	4,095	1.21	—	936	0.28	—	−38,300	−11.28	17.84	339,618	NH
New Jersey	17	1,444,653	47.92	—	1,509,688	50.08	17	32,717	1.09	—	9,449	0.31	—	−65,035	−2.16	22.64	3,014,472	NJ
New Mexico	4	201,148	48.28	—	211,419	50.75	4	—	—	—	1,110	0.27	—	−10,271	−2.47	22.02	416,590	NM
New York	41	3,389,558	51.95	41	3,100,791	47.52	—	4,303	0.07	—	12,197	0.19	—	288,767	4.43	21.77	6,525,225	NY
North Carolina	13	927,365	55.27	13	741,960	44.22	—	—	—	—	2,219	0.13	—	185,405	11.05	51.63	1,677,906	NC
North Dakota	3	136,078	45.80	—	153,470	51.66	3	2,952	0.99	—	256	0.09	—	−17,392	−5.85	20.43	297,094	ND
Ohio	25	2,011,621	48.92	25	2,000,505	48.65	—	58,258	1.42	—	8,961	0.22	—	11,116	0.27	21.87	4,111,873	OH
Oklahoma	8	532,442	48.75	—	545,708	49.96	8	14,101	1.29	—	—	—	—	−13,266	−1.21	48.49	1,092,251	OK
Oregon	6	490,407	47.62	—	492,120	47.78	6	40,207	3.90	—	—	—	—	−1,713	−0.17	9.95	1,029,876	OR
Pennsylvania	27	2,328,677	50.40	27	2,205,604	47.73	—	50,584	1.09	—	—	—	—	123,073	2.66	22.64	4,620,787	PA
Rhode Island	4	227,636	55.36	4	181,249	44.08	—	479	0.12	—	715	0.17	—	46,387	11.28	17.47	411,170	RI
South Carolina	8	450,825	56.17	8	346,140	43.13	—	—	—	—	—	—	—	104,685	13.04	55.70	802,594	SC
South Dakota	4	147,068	48.91	—	151,505	50.39	4	—	—	—	1,619	0.54	—	−4,437	−1.48	7.15	300,678	SD
Tennessee	10	825,879	55.94	10	633,969	42.94	—	5,004	0.34	—	1,375	0.09	—	191,910	13.00	50.95	1,476,346	TN
Texas	26	2,082,319	51.14	26	1,953,300	47.97	—	20,118	0.49	—	263	0.01	—	129,019	3.17	36.13	4,071,884	TX
Utah	4	182,110	33.65	—	337,908	62.44	4	3,907	0.72	—	2,438	0.45	—	−155,798	−28.79	12.46	541,198	UT
Vermont	3	81,044	43.14	—	102,085	54.34	3	4,001	2.13	—	4	0.00	—	−21,041	−11.20	15.00	187,855	VT
Virginia	12	813,896	47.96	—	836,554	49.29	12	—	—	—	4,648	0.27	—	−22,658	−1.34	36.38	1,697,094	VA
Washington	9	717,323	46.11	—	777,732	50.00	8	36,986	2.38	—	5,042	0.32	—	−60,409	−3.88	14.40	1,555,534	WA
West Virginia	6	435,914	58.07	6	314,760	41.93	—	—	—	—	—	—	—	121,154	16.14	43.36	750,674	WV
Wisconsin	11	1,040,232	49.50	11	1,004,987	47.83	—	34,943	1.66	—	3,814	0.18	—	35,245	1.68	11.35	2,101,336	WI
Wyoming	3	62,239	39.81	—	92,717	59.30	3	624	0.40	—	89	0.06	—	−30,478	−19.49	19.05	156,343	WY
TOTALS:	538	40,831,881	50.08	297	39,148,634	48.02	240	740,460	0.91	—	172,557	0.21	—	1,683,247	2.06	25.21	81,531,584	US

Maine allowed its electoral votes to be split between candidates. Two electoral votes were awarded to the winner of the statewide race and one electoral vote to the winner of each congressional district. Ford won all four votes.

==== States that flipped from Republican to Democratic ====
- Alabama
- Arkansas
- Delaware
- Florida
- Georgia
- Hawaii
- Kentucky
- Louisiana
- Maryland
- Minnesota
- Mississippi
- Missouri
- New York
- North Carolina
- Ohio
- Pennsylvania
- Rhode Island
- South Carolina
- Tennessee
- Texas
- West Virginia
- Wisconsin

==== Close states ====
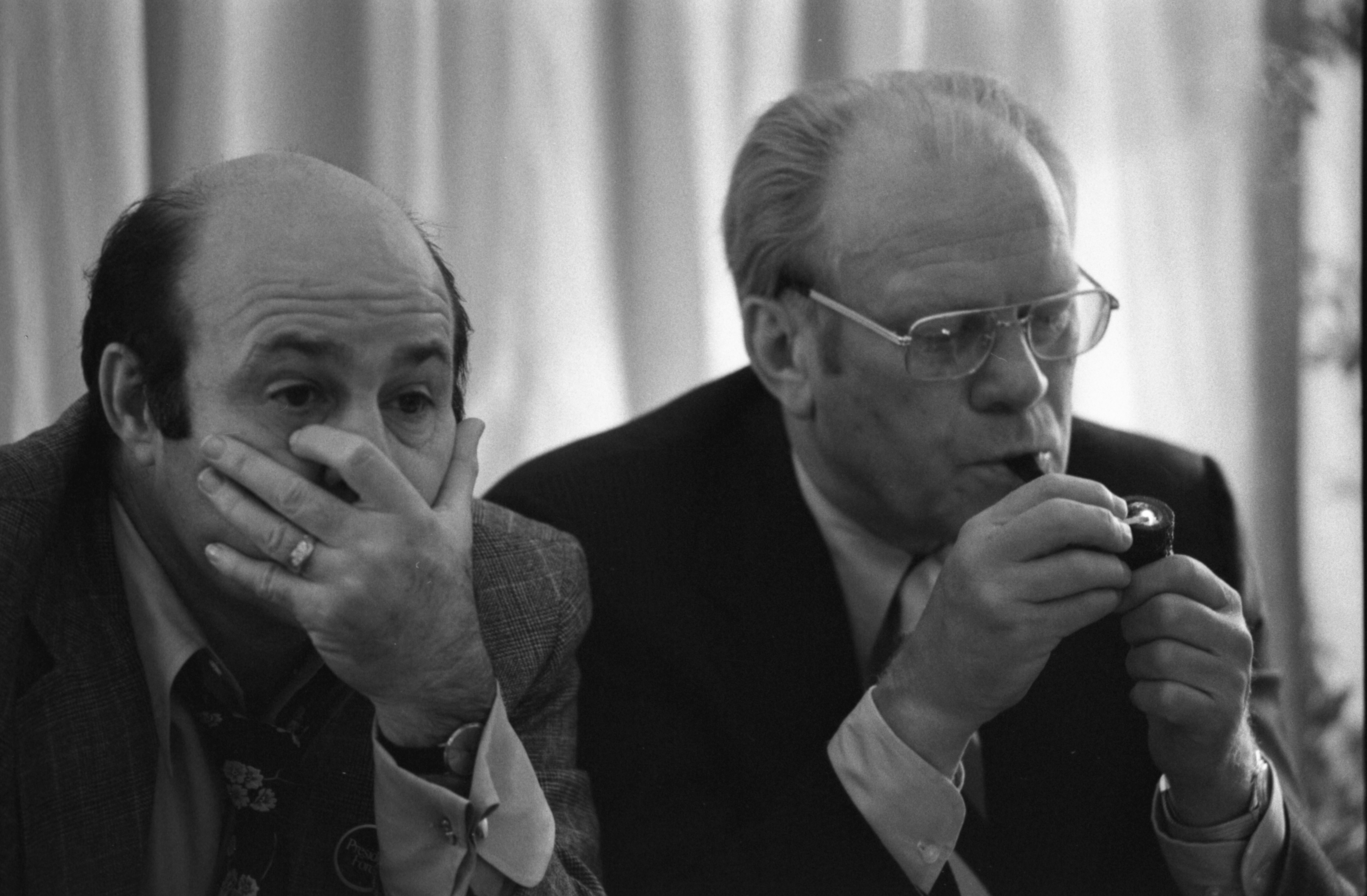
Gerald Ford (right) watching election returns with Joe Garagiola on election night in 1976. Garagiola is reacting to television reports that Ford had just been projected as having lost Texas to Carter.

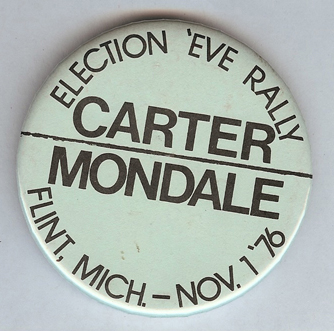
A campaign button from election eve where Carter and Mondale spent the evening in Flint Michigan at a rally It is notable as only a handful of counties in Michigan went to Carter in 1976, and no surrounding counties where Carter held the rally went to him.

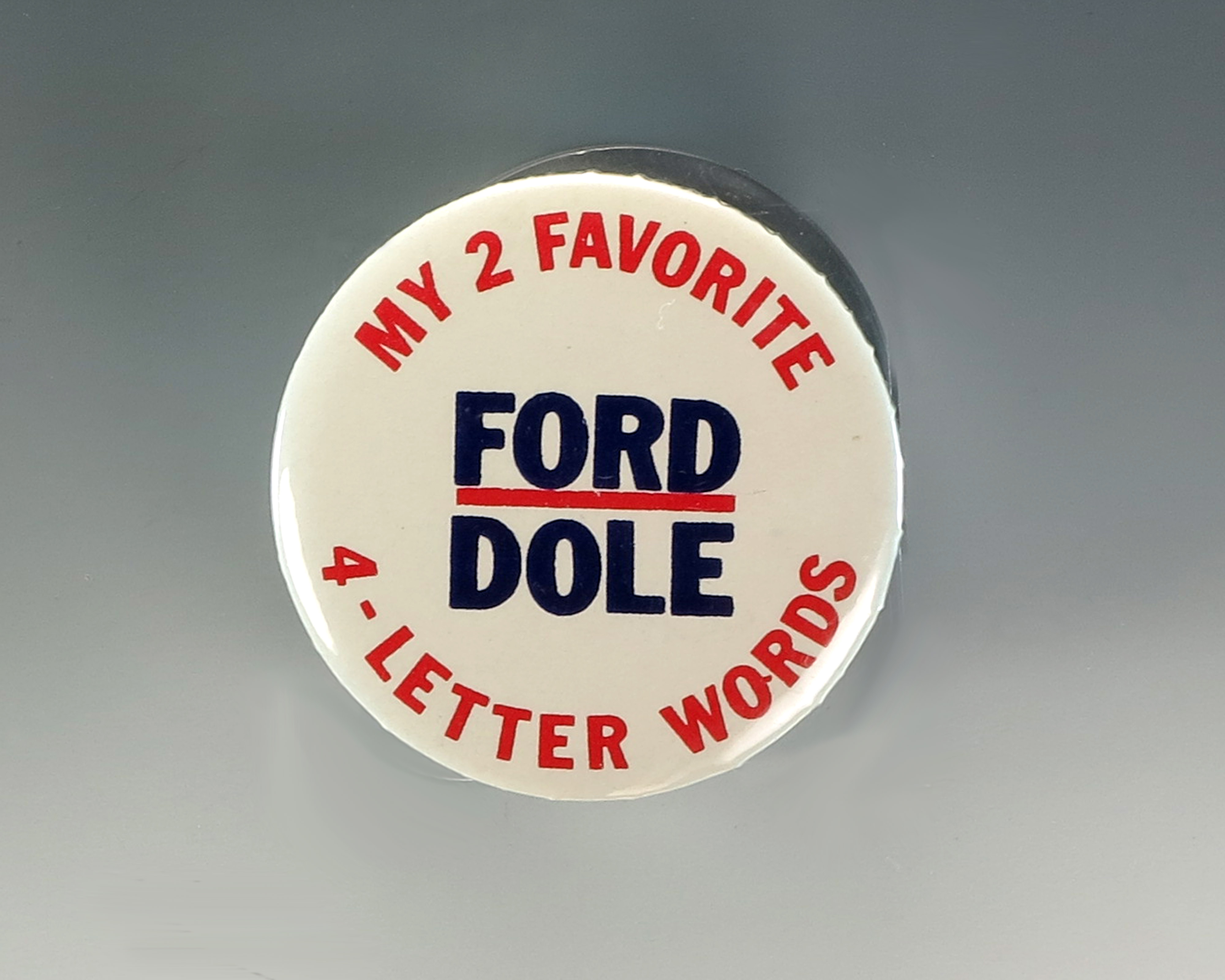
A Ford-Dole campaign button.

States and electoral votes where margin of victory was under 1% (34 electoral votes):

1. Oregon, 0.16% (1,713 votes)
2. Ohio, 0.27% (11,116 votes)
3. Maine's 2nd congressional district, 0.28% (620 votes)
4. Maine, 0.84% (4,041 votes)

States where margin of victory was 1% to 5% (265 electoral votes):

1. Iowa, 1.01% (12,932 votes)
2. Oklahoma, 1.21% (13,266 votes)
3. Virginia, 1.34% (22,658 votes)
4. Maine's 1st congressional district, 1.36% (3,421 votes)
5. South Dakota, 1.48% (4,437 votes)
6. Wisconsin, 1.68% (35,245 votes) (tipping point state)
7. California, 1.78% (139,960 votes)
8. Mississippi, 1.88% (14,463 votes)
9. Illinois, 1.97% (92,974 votes)
10. New Jersey, 2.16% (65,035 votes)
11. New Mexico, 2.47% (10,271 votes)
12. Hawaii, 2.53% (7,372 votes)
13. Pennsylvania, 2.66% (123,073 votes)
14. Texas, 3.17% (129,019 votes)
15. Missouri, 3.63% (70,944 votes)
16. Washington, 3.88% (60,409 votes)
17. Nevada, 4.36% (8,794 votes)
18. New York, 4.43% (288,767 votes)

States where margin of victory was 5% to 10% (105 electoral votes):

1. Connecticut, 5.16% (71,366 votes)
2. Florida, 5.29% (166,469 votes)
3. Michigan, 5.39% (197,028 votes)
4. Delaware, 5.41% (12,765 votes)
5. Louisiana, 5.78% (73,919 votes)
6. North Dakota, 5.86% (17,392 votes)
7. Maryland, 6.08% (86,951 votes)
8. Kentucky, 7.18% (83,865 votes)
9. Montana, 7.44% (24,444 votes)
10. Kansas, 7.55% (72,331 votes)
11. Indiana, 7.62% (169,244 votes)

==== Statistics ====
Counties with Highest Percent of Vote (Democratic)

1. Banks County, Georgia 87.85%
2. Starr County, Texas 87.25%
3. Brantley County, Georgia 86.50%
4. Duval County, Texas 86.36%
5. Wilcox County, Georgia 86.15%

Counties with Highest Percent of Vote (Republican)

1. Jackson County, Kentucky 79.80%
2. Owsley County, Kentucky 77.03%
3. Hooker County, Nebraska 76.35%
4. Ottawa County, Michigan 74.12%
5. Arthur County, Nebraska 73.66%

== Voter demographics ==
With voters 30 years of age or older (born in 1946 or earlier) estimated by the exit poll to comprise 69% of the electorate, the Greatest Generation and the Silent Generation constituted the majority of the voting public. (Note: The last year of the Lost Generation is conventionally defined as 1900, and life expectancy in the United States in 1976 was approximately 73 years.)

Social groups and the presidential vote, 1976
	Carter	Ford	Size (Note: "Size" = share of 1976 national total.)
Party
Democratic	77	22	43
Independent	43	54	23
Republican	9	90	28
Ideology
Liberal	70	26	18
Moderate	51	48	51
Conservative	29	69	31
Ethnicity
Black	82	16	10
Hispanic	74	24	2
White	47	51	88
Gender
Female	50	48	48
Male	50	48	52
Religion
Protestant	44	55	46
White Protestant	42	57	41
Catholic	54	44	25
Jewish	64	34	5
Family income
Less than US$10,000	58	40	13
$10,000–$14,999	55	43	15
$15,000–$24,999	48	50	29
$25,000–$50,000	36	62	24
Over $50,000	—	—	5
Occupation
Professional or manager	41	57	39
Clerical, sales, white-collar	46	53	11
Blue-collar	57	41	17
Farmer	—	—	3
Unemployed	65	34	3
Education
Less than high school	58	39	11
High school graduate	54	44	28
Some college	50	49	28
College graduate	43	55	27
Union membership
Labor union household	59	39	28
No member of household in union	43	55	62
Age
18–21 years old	48	49	6
22–29 years old	51	46	17
30–44 years old	49	49	31
45–59 years old	48	51	23
60 years or older	47	52	18
Region
East	51	47	25
South	54	45	27
Midwest	48	50	27
West	46	51	19
Community size
City over 250,000	58	40	18
Suburb/small city	51	47	53
Rural/town	47	51	29

Source: CBS News/New York Times interviews with 12,782 voters as they left the polls, as reported in The New York Times, November 9, 1980, p. 28, and in further analysis. The 1976 data are from CBS News interviews.

== See also ==
- Bibliography of Gerald Ford
- Presidency of Jimmy Carter
- History of the United States (1964–1980)
- 1976 United States House of Representatives elections
- 1976 United States Senate elections
- 1976 United States gubernatorial elections
- Inauguration of Jimmy Carter
