= Nationwide opinion polling for the 1976 United States presidential election =

This article provides a list of scientific, nationwide public opinion polls that were conducted relating to the 1976 United States presidential election.

== Presidential election ==
=== Jimmy Carter vs Gerald Ford ===
Poll source	Date(s) administered	Jimmy Carter (D)	Gerald Ford (R)	Eugene McCarthy (I)	Other	Undecided	Margin
Harris	January 5–14, 1976	36%	49%	-	—	15%	13
Harris	Late January, 1976	37%	48%	-	—	15%	11
Harris	March, 1976	42%	49%	-	—	9%	7
Gallup	March 10–13, 1976	47%	42%	-	-	11%	5
Gallup	March 19–22, 1976	48%	46%	-	-	6%	2
Gallup	March 26–29, 1976	47%	46%	-	2%	5%	1
Gallup	April 9–12, 1976	49%	43%	-	2%	6%	6
Harris	April 9–15, 1976	47%	43%	-	—	10%	4
Gallup	April 30 – May 3, 1976	52%	43%	-	-	5%	9
Harris	June, 1976	53%	40%	-	-	7%	13
Gallup	June 11–14, 1976	55%	37%	-	3%	5%	18
Gallup	June 25–28, 1976	53%	36%	-	-	11%	17
July 12–15: Democratic National Convention
Harris	July 16–19, 1976	62%	27%	5%	-	6%	35
Gallup	July 16–19, 1976	62%	29%	-	-	9%	33
Harris	July 31 – August 4, 1976	61%	32%	-	-	7%	29
Gallup	August 6–9, 1976	57%	32%	-	3%	8%	25
Gallup	August 6–9, 1976	54%	32%	6%	1%	7%	22
August 16–19: Republican National Convention
Harris	August 18–20, 1976	53%	39%	6%	-	2%	14
Gallup	August 20–23, 1976	50%	37%	-	-	13%	13
Gallup	August 27–30, 1976	54%	36%	-	2%	8%	18
Harris	September 24–25, 1976	50%	41%	-	-	9%	9
Harris	September 24–25, 1976	46%	39%	5%	1%	9%	7
Gallup	September 24–27, 1976	51%	40%	4%	1%	4%	11
Gallup	September 27 – October 4, 1976	47%	45%	1%	1%	6%	2
Harris	October 7–11, 1976	47%	42%	-	-	11%	5
Harris	October 7–11, 1976	44%	40%	6%	1%	9%	4
Gallup	October 8–11, 1976	48%	42%	2%	2%	6%	6
Gallup	October 15–18, 1976	47%	41%	2%	2%	8%	6
Harris	October 19–22, 1976	45%	42%	5%	1%	7%	3
Gallup	October 22–25, 1976	49%	44%	2%	1%	4%	5
Harris	October 23–26, 1976	45%	44%	4%	-	7%	1
Gallup	October 28–30, 1976	46%	47%	2%	1%	4%	1
Harris	October 29–31, 1976	46%	45%	3%	1%	5%	1
Election Results	Nov. 2, 1976	50.08%	48.02%	0.91%	0.99%	-	2.06

== Hypothetical Polling ==
=== Jimmy Carter vs Ronald Reagan ===
Poll source	Date(s) administered	Jimmy Carter (D)	Ronald Reagan (R)	Eugene McCarthy (I)	Other	Undecided	Margin
Harris	January 5–14, 1976	33%	50%	—	—	17%	17
Harris	Late January, 1976	38%	45%	—	—	17%	7
Harris	March, 1976	42%	49%	—	—	9%	7
Harris	April 9–15, 1976	53%	34%	-	—	13%	19
Harris	June, 1976	58%	35%	-	—	7%	23
Gallup	June 11–14, 1976	61%	33%	—	1%	5%	28
Gallup	June 25–28, 1976	64%	28%	—	-	8%	36
Harris	July 16–19, 1976	64%	25%	5%	-	6%	39
Gallup	July 16–19, 1976	63%	28%	—	-	9%	35
Harris	July 31 – August 4, 1976	67%	26%	-	-	7%	41
Gallup	August 6–9, 1976	63%	28%	—	1%	8%	35

=== Morris Udall vs Gerald Ford ===
Poll source	Date(s) administered	Morris Udall(D)	Gerald Ford (R)	Other	Undecided	Margin
Harris	April 1–4, 1975	33%	50%	—	17%	17

=== Scoop Jackson vs Gerald Ford ===
Poll source	Date(s) administered	Scoop Jackson (D)	Gerald Ford (R)	Other	Undecided	Margin
Harris	December, 1973	41%	43%	—	16%	2
Harris	March, 1974	45%	45%	—	10%	0
Gallup	August 12–15, 1974	42%	42%	2%	14%	0
Harris	November 1–4, 1974	35%	52%	-	13%	17
Gallup	November 8–11, 1974	42%	47%	1%	10%	5
Harris	January 2–8, 1975	42%	47%	-	11%	5
Gallup	March 7–10, 1975	41%	43%	3%	13%	2
Harris	April 1–4, 1975	44%	44%	—	12%	0
Gallup	May 30 – June 2, 1975	37%	46%	4%	13%	9
Harris	September, 1975	43%	47%	—	10%	4
Gallup	October 31 – November 3, 1975	44%	44%	-	12%	0
Gallup	March 10–13, 1976	39%	49%	-	12%	10
Gallup	March 19–22, 1976	41%	52%	-	7%	11
Gallup	April 9–12, 1976	37%	56%	1%	6%	19

=== Scoop Jackson vs Spiro Agnew ===
Poll source	Date(s) administered	Scoop Jackson (D)	Spiro Agnew (R)	Other	Undecided	Margin
Harris	September 23–25, 1973	55%	25%	—	20%	30

=== Scoop Jackson vs Nelson Rockefeller ===
Poll source	Date(s) administered	Scoop Jackson (D)	Nelson Rockefeller (R)	Other	Undecided	Margin
Harris	January 2–8, 1975	50%	36%	—	14%	14

=== Jerry Brown vs Gerald Ford ===
Poll source	Date(s) administered	Jerry Brown (D)	Gerald Ford (R)	Other	Undecided	Margin
Harris	September, 1975	30%	53%	—	17%	23
Harris	April 9–15, 1976	48%	38%	—	14%	10

=== George Wallace vs Gerald Ford ===
Poll source	Date(s) administered	George Wallace (D)	Gerald Ford (R)	Other	Undecided	Margin
Harris	March 3–8, 1974	36%	55%	—	9%	19
Gallup	August 12–15, 1974	37%	51%	4%	8%	14
Harris	November 1–4, 1974	30%	61%	-	9%	31
Gallup	November 8–11, 1974	39%	53%	3%	5%	14
Gallup	March 7–10, 1975	39%	49%	4%	8%	10
Harris	May, 1975	31%	60%	—	9%	29
Harris	December, 1975	30%	56%	—	14%	26
Gallup	April 9–12, 1976	26%	66%	4%	4%	40

=== George Wallace vs Ronald Reagan ===
Poll source	Date(s) administered	George Wallace (D)	Ronald Reagan (R)	Other	Undecided	Margin
Harris	December, 1975	27%	57%	—	16%	30

=== Sargent Shriver vs Gerald Ford ===
Poll source	Date(s) administered	Sargent Shriver (D)	Gerald Ford (R)	Other	Undecided	Margin
Harris	September, 1975	40%	52%	—	8%	12

=== Lloyd Bentsen vs Gerald Ford ===
Poll source	Date(s) administered	Lloyd Bentsen (D)	Gerald Ford (R)	Other	Undecided	Margin
Harris	November 1–4, 1974	24%	57%	-	19%	33
Harris	April 1–4, 1975	38%	47%	—	15%	9

=== Birch Bayh vs Gerald Ford ===
Poll source	Date(s) administered	Birch Bayh (D)	Gerald Ford (R)	Other	Undecided	Margin
Harris	September, 1975	31%	52%	—	17%	21
Harris	January 5–14, 1976	36%	49%	—	15%	13

=== Birch Bayh vs Ronald Reagan ===
Poll source	Date(s) administered	Birch Bayh (D)	Ronald Reagan (R)	Other	Undecided	Margin
Harris	January 5–14, 1976	35%	49%	—	16%	14

=== Hubert Humphrey vs Gerald Ford ===
Poll source	Date(s) administered	Hubert Humphrey (D)	Gerald Ford (R)	Other	Undecided	Margin
Harris	April 1–4, 1975	45%	47%	—	8%	2
Gallup	August 15–18, 1975	40%	52%	4%	4%	12
Harris	September, 1975	42%	48%	—	10%	8
Gallup	October 3–6, 1975	42%	50%	3%	5%	8
Harris	November 24 – December 1, 1975	52%	41%	—	7%	11
Gallup	December 5–8, 1975	39%	51%	3%	7%	12
Harris	December, 1975	48%	40%	-	12%	8
Gallup	January 2–5, 1976	46%	48%	2%	4%	2
Harris	January 5–14, 1976	49%	45%	-	6%	4
Gallup	January 23–26, 1976	47%	47%	-	6%	0
Harris	March, 1976	48%	47%	—	5%	1
Gallup	March 10–13, 1976	43%	48%	-	9%	5
Gallup	March 19–22, 1976	46%	49%	-	5%	3
Gallup	March 26–29, 1976	46%	50%	1%	3%	4
Gallup	April 9–12, 1976	48%	46%	2%	4%	2
Harris	April 9–15, 1976	47%	46%	—	7%	1
Gallup	May 21–24, 1976	46%	45%	-	9%	1

=== Hubert Humphrey vs Ronald Reagan ===
Poll source	Date(s) administered	Hubert Humphrey (D)	Ronald Reagan (R)	Other	Undecided	Margin
Harris	November 24 – December 1, 1975	50%	43%	—	7%	7
Gallup	December 5–8, 1975	41%	50%	3%	6%	9
Harris	December, 1975	48%	41%	-	11%	7
Harris	January 5–14, 1976	48%	45%	-	7%	3
Gallup	January 23–26, 1976	47%	45%	-	6%	2
Gallup	May 21–24, 1976	52%	42%	-	6%	10

=== Robert Byrd vs Gerald Ford ===
Poll source	Date(s) administered	Robert Byrd (D)	Gerald Ford (R)	Other	Undecided	Margin
Harris	September, 1975	36%	49%	—	15%	13

=== Edward Kennedy vs Gerald Ford ===
Poll source	Date(s) administered	Edward Kennedy (D)	Gerald Ford (R)	Other	Undecided	Margin
Harris	November, 1973	44%	48%	—	8%	4
Harris	March, 1974	49%	45%	—	6%	4
Gallup	May 10–13, 1974	50%	39%	4%	7%	11
Harris	July, 1974	47%	46%	—	7%	1
Gallup	August 16–19, 1974	33%	57%	-	10%	24
Harris	April 1–4, 1975	50%	43%	—	7%	7
Harris	May 19–23, 1975	46%	48%	—	6%	2
Gallup	May 30 – June 2, 1975	45%	44%	5%	6%	1
Harris	June, 1975	43%	50%	—	7%	7
Gallup	August 18–21, 1975	50%	43%	3%	4%	7
Harris	September, 1975	46%	48%	—	6%	2
Gallup	October 3–6, 1975	48%	44%	4%	4%	4
Harris	December, 1975	49%	41%	-	10%	8
Harris	January 5–14, 1976	50%	46%	-	4%	4

=== Edward Kennedy vs Ronald Reagan ===
Poll source	Date(s) administered	Edward Kennedy (D)	Ronald Reagan (R)	Other	Undecided	Margin
Harris	June, 1973	50%	44%	—	6%	6
Gallup	October 5–8, 1973	50%	43%	2%	5%	7
Harris	March, 1974	51%	43%	—	6%	8
Harris	May, 1974	52%	38%	—	10%	14
Harris	May 19–23, 1975	53%	40%	—	7%	13
Harris	December, 1975	49%	41%	-	10%	8
Harris	January 5–14, 1976	50%	44%	-	6%	6

=== Edward Kennedy vs Charles Percy ===
Poll source	Date(s) administered	Edward Kennedy (D)	Charles Percy (R)	Other	Undecided	Margin
Harris	June, 1973	44%	46%	—	10%	2

=== Edward Kennedy vs Howard Baker ===
Poll source	Date(s) administered	Edward Kennedy (D)	Howard Baker (R)	Other	Undecided	Margin
Harris	July 18–22, 1973	44%	45%	—	11%	1

=== Edward Kennedy vs Spiro Agnew ===
Poll source	Date(s) administered	Edward Kennedy (D)	Spiro Agnew (R)	Other	Undecided	Margin
Harris	October, 1972	51%	43%	—	6%	8
Gallup	October 1–21, 1972	51%	29%	8%	12%	22
Harris	May, 1973	51%	43%	—	6%	8
Harris	June, 1973	50%	42%	—	8%	8
Harris	September 23–25, 1973	57%	31%	—	12%	26

=== Edward Kennedy vs John Connally ===
Poll source	Date(s) administered	Edward Kennedy (D)	John Connally (R)	Other	Undecided	Margin
Harris	June, 1973	49%	45%	—	6%	4

=== Edward Kennedy vs Nelson Rockefeller ===
Poll source	Date(s) administered	Edward Kennedy (D)	Nelson Rockefeller (R)	Other	Undecided	Margin
Harris	June, 1973	51%	41%	—	8%	10

=== Edmund Muskie vs Gerald Ford ===
Poll source	Date(s) administered	Edmund Muskie (D)	Gerald Ford (R)	Other	Undecided	Margin
Harris	November 1–4, 1974	42%	49%	-	9%	7
Gallup	November 8–11, 1974	45%	48%	1%	6%	3
Harris	January 2–8, 1975	45%	46%	-	9%	1
Gallup	March 7–10, 1975	41%	47%	4%	8%	6
Harris	April 1–4, 1975	45%	45%	-	10%	0
Harris	September, 1975	44%	49%	—	7%	5
Gallup	December 5–8, 1975	34%	54%	3%	9%	20

=== Edmund Muskie vs Ronald Reagan ===
Poll source	Date(s) administered	Edmund Muskie (D)	Ronald Reagan (R)	Other	Undecided	Margin
Gallup	December 5–8, 1975	34%	56%	2%	8%	22

=== Edmund Muskie vs Nelson Rockefeller ===
Poll source	Date(s) administered	Edmund Muskie (D)	Nelson Rockefeller (R)	Other	Undecided	Margin
Harris	January 2–8, 1975	50%	38%	—	12%	12

=== Walter Mondale vs Gerald Ford ===
Poll source	Date(s) administered	Walter Mondale (D)	Gerald Ford (R)	Other	Undecided	Margin
Harris	November 1–4, 1974	31%	53%	-	16%	22

=== Walter Mondale vs Spiro Agnew ===
Poll source	Date(s) administered	Walter Mondale (D)	Spiro Agnew (R)	Other	Undecided	Margin
Harris	May, 1973	37%	44%	—	19%	7
Harris	September 23–25, 1973	51%	27%	—	22%	24

=== William Proxmire vs Gerald Ford ===
Poll source	Date(s) administered	William Proxmire (D)	Gerald Ford (R)	Other	Undecided	Margin
Harris	September, 1975	31%	52%	—	17%	21

=== Scoop Jackson vs Gerald Ford vs George Wallace ===
Poll source	Date(s) administered	Scoop Jackson (D)	Gerald Ford (R)	George Wallace (A)	Other	Undecided	Margin
Gallup	October 31 – November 3, 1975	32%	37%	21%	-	10%	5

=== George Wallace vs Gerald Ford vs Fred Harris ===
Poll source	Date(s) administered	George Wallace (D)	Gerald Ford (R)	Fred Harris (I)	Other	Undecided	Margin
Gallup	December, 1975	27%	39%	23%	-	11%	12

=== Hubert Humphrey vs Gerald Ford vs George Wallace ===
Poll source	Date(s) administered	Hubert Humphrey (D)	Gerald Ford (R)	George Wallace (A)	Other	Undecided	Margin
Gallup	August 15–18, 1975	32%	41%	20%	2%	5%	9
Gallup	October 3–6, 1975	33%	39%	24%	2%	5%	6
Gallup	January 2–5, 1976	37%	36%	23%	1%	3%	1

=== Edward Kennedy vs Gerald Ford vs George Wallace ===
Poll source	Date(s) administered	Edward Kennedy (D)	Gerald Ford (R)	George Wallace (A)	Other	Undecided	Margin
Gallup	May 30 – June 2, 1975	39%	34%	19%	2%	6%	5
Gallup	August 17–21, 1975	40%	34%	18%	2%	3%	6
Harris	November, 1975	37.5%	37.5%	20%	-	4%	0

=== Edward Kennedy vs Gerald Ford vs Ronald Reagan ===
Poll source	Date(s) administered	Edward Kennedy (D)	Gerald Ford (R)	Ronald Reagan (C)	Other	Undecided	Margin
Harris	April, 1975	38% (Note: Running with John Glenn)	30% (Note: Running with Nelson Rockefeller)	23% (Note: Running with George Wallace)	-	9%	8
Harris	November, 1975	41%	34%	21%	-	4%	7

=== Edmund Muskie vs Gerald Ford vs Ronald Reagan ===
Poll source	Date(s) administered	Edmund Muskie (D)	Gerald Ford (R)	Ronald Reagan (C)	Other	Undecided	Margin
Harris	April 1–4, 1974	39%	29%	21%	-	11%	10
