= 1892 United States presidential election in Nevada =

- November 8, 1892
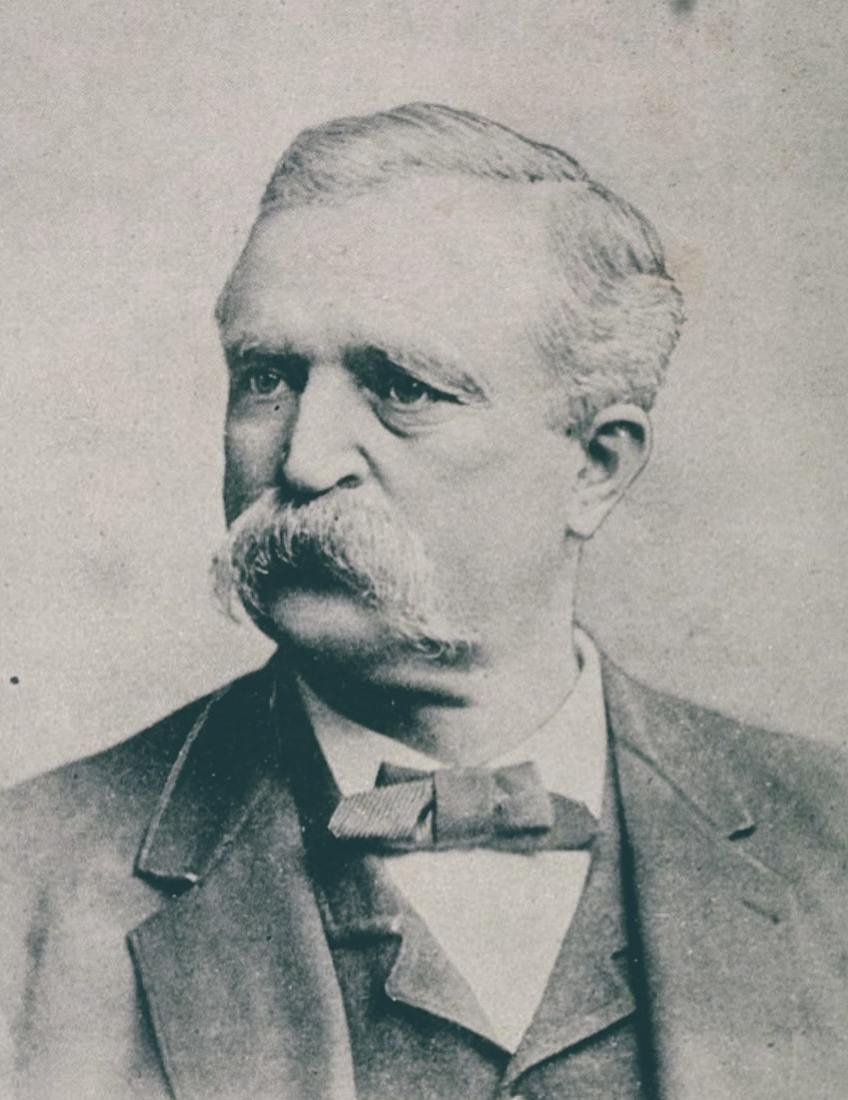

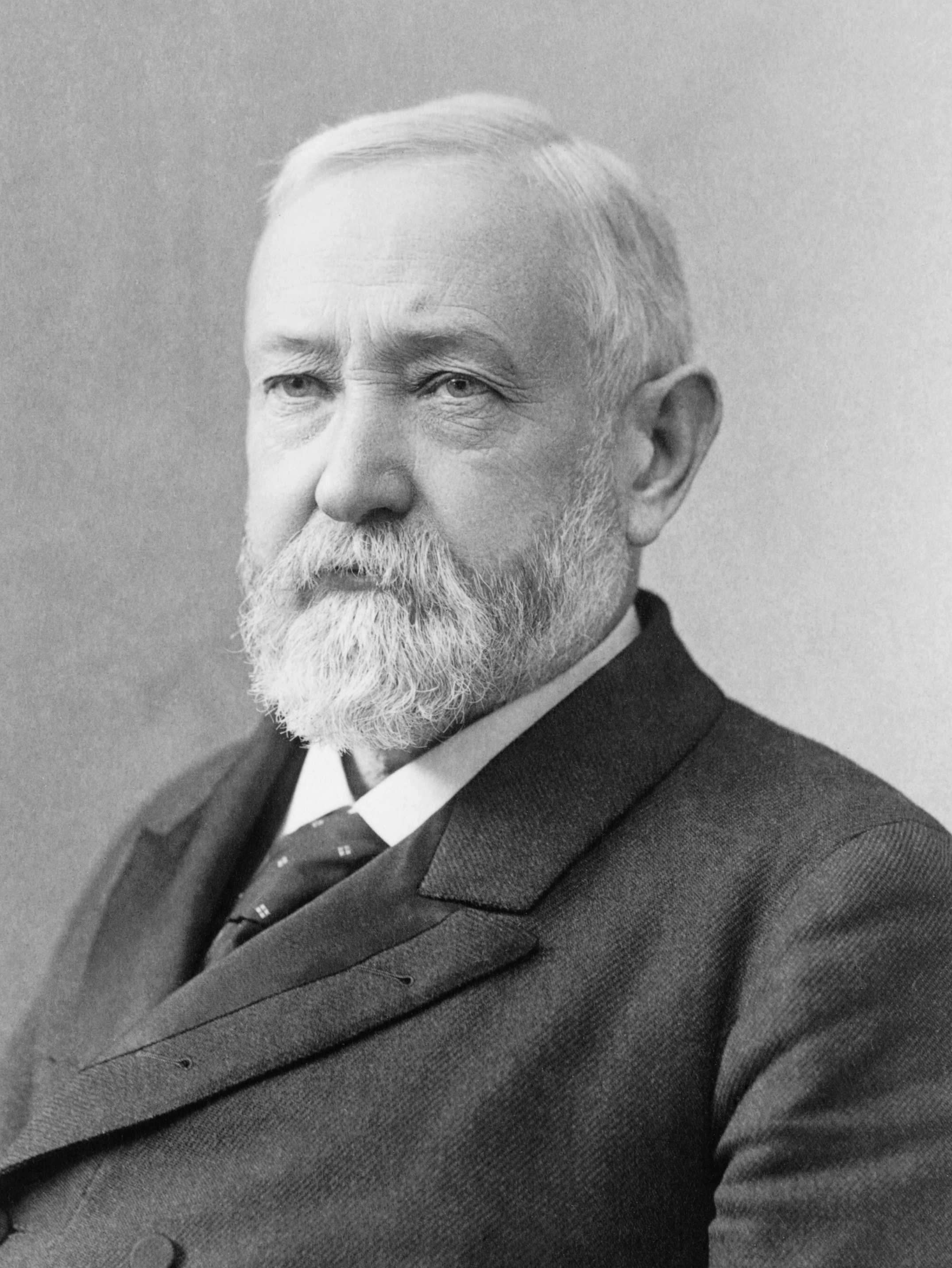

| Nominee | James B. Weaver | Benjamin Harrison | Grover Cleveland |
| Party | Populist | Republican | Democratic |
| Alliance | Silver |
| Home state | Iowa | Indiana | New York |
| Running mate | James G. Field | Whitelaw Reid | Adlai Stevenson I |
| Electoral vote | 3 | 0 | 0 |
| Popular vote | 7,264 | 2,811 | 714 |
| Percentage | 66.78% | 25.84% | 6.56% |
County results
Weaver
50–60%
60–70%
70–80%
80–90%
90–100%
Harrison
40–50%
President before election
Benjamin Harrison
Republican
Elected President
Grover Cleveland
Democratic

The 1892 United States presidential election in Nevada took place on November 8, 1892. All contemporary 44 states were part of the 1892 United States presidential election. State voters chose three electors to the Electoral College, which selected the president and vice president.

Nevada was won by the Populist nominees, James B. Weaver of Iowa and his running mate James G. Field of Virginia. Weaver and Field defeated the Republican nominees, incumbent President Benjamin Harrison of Indiana and his running mate Whitelaw Reid of New York. The state constituted the Populist Party's highest margin of victory in the election. The state would not vote against a winning Democrat again until 1976.

== Campaign ==
The Nevada Democratic Party passed a resolution at its convention on May 26, 1892, stating that it would not support the party's presidential nominee if the convention did not select a free silver candidate. A majority of the party supported People's nominee James B. Weaver while a minority ran electors pledged to Grover Cleveland.

On June 24, the Silver Party of Nevada was formed at a convention in Reno. The party passed a free silver platform and selected presidential electors that were to give their votes to a free silver candidate. On September 15, the party voted to have its Nevada presidential electors support the Populists.

The Nevada Republican Party held a convention on August 30, to select its presidential electors. Party chair Enoch Strother and 49 delegates left the convention after a caucus showed free silver delegates held a majority. These delegates nominated electors pledged to Harrison while the 85 silver delegates endorsed the Silver Party's electors.

== Results ==
General Election Results
| Party | Pledged to | Elector | Votes |
|---|---|---|---|
| People's Party | James B. Weaver | C. C. Powning | 7,264 |
| People's Party | James B. Weaver | M. S. Bonnifield | 7,255 |
| People's Party | James B. Weaver | Thomas Wren | 7,226 |
| Republican Party | Benjamin Harrison | A. C. Cleveland | 2,811 |
| Republican Party | Benjamin Harrison | D. L. Bliss | 2,811 |
| Republican Party | Benjamin Harrison | J. R. Farrell | 2,788 |
| Democratic Party | Grover Cleveland | Joseph R. Ryan | 714 |
| Democratic Party | Grover Cleveland | Theodore Winters | 703 |
| Democratic Party | Grover Cleveland | B. F. Reilly | 689 |
| Prohibition Party | John Bidwell | Charles F. Moore | 89 |
| Prohibition Party | John Bidwell | Abram Banta | 86 |
| Prohibition Party | John Bidwell | William Wilson | 86 |
| Votes cast (Note: Based on totals for highest elector on each ticket) | | | 10,878 |

=== Results by county ===
| | James B. Weaver People's | | Benjamin Harrison Republican | | Grover Cleveland Democratic | | John Bidwell Prohibition | | Margin (Note: Because Weaver and Harrison and ran in the top two places in Nevada and in every county within the state, all margins given are Weaver vote minus Harrison vote and Weaver percentage minus Harrison percentage.) | | Total votes cast (Note: Based on highest elector on each ticket) |
| County | # | % | # | % | # | % | # | % | # | % | Total votes cast |
|---|---|---|---|---|---|---|---|---|---|---|---|
| Churchill | 129 | 67.54% | 57 | 29.84% | 4 | 2.09% | 1 | 0.52% | 72 | 37.70% | 191 |
| Douglas | 157 | 39.75% | 196 | 49.62% | 36 | 9.11% | 6 | 1.52% | -39 | -9.87% | 395 |
| Elko | 892 | 76.57% | 218 | 18.71% | 49 | 4.21% | 6 | 0.52% | 674 | 57.85% | 1,165 |
| Esmeralda | 394 | 78.96% | 84 | 16.83% | 19 | 3.81% | 2 | 0.40% | 310 | 62.12% | 499 |
| Eureka | 706 | 91.33% | 48 | 6.21% | 10 | 1.29% | 9 | 1.16% | 658 | 85.12% | 773 |
| Humboldt | 714 | 89.25% | 54 | 6.75% | 27 | 3.38% | 5 | 0.63% | 660 | 82.50% | 800 |
| Lander | 437 | 83.40% | 52 | 9.92% | 30 | 5.73% | 5 | 0.95% | 385 | 73.47% | 524 |
| Lincoln | 413 | 76.48% | 99 | 18.33% | 26 | 4.81% | 2 | 0.37% | 314 | 58.15% | 540 |
| Lyon | 403 | 67.73% | 152 | 25.55% | 36 | 6.05% | 4 | 0.67% | 251 | 42.18% | 595 |
| Nye | 238 | 91.19% | 14 | 5.36% | 7 | 2.68% | 2 | 0.77% | 224 | 85.82% | 261 |
| Ormsby | 406 | 47.10% | 417 | 48.38% | 31 | 3.60% | 8 | 0.93% | -11 | -1.28% | 862 |
| Storey | 1,189 | 53.78% | 819 | 37.04% | 196 | 8.86% | 7 | 0.32% | 370 | 16.73% | 2,211 |
| Washoe | 834 | 51.23% | 530 | 32.56% | 235 | 14.43% | 29 | 1.78% | 304 | 18.67% | 1,628 |
| White Pine | 352 | 81.11% | 71 | 16.36% | 8 | 1.84% | 3 | 0.69% | 281 | 64.75% | 434 |
| Totals | 7,264 | 66.78% | 2,811 | 25.84% | 714 | 6.56% | 89 | 0.82% | 4,453 | 40.94% | 10,878 |

==== Counties that flipped from Republican to Populist ====
- Churchill
- Elko
- Esmeralda
- Eureka
- Humboldt
- Lander
- Lincoln
- Lyon
- Nye
- Storey
- Washoe
- White Pine

== See also ==
- United States presidential elections in Nevada

== Works cited ==
- Knoles, George (1971). The Presidential Campaign and Election of 1892. Stanford University Press. ISBN 040450969X.
