= John Edwards 2004 presidential campaign =

American political campaign

John Edwards for President 2004
- Campaign: 2004 United States presidential election (Democratic Party primaries)
- Candidate: John Edwards; U.S. Senator from North Carolina (1999–2005)
- Affiliation: Democratic Party
- EC formed: January 2, 2003
- Announced: September 16, 2003
- Suspended: March 3, 2004
- Headquarters: Raleigh, North Carolina
- Slogan: Let's make one America

Website
- John Edwards 2004 (archived - Feb. 27, 2004)

The 2004 presidential campaign of John Edwards, then a U.S. senator from North Carolina, formally began on September 16, 2003, when he announced his candidacy for the Democratic presidential nomination in Robbins, North Carolina. Edwards emerged as a major challenger to John Kerry, particularly after a second-place finish in the Iowa caucuses, and he generally avoided direct attacks on his Democratic rivals for much of the campaign. Near the end of the primary campaign, he more sharply characterized Kerry as a "Washington insider", particularly over trade policy.

After Kerry won nine of the ten states holding contests on Super Tuesday, Edwards formally withdrew on March 3, 2004, and endorsed Kerry. Kerry announced on July 6 that Edwards would be his running mate and the Democratic vice-presidential nominee. The Kerry-Edwards ticket lost the November general election to incumbent Republican president George W. Bush and Vice President Dick Cheney.

== Background and announcement ==
John Edwards campaigning in New Hampshire, January 25th 2004

In 2000, Edwards unofficially began laying the groundwork for a possible presidential campaign by seeking speaking engagements and political contacts in early nominating states, including Iowa. His eventual campaign chairman, North Carolina Democratic activist Ed Turlington, had begun introducing Edwards to influential Democrats in early states before the 2000 presidential election. On January 2, 2003, Edwards formed a presidential exploratory committee, allowing him to begin raising money for a possible candidacy. On September 15, 2003, Edwards announced his intention to seek the nomination during an appearance on The Daily Show with Jon Stewart, fulfilling an earlier promise that he would tell Stewart first if he decided to run. He formally launched the campaign the following morning in Robbins, the North Carolina town where he had grown up, speaking near the textile mill where his father had worked.

At the launch, Edwards emphasized economic opportunity and his working-class family background, arguing that the Bush administration had favored powerful interests over ordinary workers and the middle class. A week before his formal launch, Edwards had announced that he would not seek reelection to the Senate in 2004, saying that he would concentrate on the presidential campaign. Turlington served as chairman of the campaign.

== Campaign timeline ==
=== Early campaign ===
John Edwards speaking at Nashua, New Hampshire, November 7th 2003

As Edwards had been building support well before formally announcing his candidacy, he led the Democratic field in initial campaign fundraising. His committee reported about $7.4 million in receipts during the first quarter of 2003. More than half of the money came from people associated with the legal profession, reflecting Edwards' previous career as a trial lawyer and his extensive network among plaintiffs' attorneys.

Edwards' stump speech centered on the theme of "two Americas", contrasting the economic and political opportunities available to wealthy and powerful Americans with those available to working and middle-class families. The theme, together with Edwards' emphasis on fairness, jobs and economic opportunity, led news coverage to characterize his campaign as a form of southern or economic populism. Edwards also made his refusal to engage in sustained personal attacks on Democratic opponents part of his campaign style, describing his message as positive and "uplifting".

=== First nominating contests ===
Edwards struggled to gain substantial support for much of 2003, but his poll numbers rose sharply in the final weeks before the Iowa caucuses. As recently as November he had been polling in single digits there, and his late momentum was aided by the endorsement of The Des Moines Register and growing crowds at campaign events. Edwards finished a surprising second in Iowa with 32 percent of state delegate equivalents, behind Kerry's 38 percent and ahead of former front-runner Howard Dean at 18 percent. One week later in the New Hampshire primary, he finished fourth behind Kerry, Dean and Wesley Clark, with about 12 percent of the vote.

During the February 3 contests, Edwards won the South Carolina primary with about 45 percent of the vote, his first statewide victory. In Oklahoma, he finished narrowly behind Clark, while Kerry won Arizona, Delaware, Missouri, New Mexico and North Dakota. Kerry then won the February 7 caucuses in Michigan and Washington; Edwards finished third in Michigan and fourth in Washington, having focused more heavily on the approaching contests in the South.

Edwards subsequently finished second to Kerry in Tennessee and Virginia. In Wisconsin on February 17, he again finished second, receiving about 34 percent to Kerry's 40 percent and Dean's 18 percent. Dean ended his active campaign the following day, leaving Edwards as Kerry's only remaining major challenger and turning the contest into a two-man race ahead of the ten-state March 2 round.

=== Super Tuesday 2004 ===
Edwards largely avoided directly attacking Kerry until the final days before Super Tuesday. At a February 26 debate in Los Angeles, he emphasized their differences on trade, special interests and electability and argued that Kerry was too closely identified with Washington. In the February 29 New York debate, their sharpest exchange of the primary campaign, Edwards explicitly portrayed Kerry as a "Washington insider" and mocked Kerry's proposal for a 120-day review of trade agreements as a "Washington committee" response to families that had lost jobs.

In the Super Tuesday primaries and caucuses on March 2, Kerry won nine of the ten states voting; the only exception was Vermont, won by the withdrawn Dean. Edwards came closest in Georgia but failed to win a state and decided to end his campaign. Reports of his impending withdrawal circulated during the evening of March 2, before voting or caucusing had concluded everywhere; he formally suspended his campaign in Raleigh the following day and endorsed Kerry.

Because reports of Edwards' impending withdrawal reached Minnesota as the state's caucuses were beginning, it has been suggested that the timing influenced some caucus-goers and may have contributed to the comparatively strong finish of Dennis Kucinich. Minnesota Public Radio reported that Kerry ultimately received just over half of the preference vote, Edwards 27 percent and Kucinich 17 percent. Edwards also won a presidential straw poll conducted by the Independence Party of Minnesota.

== Results ==
Key results are shown below. The percentages are rounded to whole numbers. State-administered primary results are cross-checked against the Federal Election Commission's official 2004 compilation; caucus placements and rounded figures are also reflected in contemporaneous national and regional reporting.

Nominating Contest	Place ^{1}	Percentage
Iowa	2nd Place	32%
New Hampshire	4th Place	12%
Arizona	4th Place	7%
Delaware	3rd Place	11%
Missouri	2nd Place	25%
New Mexico	4th Place	11%
North Dakota	4th Place	10%
Oklahoma	2nd Place	30%
South Carolina	WIN	45%
Michigan	3rd Place	13%
Washington	4th Place	7%
Tennessee	2nd Place	27%
Virginia	2nd Place	27%
Nevada	3rd Place	11%
Wisconsin	2nd Place	34%
Hawaii	3rd Place	13%
Utah	2nd Place	30%
California	2nd Place	20%
Connecticut	2nd Place	24%
Georgia	2nd Place	41%
Maryland	2nd Place	26%
Massachusetts	2nd Place	18%
Minnesota	2nd Place	27%
New York	2nd Place	20%
Ohio	2nd Place	34%
Rhode Island	2nd Place	19%
Vermont	3rd Place	6%
North Carolina	WIN	51%

- ^1 The table is meant to show all the contests Edwards competed in and won, not a complete list of primary states. That is to say everything on Super Tuesday and before, as well as North Carolina, should be included in the table.

Edwards won the nominating contest (North Carolina and South Carolina).
Edwards came in either 2nd or 3rd place in the nominating contest (Iowa, Delaware, Missouri, Oklahoma, Michigan, Tennessee, Virginia, Nevada, Wisconsin, Hawaii, Utah, California, Connecticut, Georgia, Maryland, Massachusetts, Minnesota, New York, Ohio, Rhode Island, Vermont).
Edwards came in 4th place or below in the nominating contest (New Hampshire, Arizona, New Mexico, North Dakota, Washington).

== After withdrawal ==
=== Surprise North Carolina win ===
After withdrawing from the race, Edwards went on to win the April 17 Democratic caucuses in his home state of North Carolina, with approximately 51 percent of the preference vote. The result made him the only Democratic candidate besides Kerry to win nominating contests in two states.

=== Vice-Presidential nomination ===
On July 6, 2004, Kerry announced that Edwards would be his running mate. Early public-opinion polling was generally favorable toward the selection: a CBS News poll found that 52 percent of voters were glad Edwards had been chosen, while Gallup found that 64 percent said the choice reflected favorably on Kerry's ability to make important presidential decisions. At the same time, Republicans and some commentators highlighted Edwards' relative lack of political and foreign-policy experience; Gallup found that a majority regarded his limited political experience as a weakness, although most of those respondents described it as a minor rather than major weakness.

The selection also drew strong opposition from several national business associations because of Edwards' career as a trial lawyer and his opposition to restrictions on civil litigation. The U.S. Chamber of Commerce and other business groups said the choice would increase their efforts against the Democratic ticket, particularly on tort reform. The reaction was not uniform among individual business executives; the Kerry campaign also publicized executives who supported the ticket.

In the vice-presidential debate on October 5, Cheney criticized Edwards' Senate attendance and incorrectly said that the debate was the first time the two men had met. Reporters subsequently identified earlier encounters, including the 2001 National Prayer Breakfast, where a photograph showed Cheney and Edwards together, and the 2003 swearing-in of Senator Elizabeth Dole.

The Democratic ticket ultimately lost the presidential election and Bush was reelected. Bush received 286 electoral votes to Kerry's 251; one Minnesota elector cast a presidential ballot for Edwards, while Edwards received 252 vice-presidential electoral votes. In 2007, Kerry campaign adviser Bob Shrum wrote that Kerry later told him he regretted choosing Edwards and that the relationship between the two men had soured after the election. In his November 2004 concession remarks, Edwards told supporters, "You can be disappointed, but you cannot walk away. This fight has just begun."
