= 2004 United States presidential election in South Carolina =

- November 2, 2004

| Nominee | George W. Bush | John Kerry |
| Party | Republican | Democratic |
| Home state | Texas | Massachusetts |
| Running mate | Dick Cheney | John Edwards |
| Electoral vote | 8 | 0 |
| Popular vote | 937,974 | 661,699 |
| Percentage | 57.98% | 40.90% |

Bush
40–50%
50–60%
60–70%
70–80%
Kerry
50–60%
60–70%
70–80%
President before election
George W. Bush
Republican
Elected President
George W. Bush
Republican

The 2004 United States presidential election in South Carolina took place on November 2, 2004, as part of the 2004 United States presidential election which took place in all 50 states and D.C. Voters chose eight representatives, or electors, to the Electoral College, who voted for president and vice president.

South Carolina was won by incumbent President George W. Bush by a 17.08% margin of victory. Prior to the election, all 12 news organizations considered this a state Bush would win, or otherwise a red state. No Democrat had won this state since 1976. On election day, Bush won a majority of the counties and congressional districts in the state. The results were very similar to the state's results in 2000, and very similar to the results in neighboring Georgia this election, although Democratic Senator John Edwards of the bordering state of North Carolina was chosen as the vice presidential nominee. Bush won Greenville County, the largest county in the state, by a margin of 33.23%.

== Primaries ==
The 2004 South Carolina democratic presidential primary was held on February 3, 2004, as a part of Mini-Tuesday. On election day John Edwards won 28 of the state's delegates, with John Kerry winning 17. It was one of 2 states that voted for John Edwards in the 2004 democratic presidential primaries. The other being North Carolina, John Edward's home state.

| Key: | Withdrew prior to contest |

South Carolina Democratic presidential primary, 2004
| Candidate | Votes | Percentage | National delegates |
|---|---|---|---|
| John Edwards | 131,174 | 44.86% | 28 |
| John Kerry | 88,508 | 30.27% | 17 |
| Al Sharpton | 28,201 | 9.65% | 0 |
| Wesley Clark | 21,011 | 7.19% | 0 |
| Howard Dean | 13,815 | 4.72% | 0 |
| Joe Lieberman | 7,147 | 2.44% | 0 |
| Dennis Kucinich | 1,319 | 0.45% | 0 |
| Dick Gephardt | 631 | 0.22% | 0 |
| Carol Moseley-Braun | 577 | 0.20% | 0 |
| Totals | 292,383 | 100.00% | 45 |

== Campaign ==
=== Predictions ===
There were 12 news organizations who made state-by-state predictions of the election. Here are their last predictions before election day.

| Source | Ranking |
|---|---|
| D.C. Political Report | Solid R |
| Cook Political Report | Solid R |
| Research 2000 | Solid R |
| Zogby International | Likely R |
| Washington Post | Likely R |
| Washington Dispatch | Likely R |
| Washington Times | Solid R |
| The New York Times | Solid R |
| CNN | Likely R |
| Newsweek | Solid R |
| Associated Press | Solid R |
| Rasmussen Reports | Likely R |

=== Polling ===
Bush won every pre-election poll, each with a double-digit margin (except for one) and with at least 49% of the vote. The final three polls' average showed Bush leading 55% to 41%.

=== Fundraising ===
Bush raised $3,113,641. Kerry raised $533,966.

=== Advertising and visits ===
Neither campaign advertised or visited this state during the fall election.

== Analysis ==
South Carolina, historically part of the Solid South, had become a Republican stronghold in the past few presidential elections. Since Barry Goldwater carried the state in 1964, the only Democratic presidential nominee to win it was Jimmy Carter of neighboring Georgia in 1976. Since then, South Carolina has been a safe bet for the Republicans. As of the 2024 presidential election, this is the last election in which Charleston County voted for a Republican presidential candidate.

== Results ==
2004 United States presidential election in South Carolina
| Party | Candidate | Votes | Percentage | Electoral votes |
|---|---|---|---|---|
| Republican | George W. Bush Dick Cheney | 937,974 | 57.98% | 8 |
| Democratic | John Kerry John Edwards | 661,699 | 40.90% | 0 |
| Independent | Ralph Nader Peter Camejo | 5,520 | 0.34% | 0 |
| Constitution | Michael Peroutka Chuck Baldwin | 5,317 | 0.33% | 0 |
| Libertarian | Michael Badnarik | 3,608 | 0.22% | 0 |
| United Citizens | Walt Brown | 2,124 | 0.13% | 0 |
| Green | David Cobb | 1,488 | 0.09% | 0 |
| Totals | | 1,617,730 | 100.00% | 8 |
| Voter turnout (Voting age population) | | | | 51.8% |

=== By county ===
| County | George W. Bush Republican | | John Kerry Democratic | | Various candidates Other parties | | Margin | | Total votes cast |
| County | # | % | # | % | # | % | # | % | Total votes cast |
|---|---|---|---|---|---|---|---|---|---|
| Abbeville | 5,436 | 54.77% | 4,389 | 44.22% | 100 | 1.01% | 1,047 | 10.55% | 9,925 |
| Aiken | 39,077 | 65.68% | 19,799 | 33.28% | 616 | 1.04% | 19,278 | 32.40% | 59,492 |
| Allendale | 985 | 27.43% | 2,565 | 71.43% | 41 | 1.14% | -1,580 | -44.00% | 3,591 |
| Anderson | 43,355 | 66.99% | 20,697 | 31.98% | 670 | 1.03% | 22,658 | 35.01% | 64,722 |
| Bamberg | 2,138 | 35.42% | 3,841 | 63.63% | 57 | 0.95% | -1,703 | -28.21% | 6,036 |
| Barnwell | 4,606 | 53.03% | 3,982 | 45.85% | 97 | 1.12% | 624 | 7.18% | 8,685 |
| Beaufort | 33,331 | 60.34% | 21,505 | 38.93% | 399 | 0.73% | 11,826 | 21.41% | 55,235 |
| Berkeley | 32,104 | 60.65% | 20,142 | 38.05% | 691 | 1.30% | 11,962 | 22.60% | 52,937 |
| Calhoun | 3,448 | 49.83% | 3,393 | 49.04% | 78 | 1.13% | 55 | 0.79% | 6,919 |
| Charleston | 70,297 | 51.57% | 63,758 | 46.77% | 2,261 | 1.66% | 6,539 | 4.80% | 136,316 |
| Cherokee | 12,090 | 64.60% | 6,466 | 34.55% | 158 | 0.85% | 5,624 | 30.05% | 18,714 |
| Chester | 5,798 | 49.43% | 5,790 | 49.36% | 141 | 1.21% | 8 | 0.07% | 11,729 |
| Chesterfield | 7,252 | 51.62% | 6,729 | 47.90% | 68 | 0.48% | 523 | 3.72% | 14,049 |
| Clarendon | 6,061 | 45.92% | 7,087 | 53.69% | 52 | 0.39% | -1,026 | -7.77% | 13,200 |
| Colleton | 7,264 | 51.50% | 6,699 | 47.49% | 143 | 1.01% | 565 | 4.01% | 14,106 |
| Darlington | 13,416 | 52.71% | 11,829 | 46.47% | 209 | 0.82% | 1,587 | 6.24% | 25,454 |
| Dillon | 4,301 | 46.57% | 4,832 | 52.32% | 102 | 1.11% | -531 | -5.75% | 9,235 |
| Dorchester | 26,006 | 62.94% | 14,733 | 35.66% | 578 | 1.40% | 11,273 | 27.28% | 41,317 |
| Edgefield | 5,611 | 57.57% | 4,051 | 41.57% | 84 | 0.86% | 1,560 | 16.00% | 9,746 |
| Fairfield | 3,531 | 37.42% | 5,764 | 61.09% | 140 | 1.49% | -2,233 | -23.67% | 9,435 |
| Florence | 27,689 | 55.89% | 21,442 | 43.28% | 414 | 0.83% | 6,247 | 12.61% | 49,545 |
| Georgetown | 12,606 | 53.43% | 10,602 | 44.94% | 385 | 1.63% | 2,004 | 8.49% | 23,593 |
| Greenville | 111,481 | 66.03% | 55,347 | 32.78% | 2,005 | 1.19% | 56,134 | 33.25% | 168,833 |
| Greenwood | 14,264 | 60.85% | 8,954 | 38.20% | 224 | 0.95% | 5,310 | 22.65% | 23,442 |
| Hampton | 3,097 | 38.64% | 4,832 | 60.28% | 87 | 1.08% | -1,735 | -21.64% | 8,016 |
| Horry | 50,447 | 62.01% | 29,547 | 36.32% | 1,353 | 1.67% | 20,900 | 25.69% | 81,347 |
| Jasper | 2,933 | 42.84% | 3,840 | 56.09% | 73 | 1.07% | -907 | -13.25% | 6,846 |
| Kershaw | 14,160 | 61.79% | 8,515 | 37.16% | 240 | 1.05% | 5,645 | 24.63% | 22,915 |
| Lancaster | 12,916 | 62.05% | 7,631 | 36.66% | 267 | 1.29% | 5,285 | 25.39% | 20,814 |
| Laurens | 14,466 | 60.71% | 9,205 | 38.63% | 158 | 0.66% | 5,261 | 22.08% | 23,829 |
| Lee | 2,901 | 36.73% | 4,960 | 62.80% | 37 | 0.47% | -2,059 | -26.07% | 7,898 |
| Lexington | 67,132 | 71.85% | 25,393 | 27.18% | 907 | 0.97% | 41,739 | 44.67% | 93,432 |
| Marion | 5,589 | 41.38% | 7,767 | 57.50% | 151 | 1.12% | -2,178 | -16.12% | 13,507 |
| Marlboro | 3,423 | 39.99% | 4,984 | 58.22% | 153 | 1.79% | -1,561 | -18.23% | 8,560 |
| McCormick | 2,396 | 46.78% | 2,648 | 51.70% | 78 | 1.52% | -252 | -4.92% | 5,122 |
| Newberry | 7,654 | 61.68% | 4,483 | 36.13% | 272 | 2.19% | 3,171 | 25.55% | 12,409 |
| Oconee | 18,811 | 68.32% | 8,395 | 30.49% | 326 | 1.19% | 10,416 | 37.83% | 27,532 |
| Orangeburg | 12,695 | 33.80% | 24,698 | 65.75% | 171 | 0.45% | -12,003 | -31.95% | 37,564 |
| Pickens | 29,759 | 73.46% | 10,287 | 25.39% | 464 | 1.15% | 19,472 | 48.07% | 40,510 |
| Richland | 56,212 | 42.01% | 76,283 | 57.01% | 1,306 | 0.98% | -20,071 | -15.00% | 133,801 |
| Saluda | 4,537 | 59.87% | 3,001 | 39.60% | 40 | 0.53% | 1,536 | 20.27% | 7,578 |
| Spartanburg | 62,004 | 64.08% | 33,633 | 34.76% | 1,121 | 1.16% | 28,371 | 29.32% | 96,758 |
| Sumter | 18,074 | 48.84% | 18,695 | 50.52% | 234 | 0.64% | -621 | -1.68% | 37,003 |
| Union | 6,592 | 55.24% | 5,236 | 43.87% | 106 | 0.89% | 1,356 | 11.37% | 11,934 |
| Williamsburg | 4,795 | 34.45% | 9,044 | 64.98% | 79 | 0.57% | -4,249 | -30.53% | 13,918 |
| York | 45,234 | 64.45% | 24,226 | 34.52% | 721 | 1.03% | 21,008 | 29.93% | 70,181 |
| Totals | 937,974 | 57.98% | 661,699 | 40.90% | 18,057 | 1.12% | 276,275 | 17.08% | 1,617,730 |

==== Counties that flipped from Democratic to Republican ====
- Chester (largest city: Chester)

==== Counties that flipped from Republican to Democratic ====
- Sumter (largest city: Sumter)

=== Results by congressional district ===
Bush won five of six congressional districts, including one that elected a Democrat.

| District | Bush | Kerry | Representative |
|---|---|---|---|
| 1st | 61% | 38% | Henry E. Brown Jr. |
| 2nd | 60% | 39% | Joe Wilson |
| 3rd | 65% | 34% | Gresham Barrett |
| 4th | 65% | 34% | Jim DeMint |
| 4th | 65% | 34% | Bob Inglis |
| 5th | 58% | 41% | John Spratt |
| 6th | 39% | 60% | Jim Clyburn |

== Electors ==
Technically the voters of South Carolina cast their ballots for electors: representatives to the Electoral College. South Carolina is allocated eight electors because it has six congressional districts and two senators. All candidates who appear on the ballot or qualify to receive write-in votes must submit a list of eight electors, who pledge to vote for their candidate and his or her running mate. Whoever wins the majority of votes in the state is awarded all eight electoral votes. Their chosen electors then vote for president and vice president. Although electors are pledged to their candidate and running mate, they are not obligated to vote for them. An elector who votes for someone other than his or her candidate is known as a faithless elector.

The electors of each state and the District of Columbia met on December 13, 2004, to cast their votes for president and vice president. The Electoral College itself never meets as one body. Instead, the electors from each state and the District of Columbia met in their respective capitols.

The following were the members of the Electoral College from the state. All 8 were pledged for Bush/Cheney.

1. Katon Dawson
2. Buddy Witherspoon
3. Wayland Moody
4. Thomas McLean
5. Brenda Bedenbaugh
6. Edwin Foulke
7. Robert Reagan
8. Drew McKissick
