= John Edwards presidential campaign =

John Edwards has unsuccessfully run for U.S. President twice:

- John Edwards 2004 presidential campaign, but ended in Edwards as vice presidential nominee
- John Edwards 2008 presidential campaign
