= 2004 Vermont Democratic presidential primary =

- March 2, 2004

15 pledged delegates to the 2004 Democratic National Convention
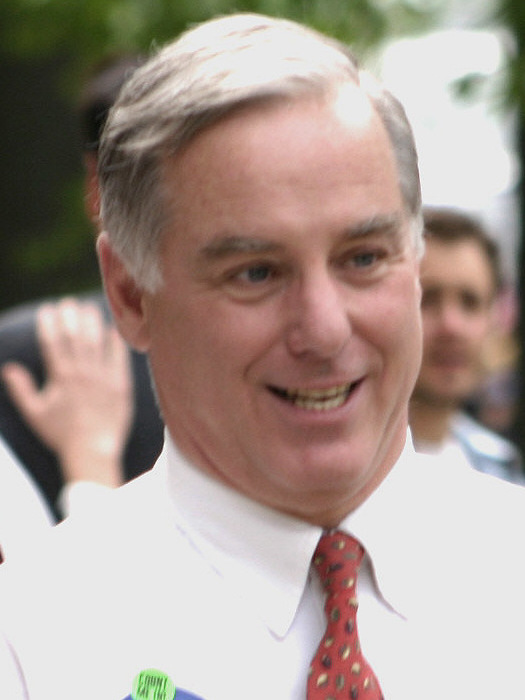

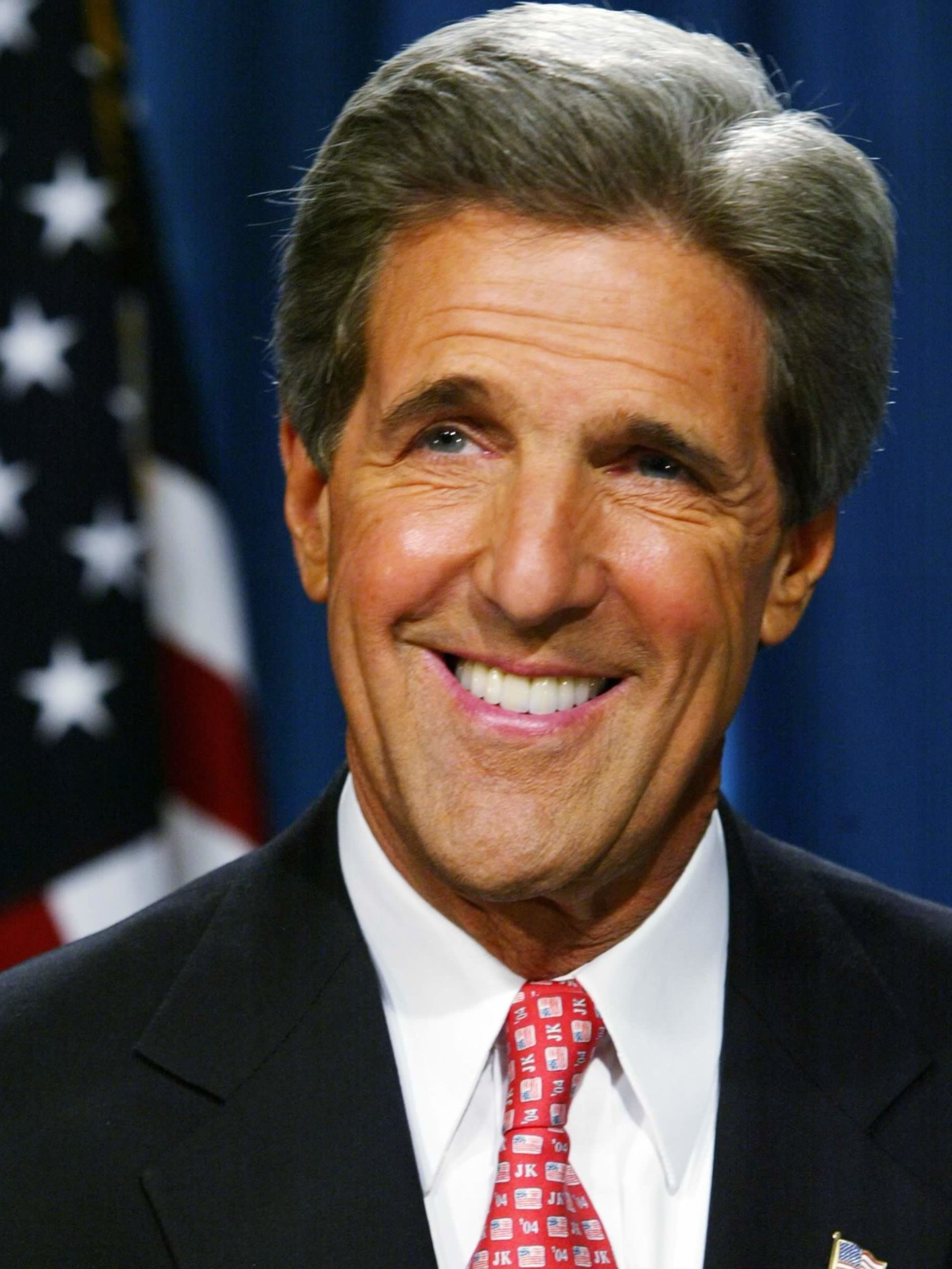

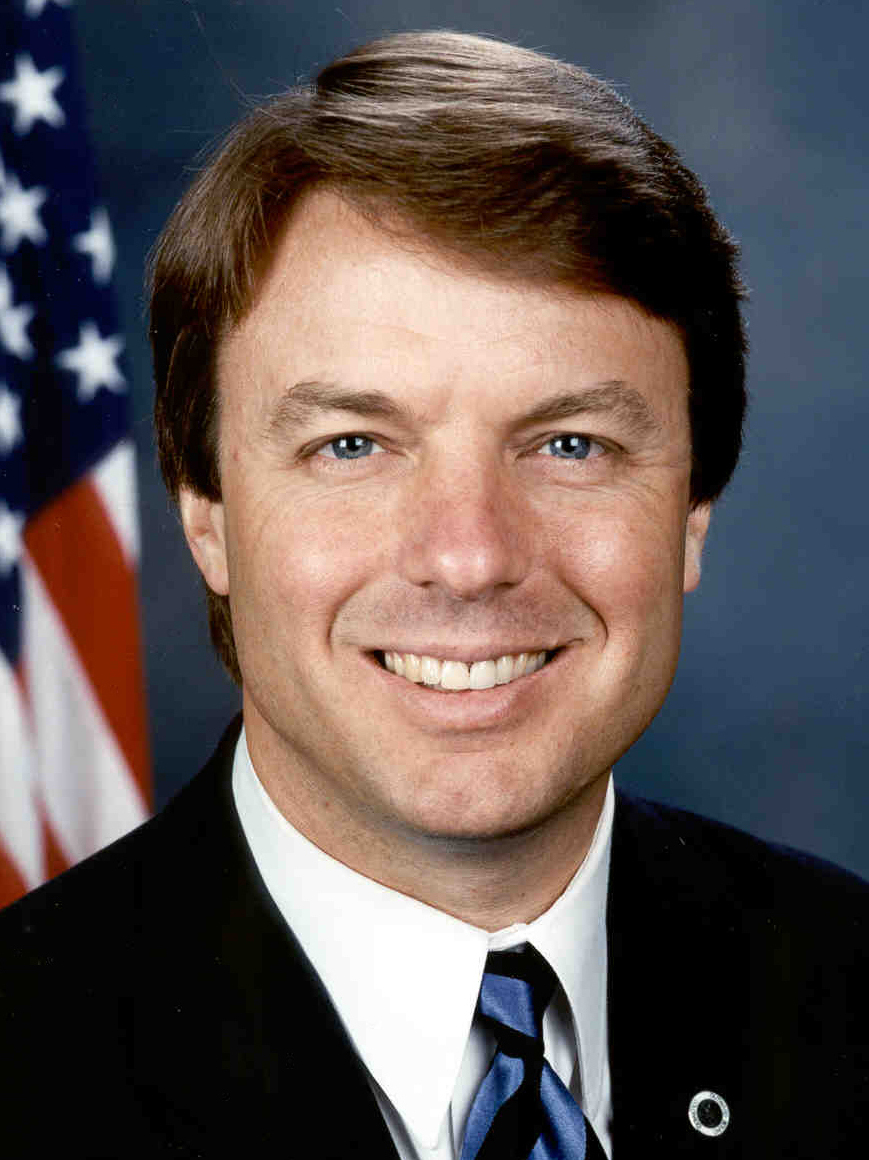
Candidate	Howard Dean (withdrawn)	John Kerry	John Edwards (write-in)
Home state	Vermont	Massachusetts	North Carolina
Delegate count	9	6	0
Popular vote	44,393	26,171	5,113
Percentage	53.56%	31.58%	6.17%

Dean
30–40%
40–50%
50–60%
60–70%
70–80%
Kerry
40–50%
50–60%
60–70%
70–80%
80–90%

The 2004 Vermont Democratic presidential primary took place on March 2, 2004, as part of Super Tuesday along with other primaries and caucuses held throughout the country. Vermont's 15 pledged delegates were allocated based on the results of the primary.

Howard Dean, who had served as Governor of Vermont from 1991 to 2003, won the primary despite having ended his campaign on February 18 following his third-place finish in the Wisconsin primary.

== Procedure ==
=== Ballot access ===
Candidates wishing to appear on the ballot were required to submit at least 1,000 signatures from Vermont voters and pay a $2,000 filing fee. For the 2004 presidential primaries, nominating petitions had to be submitted by January 19, 2004.

=== Delegate allocation ===
Pledged national convention delegates
Type	Del.
CD at-large	10
At-large	3
PLEO	2
Total pledged delegates	15

Vermont was allocated 22 delegates to the Democratic National Convention: 15 were allocated based on the results of the primary, with the other seven being unpledged superdelegates.

In order to qualify for pledged delegates, a candidate had to receive at least 15% of the vote statewide. Five of Vermont's pledged delegates were allocated based on the statewide popular vote, consisting of three at-large delegates and two pledged PLEOs (party leaders and elected officials). As Vermont had only one congressional district, the remaining 10 pledged delegates were also allocated according to the popular vote statewide, with the exact delegates being elected at the State Convention caucuses held on May 22.

== Campaign ==
Apart from Howard Dean, the only major candidates who filed to appear on the ballot by the January 19 deadline were Wesley Clark, John Kerry and Dennis Kucinich. Dean, who had served as governor of the state from 1991 to 2003, was still in the race and was considered the frontrunner for the nomination at the time, discouraging other candidates from contesting the state.

After a disappointing third place finish in the Wisconsin primary, Dean announced the end of his presidential campaign on February 18. In his speech, Dean stated that while he was no longer "actively pursuing" the presidency, his campaign would continue with the goal of "transform[ing] the Democratic Party and to change [the] country." He urged his supporters to continue voting for him in upcoming primaries and caucuses to send more progressive delegates to the Democratic National Convention.

In the days leading up to the primary, supporters of Dean began a campaign to get letters to the editor published in local newspapers to call for readers to cast their vote for Dean. Pro-Dean letters appeared in publications including the Brattleboro Reformer and the Burlington Free Press.

== Results ==
Despite having ended his campaign for the presidency two weeks prior, Dean won a majority of votes cast in the primary and received nine pledged delegates, topping the popular vote in nearly every county. John Kerry, who by this point had cemented his status as the frontunner for the nomination, finished second and won six delegates, placing first in the counties of Essex and Bennington. Although absent from the ballot, John Edwards received over six percent of the vote through write-ins.

2004 Vermont Democratic presidential primary
Candidate	Votes	%	Delegates
Howard Dean (withdrawn)	44,393	53.56	9
John Kerry	26,171	31.58	6
John Edwards (write-in)	5,113	6.17	
Dennis Kucinich	3,396	4.10	
Wesley Clark (withdrawn)	2,749	3.32	
Other write-ins	673	0.81	
Lyndon LaRouche	386	0.47	
Total	83,116	100%	15

=== Reactions ===
On the night of the primary, Howard Dean released a statement on his campaign website in which he thanked the voters of his home state for having "overwhelmingly endorsed" his "campaign for change."
