= 2004 Michigan Democratic presidential caucuses =

- February 7, 2004

128 pledged delegates to the 2004 Democratic National Convention
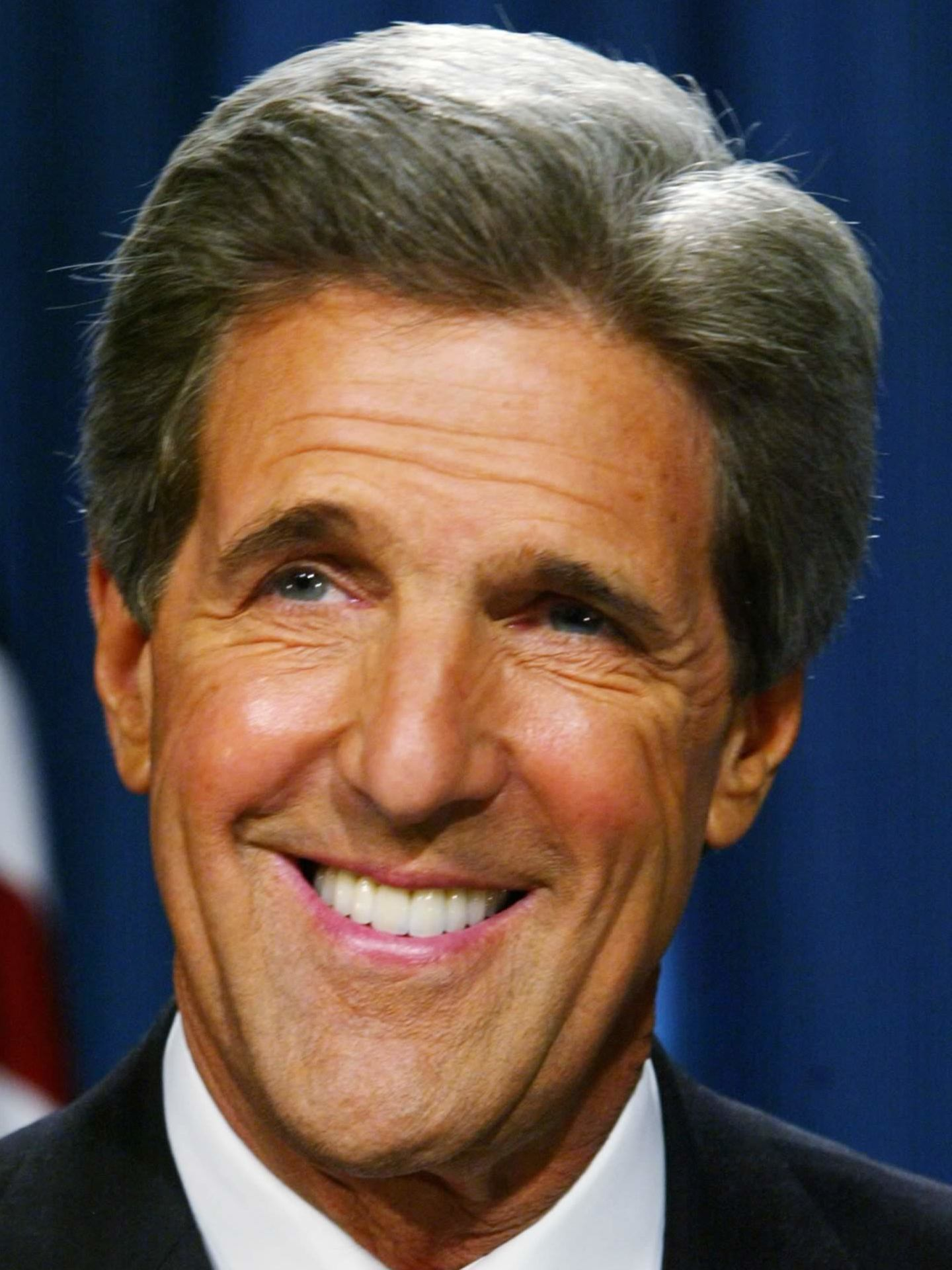

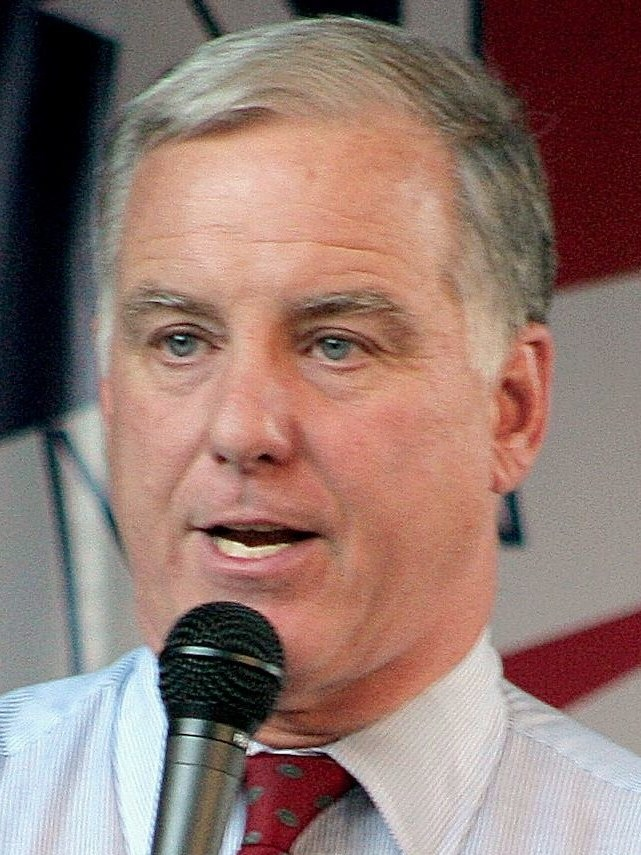

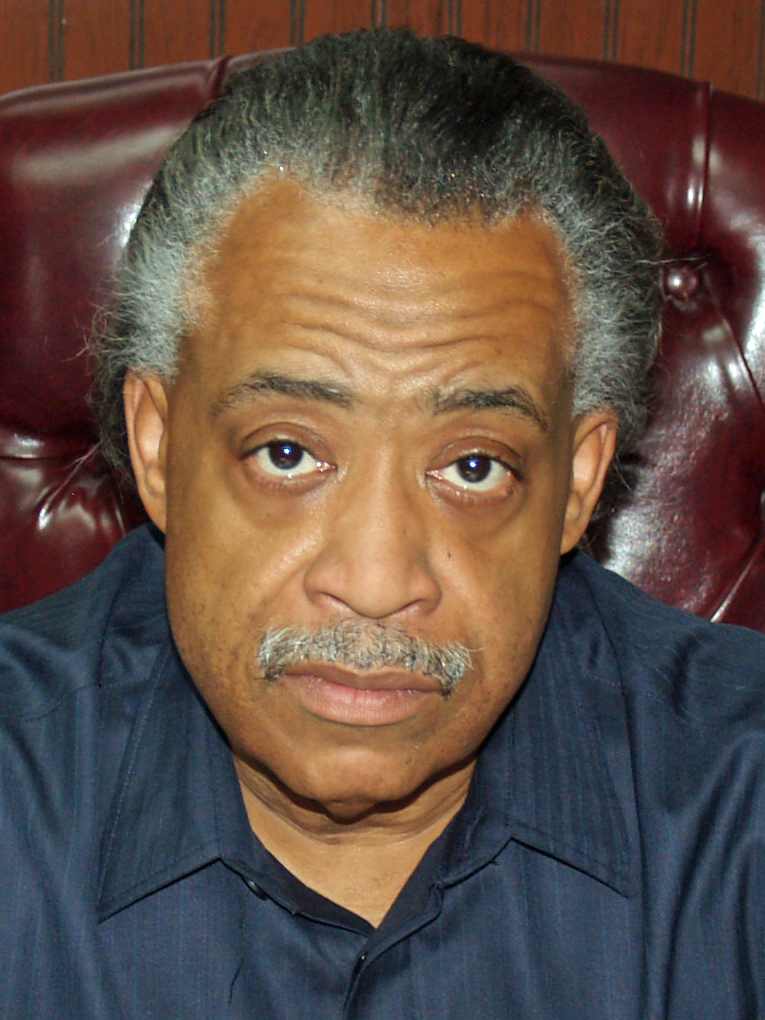

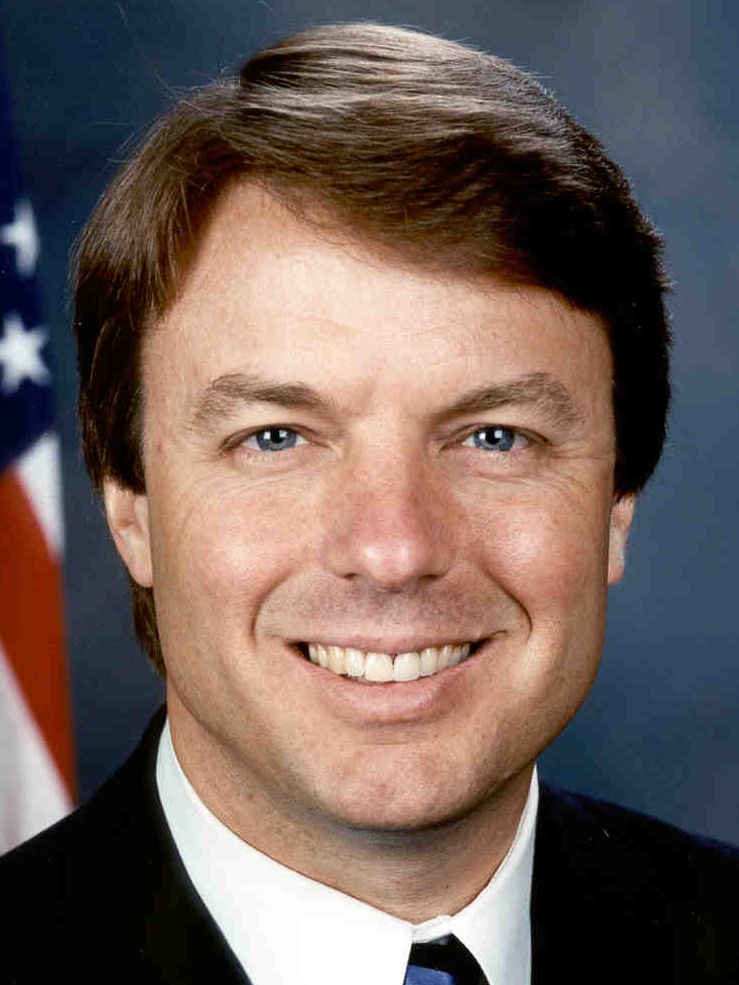

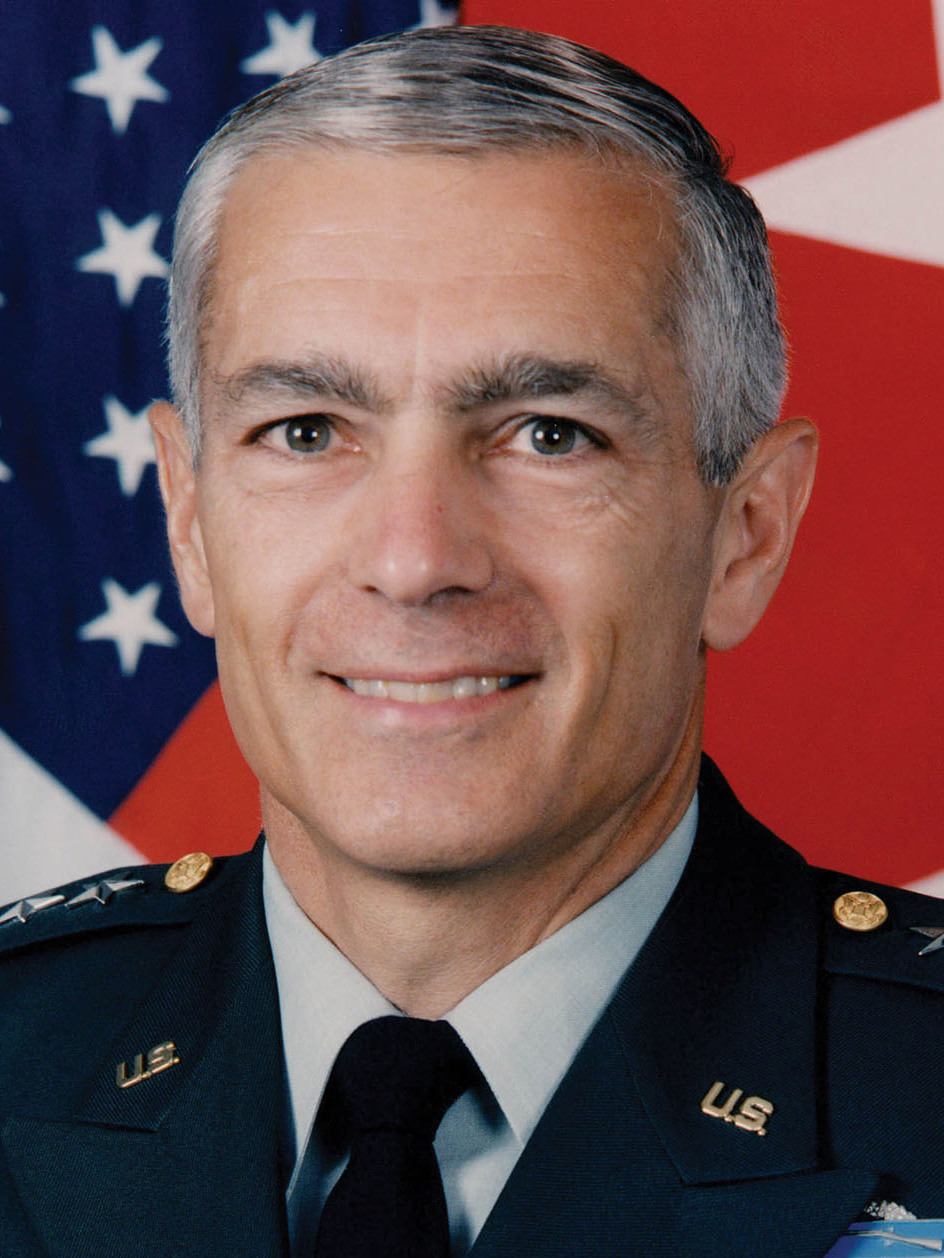
Candidate	John Kerry	Howard Dean	Al Sharpton
Home state	Massachusetts	Vermont	New York
Delegate count	93	24	7
Popular vote	84,818	27,025	11,404
Percentage	51.79%	16.50%	6.96%
Candidate	John Edwards	Wesley Clark
Home state	North Carolina	Arkansas
Delegate count	4	0
Popular vote	21,905	10,955
Percentage	13.38%	6.69%
- Election results by congressional district Kerry: 30–40% 40–50% 50–60%

The 2004 Michigan Democratic presidential caucuses were held on February 7, 2004, as part of the 2004 United States Democratic presidential primaries. Frontrunner John Kerry won the caucuses in a landslide victory.

== Results ==
2004 Michigan Democratic presidential caucuses
Candidate	Votes	%	Delegates
John Kerry	84,818	51.79	93
Howard Dean	27,025	16.50	24
Al Sharpton	11,404	6.96	7
John Edwards	21,905	13.38	4
Wesley Clark	10,955	6.69	0
Dennis Kucinich	5,258	3.21	0
Dick Gephardt (withdrawn)	951	0.58	0
Joe Lieberman (withdrawn)	659	0.40	0
Uncommitted	497	0.30	0
Carol Moseley Braun (withdrawn)	189	0.12	0
Write-ins	108	0.07	0
Total	163,769	100%	128
