= 2004 New Mexico Democratic presidential caucuses =

Senator John Kerry, the frontrunner for the nomination, won the 2004 New Mexico Caucus on Mini-Tuesday, February 3, 2004, by a landslide. 2 1/2 weeks ago before the election, third place finisher Howard Dean was leading former army general Wesley Clark 16% to 18%. Kerry got the endorsement of Lieutenant Governor of New Mexico Diane D. Denish. Wesley Clark got the most endorsements out of anyone. He got Mayor of Santa Fe Larry Delgado, candidate for offices Roberto A. Mondragon, congressional candidate Richard Romero and the Albuquerque Tribune. Governor Howard Dean got an endorsement from former Oklahoma senator Fred Harris and former governor Toney Anaya. Joe Lieberman yet again faced another disappointing showing in the primaries.

== Results ==
Candidate	No. State Delegates	Percentage	Potential National delegates
John Kerry	19,154	36.30	14
Wesley Clark	10,992	20.83	8
Howard Dean	9,416	17.84	4
John Edwards	5,410	10.25	0
Dennis Kucinich	2,427	4.60	0
Joe Lieberman	1,306	2.48	0
