= 2004 Oklahoma Democratic presidential primary =

- February 3, 2004

40 pledged delegates to the 2004 Democratic National Convention
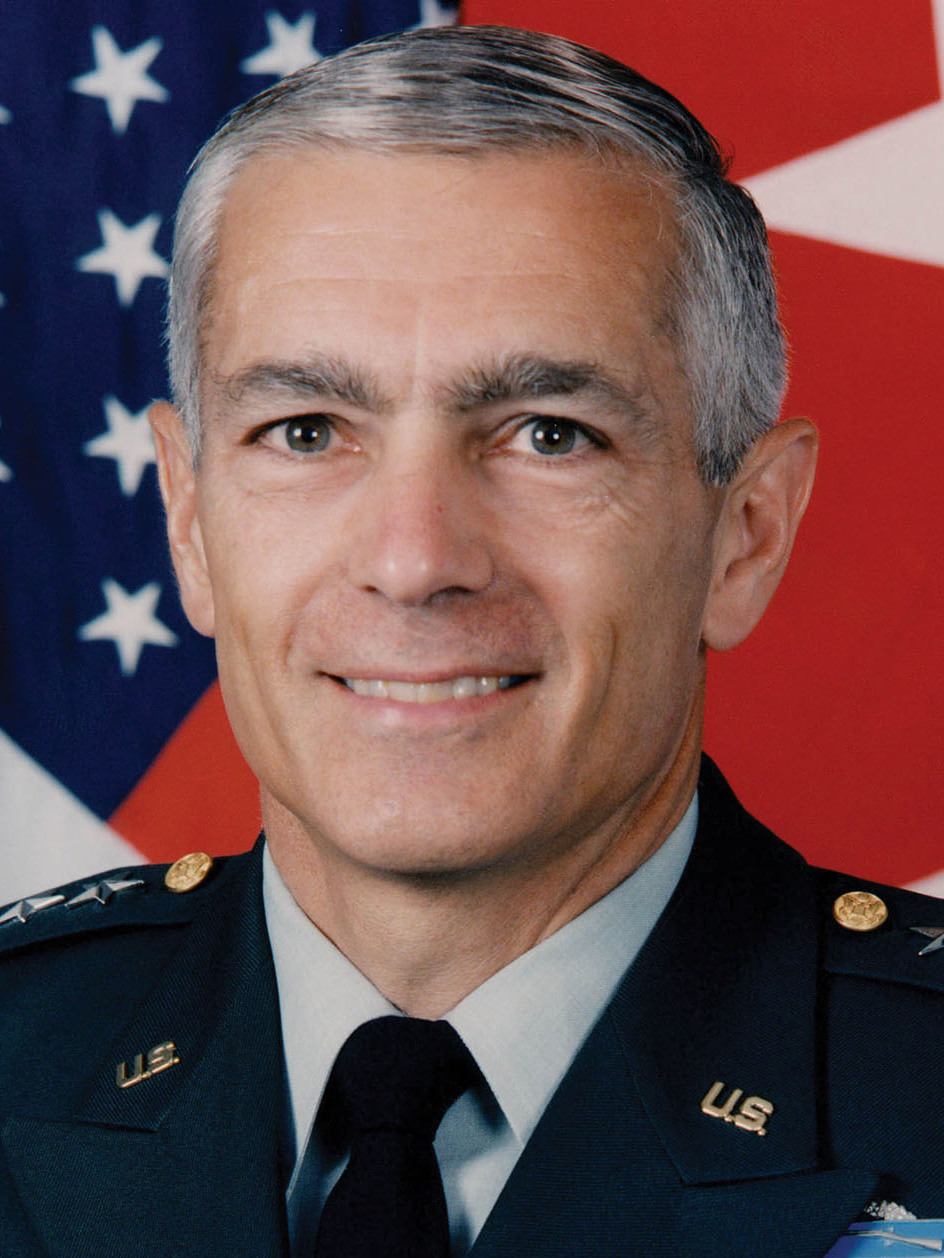

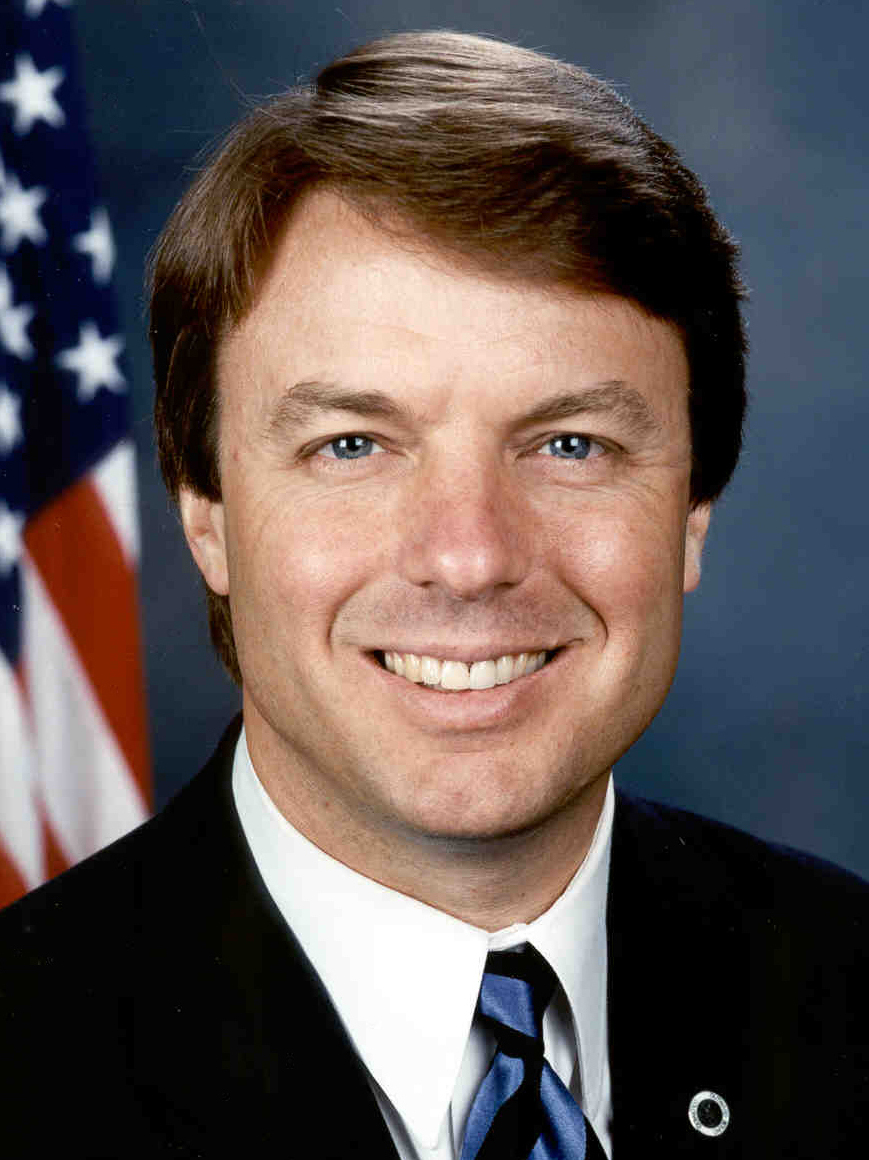

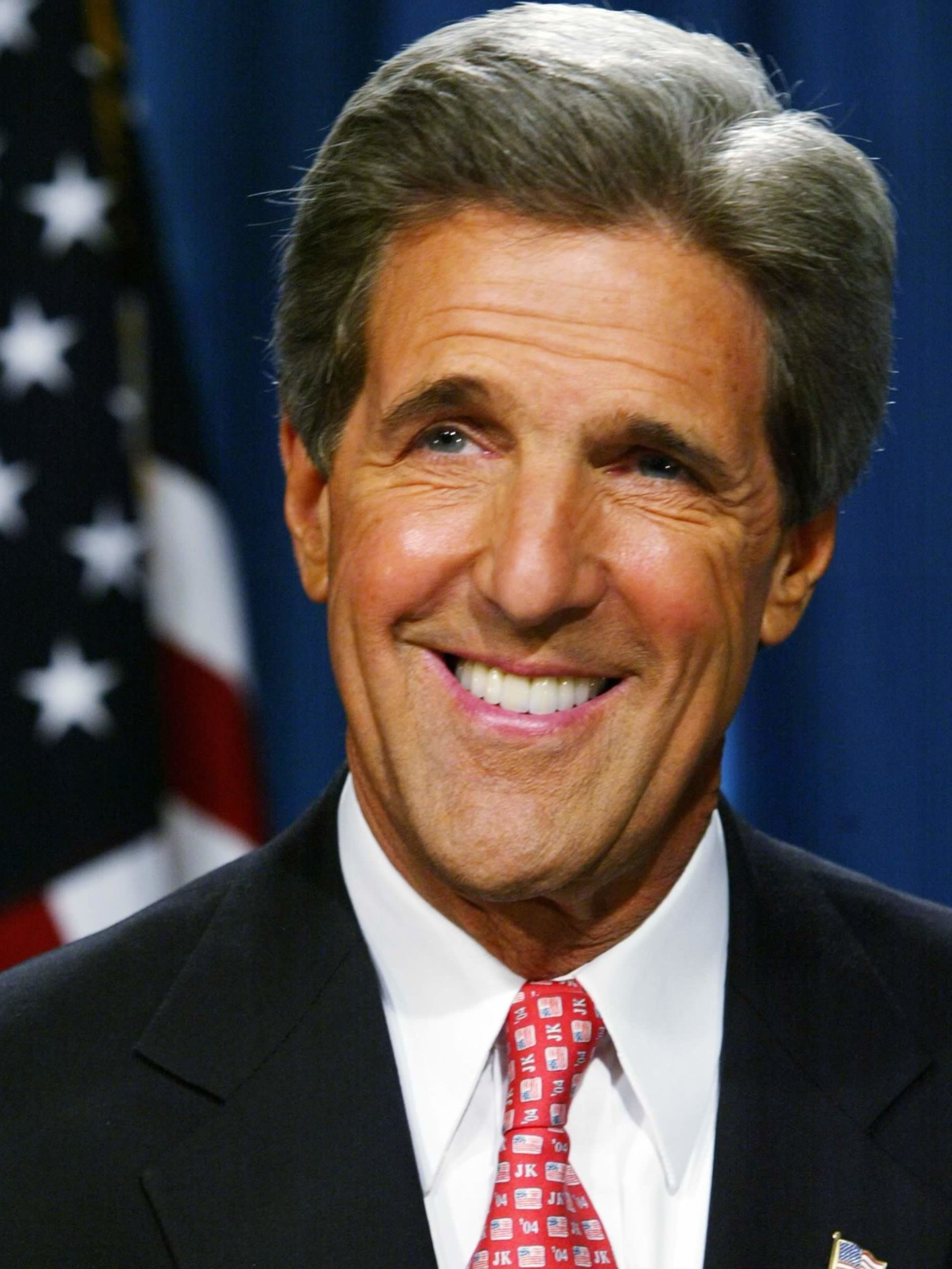

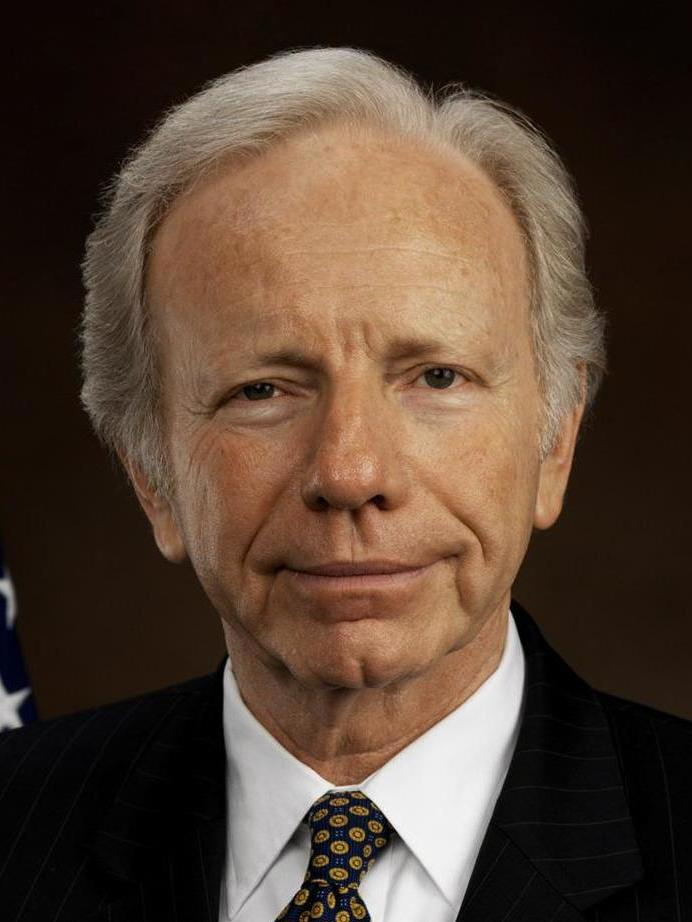
Candidate	Wesley Clark	John Edwards
Home state	Arkansas	North Carolina
Delegate count	15	13
Popular vote	90,526	89,310
Percentage	29.94%	29.54%
Candidate	John Kerry	Joe Lieberman
Home state	Massachusetts	Connecticut
Delegate count	12	0
Popular vote	81,073	19,680
Percentage	26.81%	6.51%
- County results Clark: 20-30% 30-40% 40-50% Edwards: 20-30% 30-40% 40-50% 50-60% Kerry: 20-30% 30-40%

The 2004 Oklahoma Democratic presidential primary, part of the process of selecting that party's nominee for President of the United States, took place on February 3, one of the seven nominating contests of 2004's "Mini-Tuesday". The primary election chose 40 pledged delegates to represent Oklahoma at the 2004 Democratic National Convention. The remainder of Oklahoma's 47 delegates consisted of unpledged superdelegates not bound by the results of the primary. The election was a closed primary, meaning that only registered Democrats could vote in this election. Wesley Clark won the primary by a razor-thin margin over John Edwards, making Oklahoma the only state to vote for Clark in the primary.

== Candidates ==
- General Wesley Clark of Arkansas
- Former Governor Howard Dean of Vermont
- Senator John Edwards of North Carolina
- Senator John Kerry of Massachusetts
- Representative Dennis Kucinich of Ohio
- Senator Joe Lieberman of Connecticut, 2000 Democratic Party vice-presidential candidate
- Reverend Al Sharpton of New York

=== Withdrawn ===
- Representative Dick Gephardt of Missouri, former House Minority Leader
- Former Senator and Ambassador Carol Moseley-Braun of Illinois

== Results ==
Key:	Withdrew prior to contest

2004 Oklahoma Democratic presidential primary
Candidate	Votes	Percentage	National delegates
Wesley Clark	90,526	29.94%	15
John Edwards	89,310	29.54%	13
John Kerry	81,073	26.81%	12
Joe Lieberman	19,680	6.51%	0
Howard Dean	12,734	4.21%	0
Al Sharpton	3,939	1.30%	0
Dennis Kucinich	2,544	0.84%	0
Dick Gephardt	1,890	0.63%	0
Lyndon LaRouche	689	0.23%	0
Totals	302,385	100.00%	40

== See also ==
- 2004 Oklahoma Republican presidential primary
