= 2004 Nevada Democratic presidential caucuses =

- February 14, 2004

32 Democratic National Convention delegates (24 pledged, 8 unpledged)
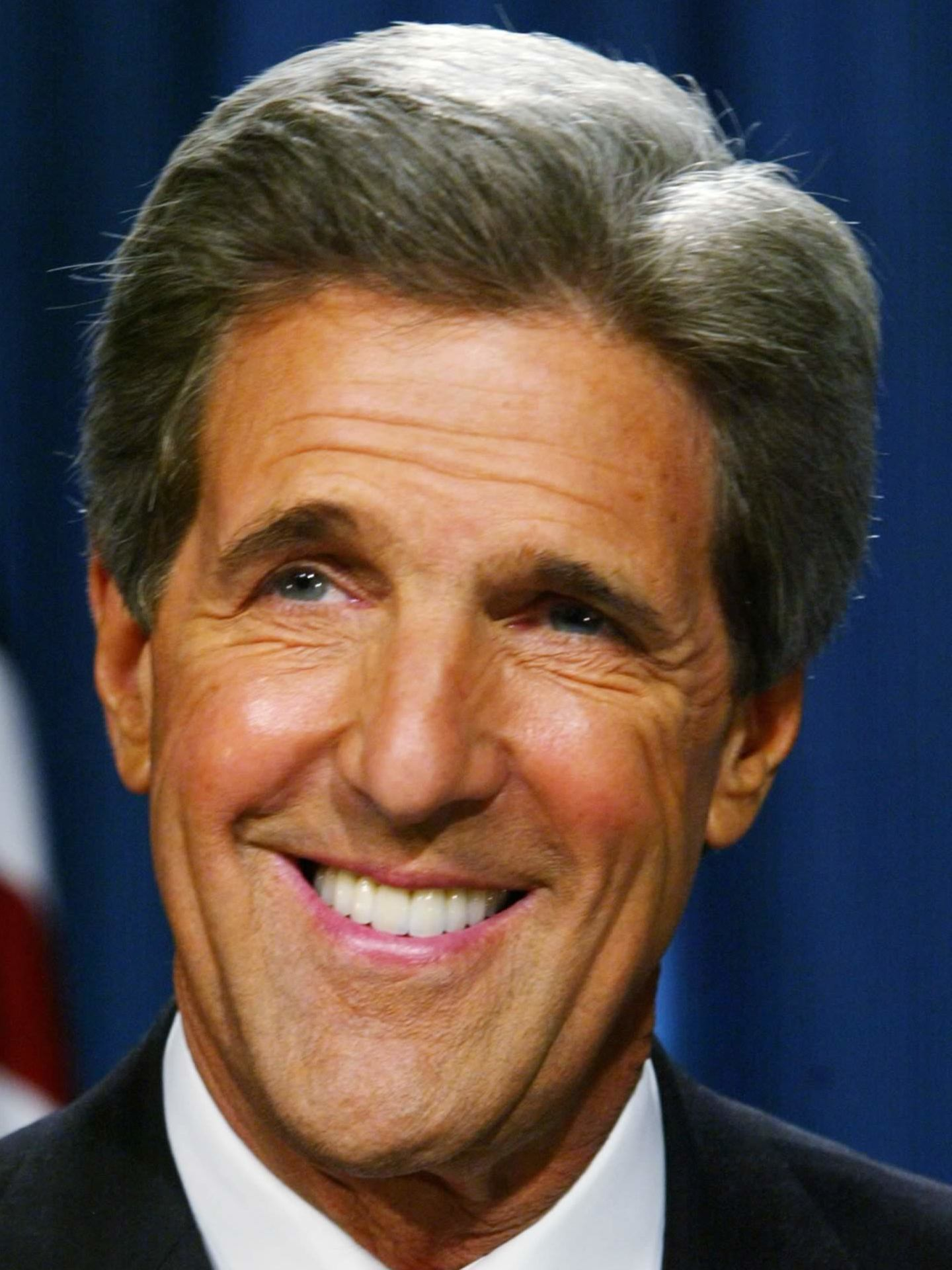

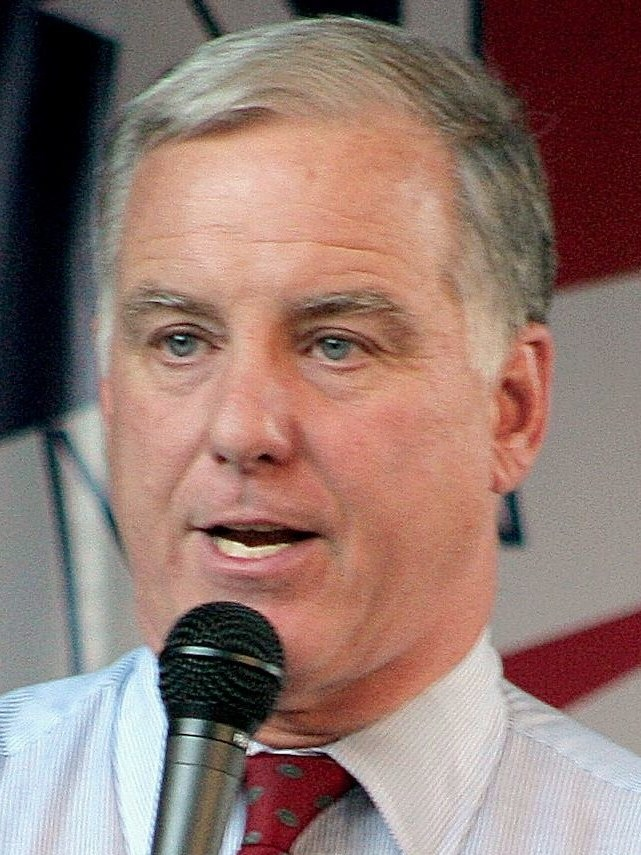

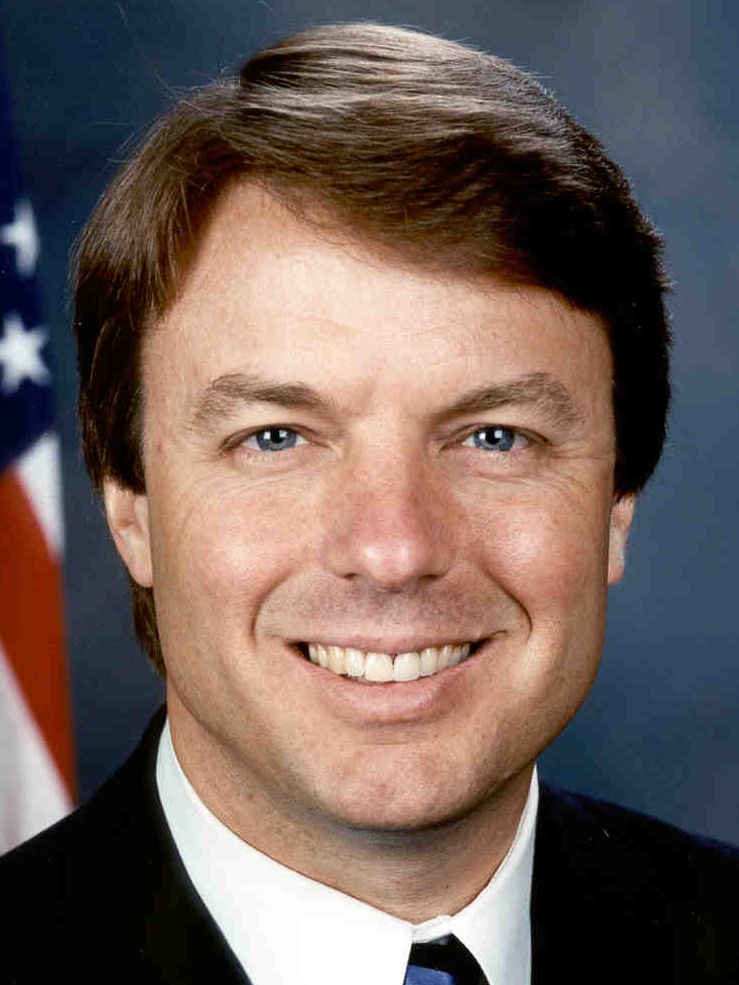

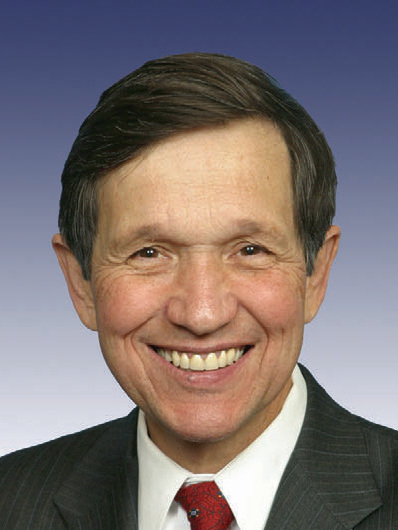
Candidate	John Kerry	Howard Dean
Home state	Massachusetts	Vermont
Delegate count	24	0
Popular vote	2,252	601
Percentage	64.49%	17.21%
Candidate	John Edwards	Dennis Kucinich
Home state	North Carolina	Ohio
Delegate count	0	0
Popular vote	373	241
Percentage	10.68%	6.90%

The 2004 Nevada Democratic presidential caucuses took place on February 14, 2004, as part of the 2004 United States Democratic presidential primaries. The delegate allocation is Proportional. The candidates were awarded delegates in proportion to the percentage of votes received and the caucus was open to registered Democrats only. A total of 20 delegates are awarded proportionally. A 15 percent threshold was required to receive delegates. Frontrunner John Kerry won the primary with Governor Howard Dean coming in a distant second. Kerry won the Democratic nomination for President of the United States, but lost the general election to incumbent George W. Bush.

== Statewide Results ==
United States presidential primary election in Nevada, 2004
Party	Candidate	Votes	Percentage	Delegates	
Democratic	John Kerry	2,252	64.5%	24	
Democratic	Howard Dean	601	17.2%	0	
Democratic	John Edwards	373	10.7%	0	
Democratic	Dennis Kucinich	241	6.9%	0	
Democratic	Al Sharpton	25	0.7%	0	
Totals		3,492	100%	100.00%	24
Voter turnout			%		—

== See also ==
- Democratic Party (United States) presidential primaries, 2004
