= 2004 Virginia Democratic presidential primary =

- February 10, 2004
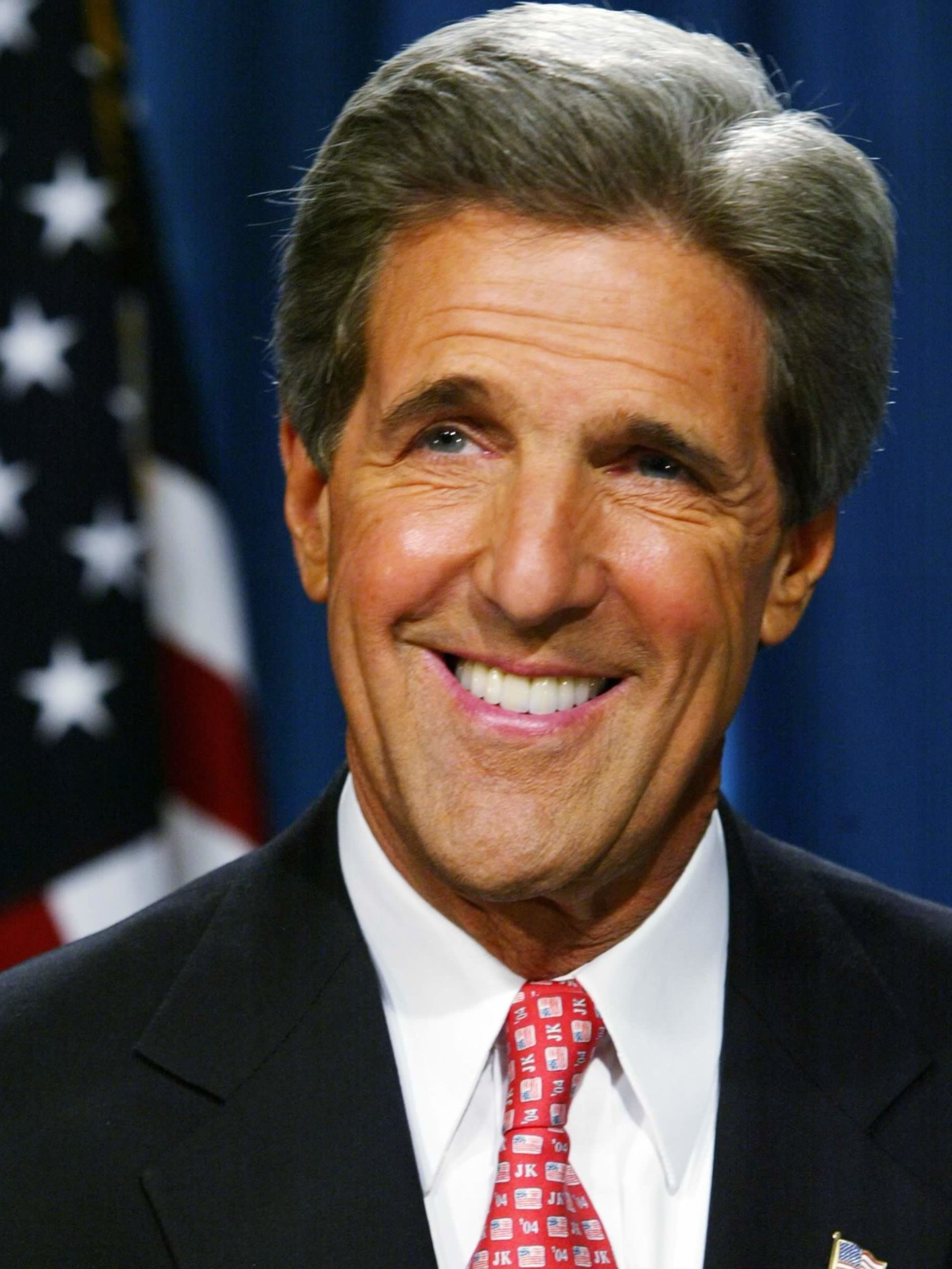

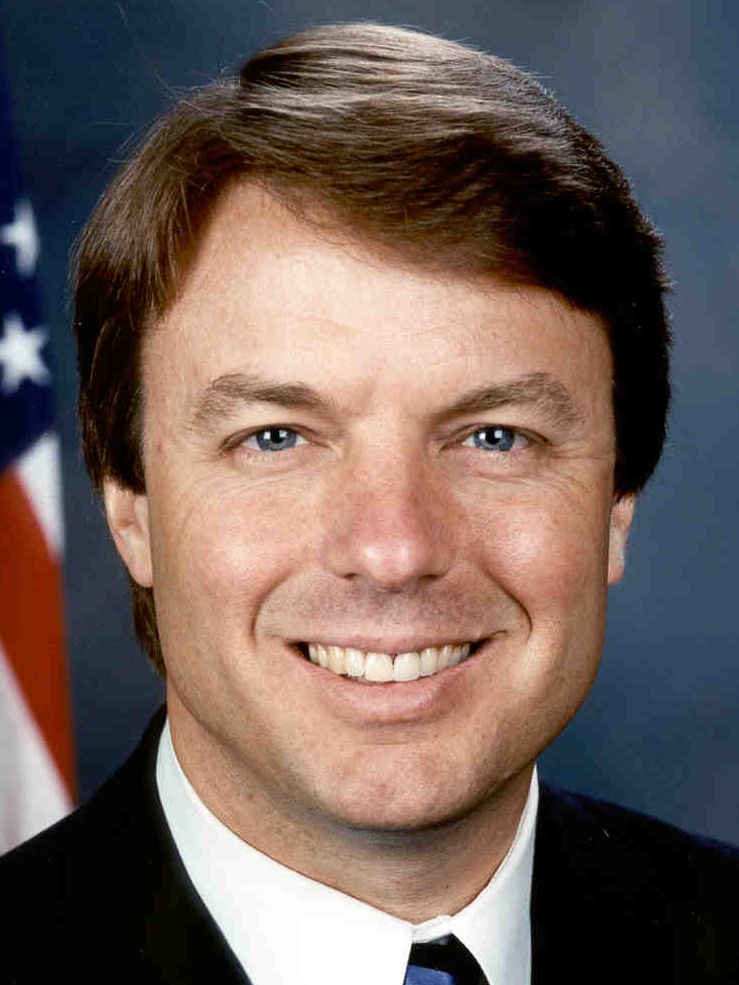

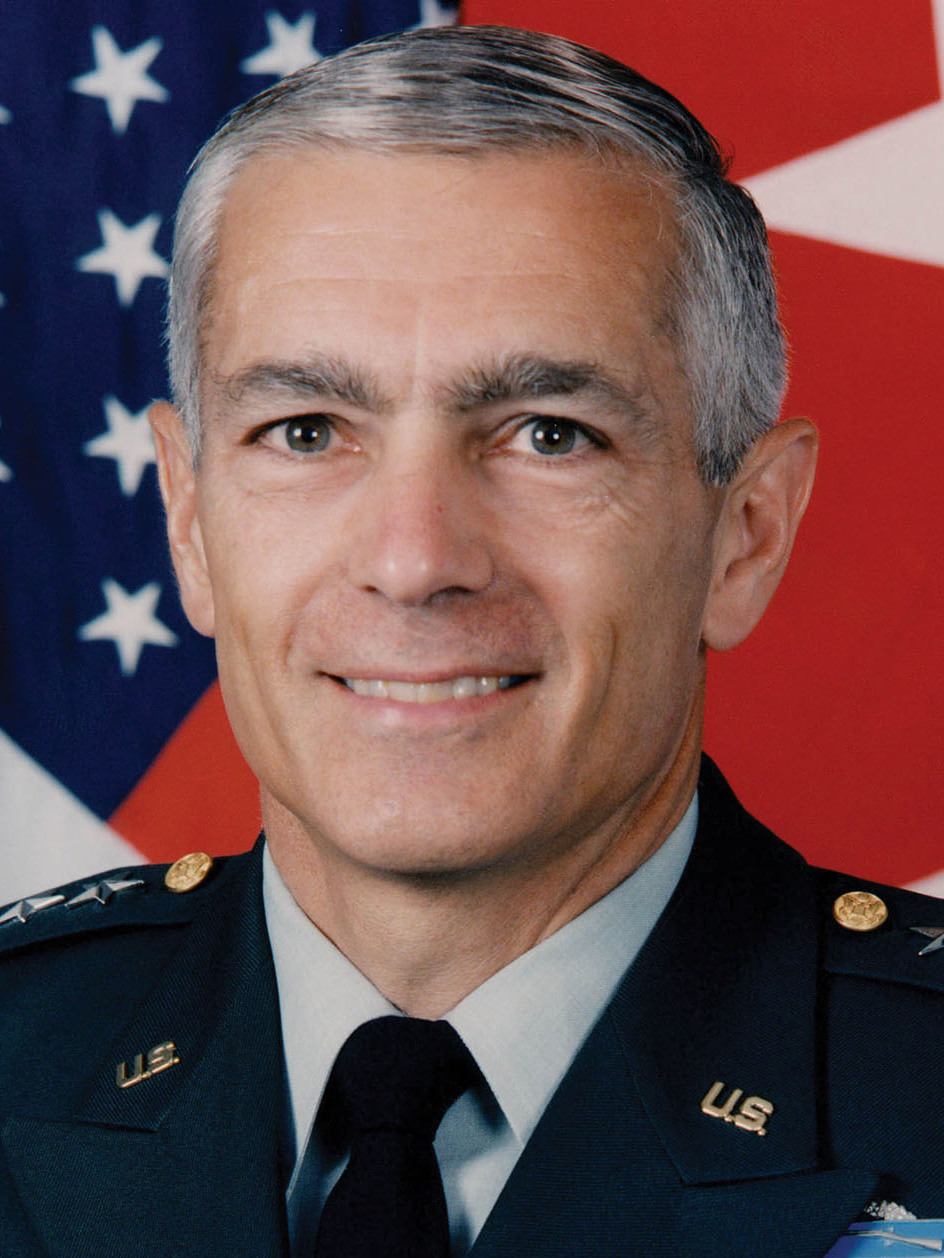

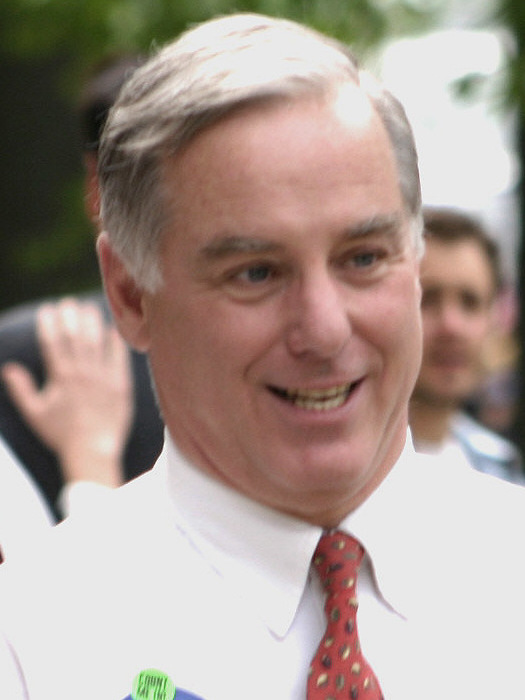
Candidate	John Kerry	John Edwards
Home state	Massachusetts	North Carolina
Delegate count	54	28
Popular vote	204,142	105,504
Percentage	51.5%	26.6%
Candidate	Wesley Clark	Howard Dean
Home state	Arkansas	Vermont
Delegate count	0	0
Popular vote	36,572	27,637
Percentage	9.2%	7.0%
- Primary results by county Kerry: 30-40% 40–50% 50–60% 60–70% Edwards: 40–50% 50–60%

The 2004 Virginia Democratic presidential primary took place on February 10, 2004 as part of the 2004 United States Democratic presidential primaries. The delegate allocation is proportional; the candidates are awarded delegates in proportion to the percentage of votes received and is open to anyone. A total of 82 (of 98) delegates are awarded proportionally. A 15 percent threshold is required to receive delegates. Frontrunner John Kerry won the primary with Senator John Edwards obtaining over 20% and receiving delegates.

Virginia Democratic presidential primary, 2004
Candidate	Votes	Percentage	Delegates
John Kerry	204,142	51.5%	54
John Edwards	105,504	26.6%	28
Wesley Clark	36,572	9.2%	0
Howard Dean	27,637	7.0%	0
Al Sharpton	12,864	3.3%	0
Dennis Kucinich	5,016	1.3%	0
Joe Lieberman	2,866	0.7%	0
Lyndon LaRouche	1,042	0.3%	0
Richard Gephardt	580	0.2%	0
Total	396,223	100.00%	82

== Analysis ==
Kerry won most of the counties and all the congressional districts in the state. His key to victory was winning Fairfax County, Virginia with almost 56% of the vote. Fairfax had by far the largest turnout in the state. Edwards won several counties in the southern portion of the state, including his best performance in Wythe County, which he won with almost 58%. Clark's best performance was by far in Lynchburg City, which he obtained almost 24% of the vote. Dean's strongest performance was in Albemarle County, where he obtained almost 12% of the vote.
