= 2004 Delaware Democratic presidential primary =

- February 3, 2004

23 Democratic National Convention delegates (15 pledged, 8 unpledged) The number of pledged delegates received is determined by the popular vote
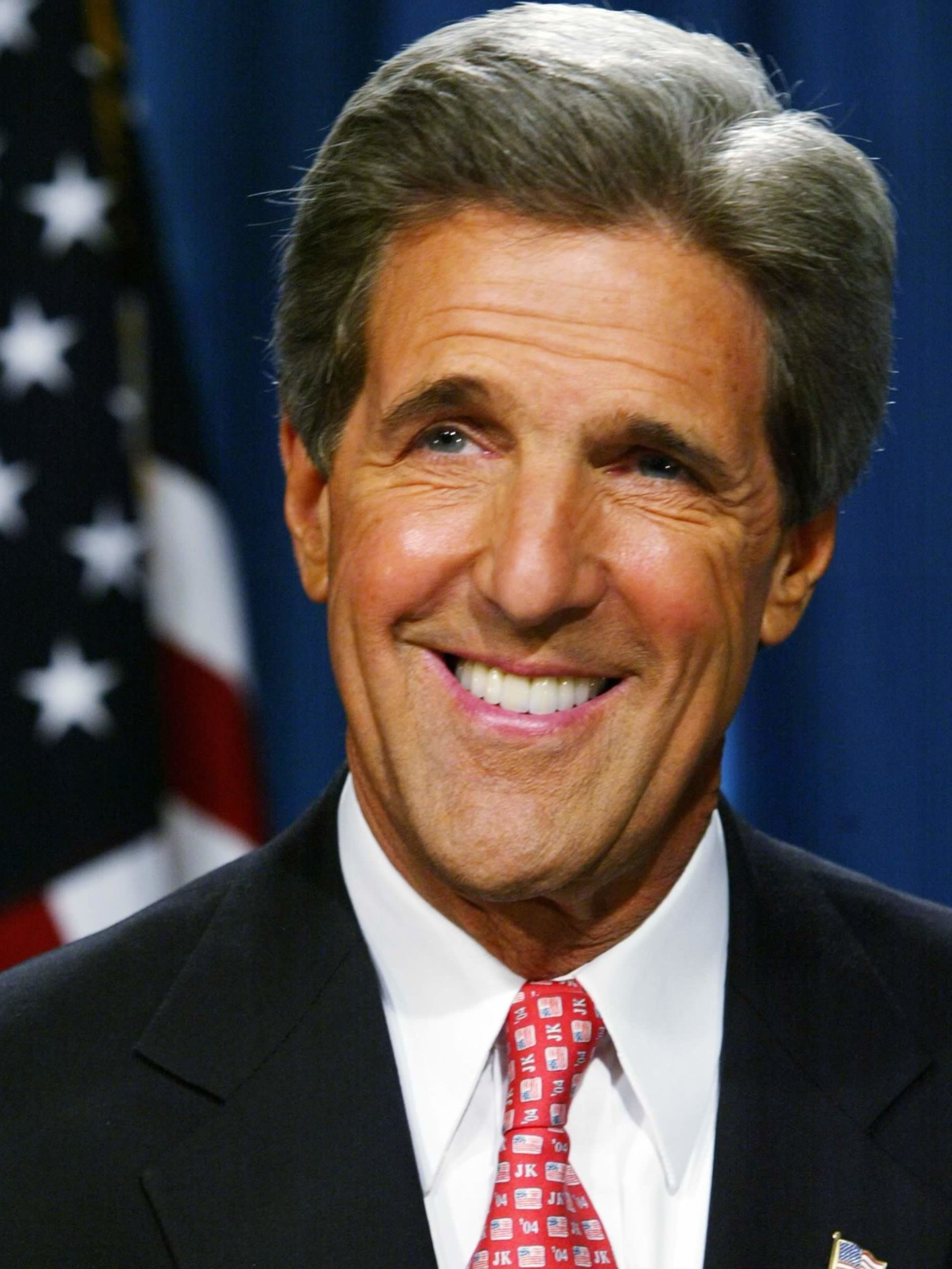

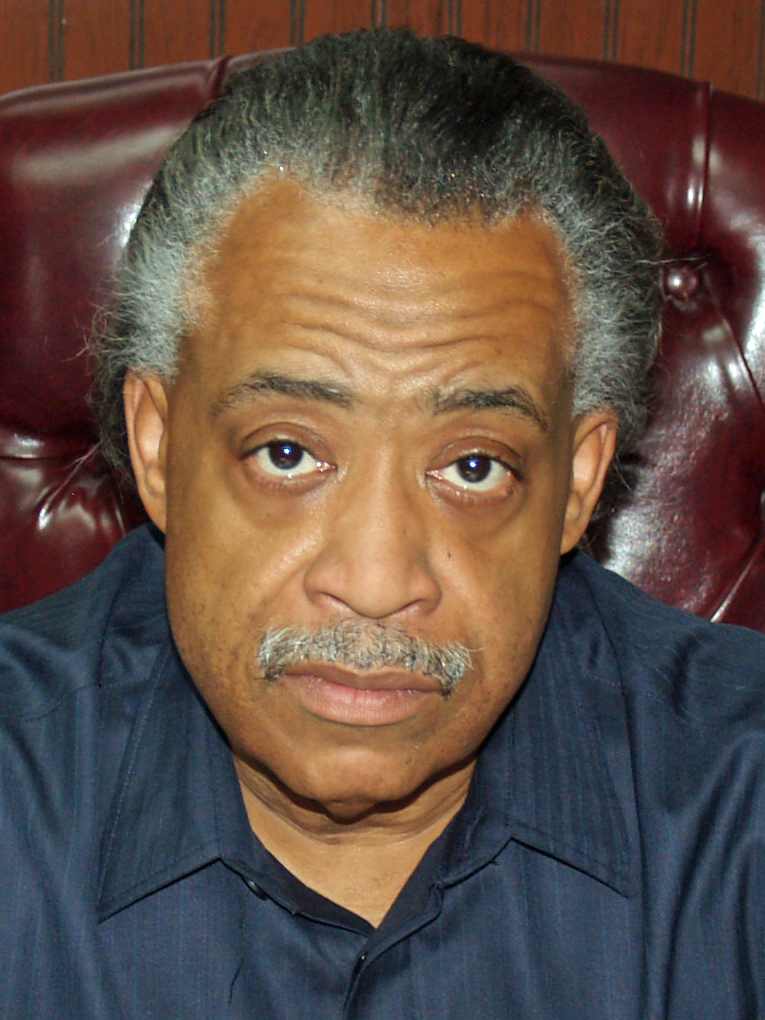

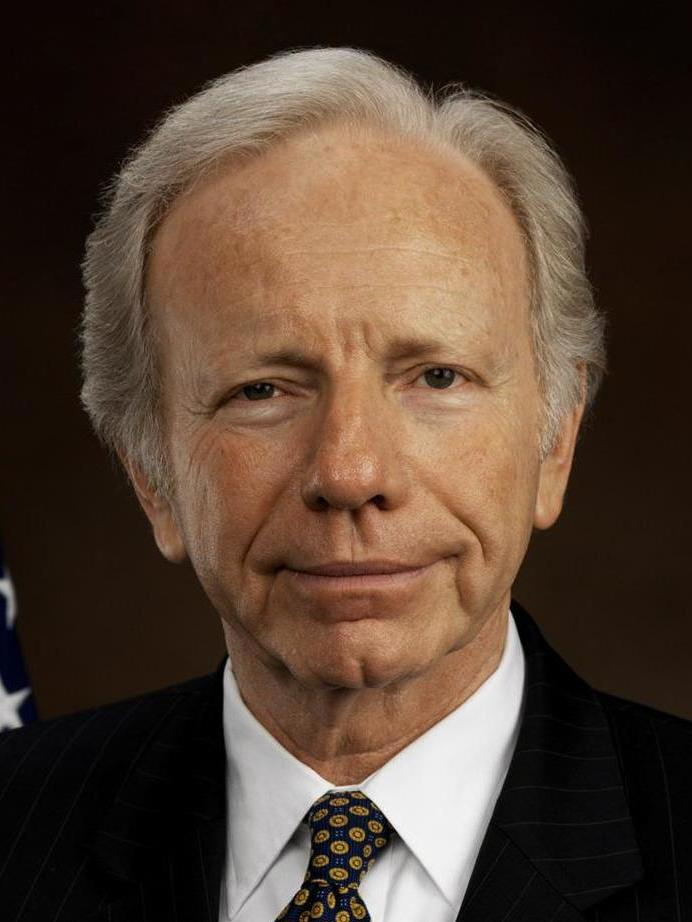

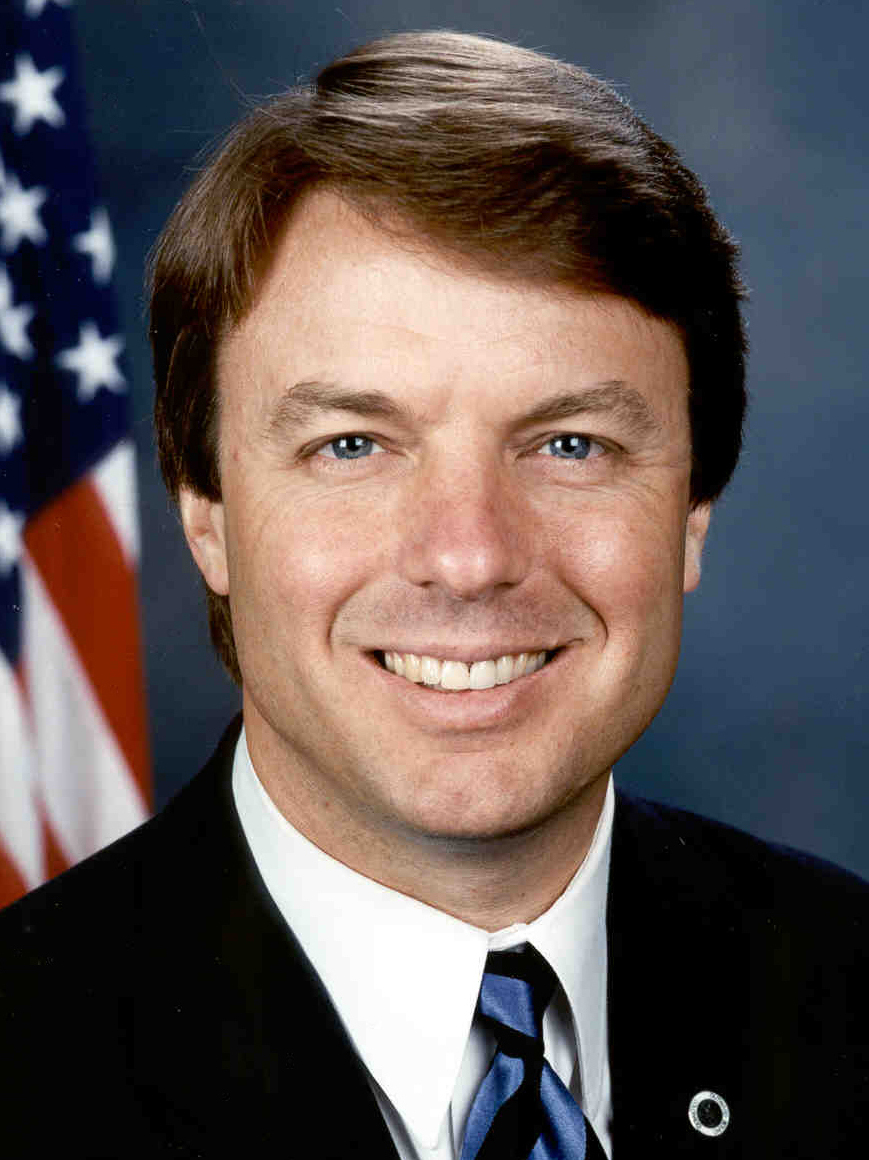

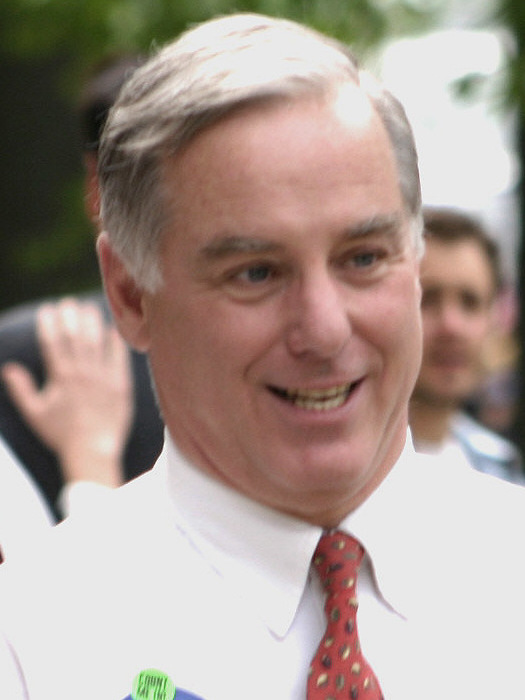

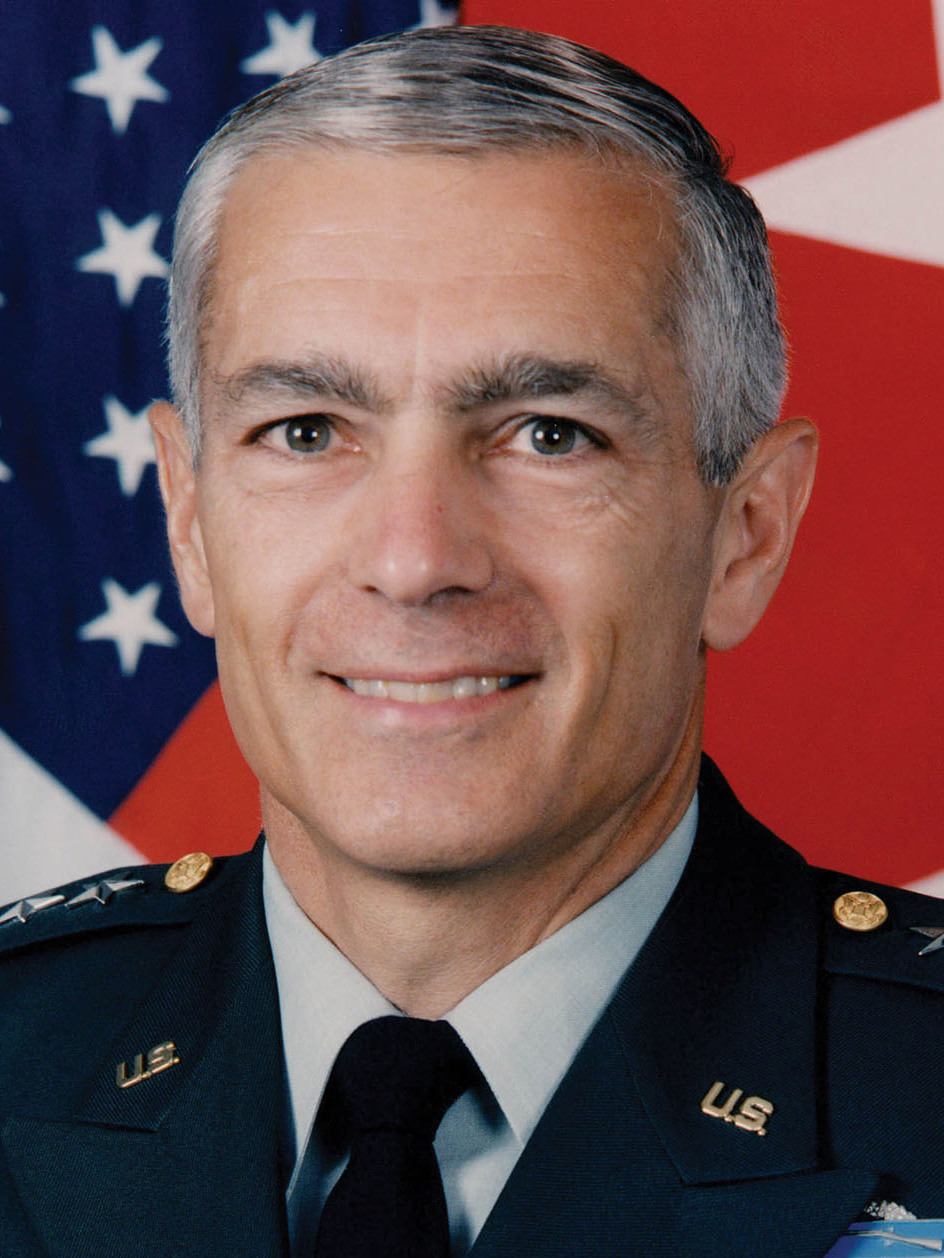
| Candidate | John Kerry | Al Sharpton | Joe Lieberman |
| Home state | Massachusetts | New York | Connecticut |
| Delegate count | 14 | 1 | 0 |
| Popular vote | 16,787 | 1,888 | 3,706 |
| Percentage | 50.43% | 5.67% | 11.13% |
| Candidate | John Edwards | Howard Dean | Wesley Clark |
| Home state | North Carolina | Vermont | Arkansas |
| Delegate count | 0 | 0 | 0 |
| Popular vote | 3,674 | 3,462 | 3,165 |
| Percentage | 11.04% | 10.40% | 9.51% |
- County results Kerry 40–50% 50–60%

The 2004 Delaware Democratic presidential primary was held on February 3, 2004 as part of the 2004 United States Democratic presidential primaries. Frontrunner John Kerry easily won the primary while Senator Joe Lieberman came second.

As the primary approached Joe Lieberman said that victory in the Delaware primary was required in order for his campaign to continue. He had visited the state four times and got the endorsement of Democratic senator Thomas R. Carper. After his defeat in the primary Lieberman withdrew from the race for the nomination.

Exit polls showed that over half of voters who took part in the primary said they were 'angry' with the administration of George W. Bush and over 80% said they opposed the decision to go to war with Iraq.

== Polling ==
Polling for the 2004 Democratic Primary
| Candidate | 29 January 2004 |
|---|---|
| John Kerry | 27% |
| Joe Lieberman | 16% |
| Howard Dean | 14% |
| John Edwards | 9% |
| Wesley Clark | 8% |
| Dennis Kucinich | 1% |
| Al Sharpton | 1% |

== Results ==
2004 Delaware Democratic presidential primary
| Candidate | Votes | % | Delegates |
| John Kerry | 16,787 | 50.43% | 14 |
| Joe Lieberman | 3,706 | 11.13% | 0 |
| John Edwards | 3,674 | 11.04% | 0 |
| Howard Dean | 3,674 | 10.40% | 0 |
| Wesley Clark | 3,165 | 9.51% | 0 |
| Al Sharpton | 1,888 | 5.67% | 1 |
| Dennis Kucinich | 344 | 1.03% | 0 |
| Richard Gephardt (withdrawn) | 187 | 0.56% | 0 |
| Lyndon LaRouche | 78 | 0.23% | 0 |
| Total | 33,291 | 100% | 15 |
