= 2004 Washington Democratic presidential caucuses =

- February 7, 2004

76 pledged delegates to the 2004 Democratic National Convention
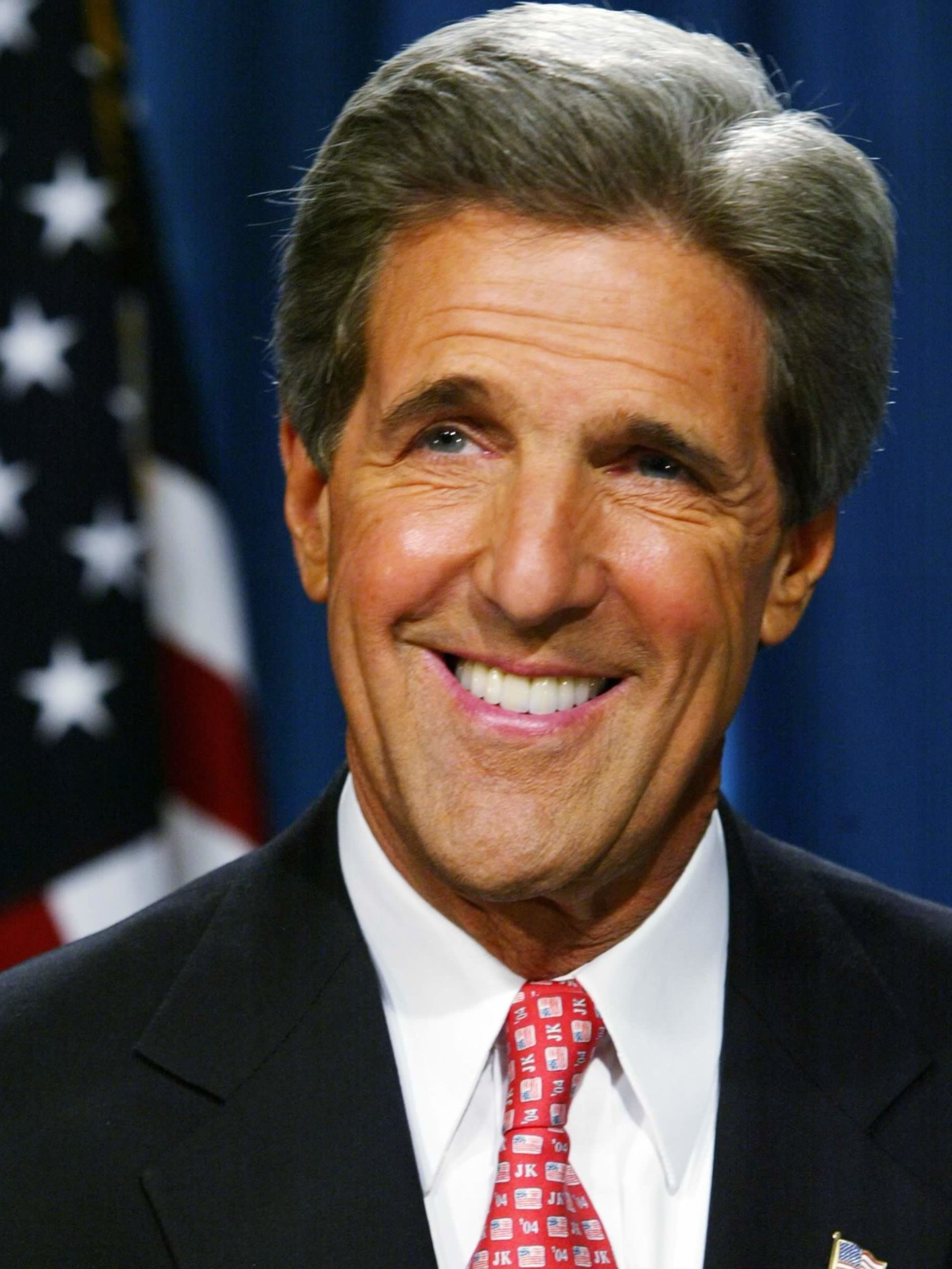

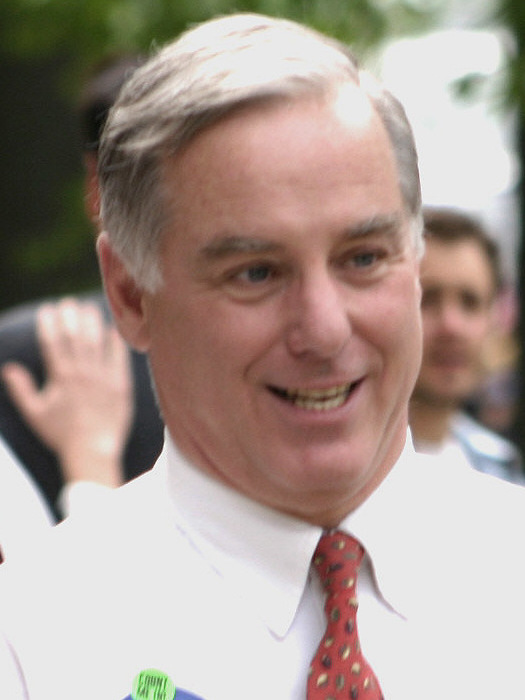

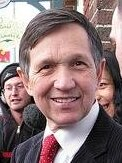

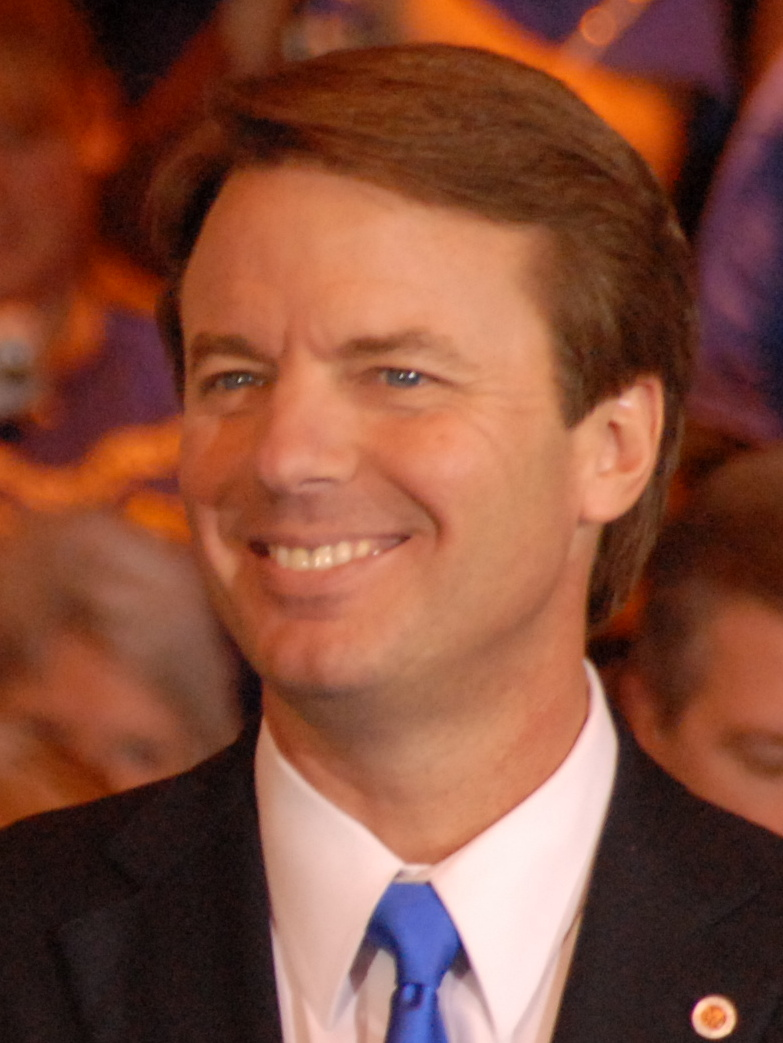
Candidate	John Kerry	Howard Dean
Home state	Massachusetts	Vermont
Delegate count	46	24
Popular vote	11,397	7,060
Percentage	48.41%	29.99%
Candidate	Dennis Kucinich	John Edwards
Home state	Ohio	North Carolina
Delegate count	6	0
Popular vote	1,927	1,571
Percentage	8.19%	6.67%

The 2004 Washington Democratic presidential caucuses were held on February 7, 2004. The Caucus is open to registered Democrats and Independents. The delegate allocation is proportional, the candidates are awarded delegates in proportion to the percentage of votes received. A total of 76 (of 95) delegates are awarded proportionally. A 15 percent threshold is required to receive delegates. No actual convention delegates are awarded at the caucuses, rather each precinct caucus chooses delegates to attend the County Convention.

== Analysis ==
This election caucus was immediately following Super Tuesday, where John Kerry dominated and continued his momentum. Kerry won the blue state of Washington with 48% of the vote, winning every county and congressional district except for the 7th district, which Dean carried with just under 40%. Turnout was overall very low in the state. The highest turnout by far was when over 9,500 people showed to vote in King County, Washington, where Kerry won with 44%. Kerry's weakest performance in the state was in Jefferson County, Washington, where he got just 39% of the vote, and Howard Dean got 31% of the vote

== Statewide Results ==
Primary date: February 7, 2004

2004 Washington Democratic presidential primary
Candidate	Votes	Percentage	Delegates
John Kerry	11,397	48.41%	46
Howard Dean	7,060	29.99%	24
Dennis Kucinich	1,927	8.19%	6
John Edwards	1,571	6.67%	0
Uncommitted	799	3.39%	0
Wesley Clark	768	3.26%	0
Al Sharpton	19	0.08%	0
Total	23,541	100.00%	76

== Sources ==
Dave Leip's U.S. Election Atlas
