= 2004 South Carolina Democratic presidential primary =

- February 3, 2004

45 pledged delegates to the 2004 Democratic National Convention
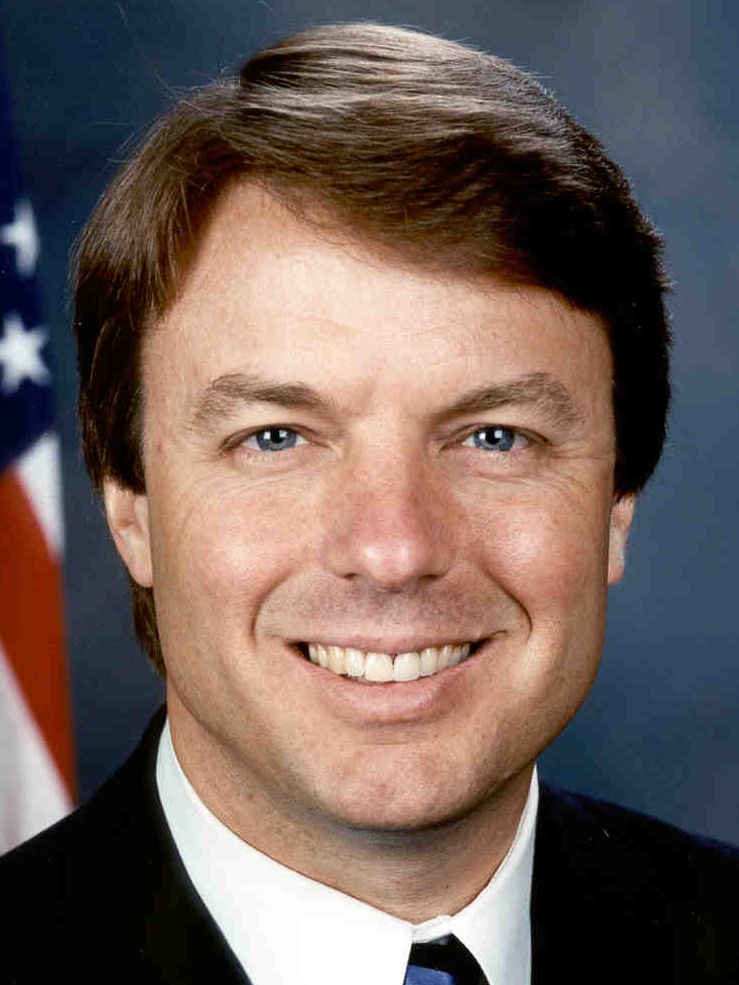

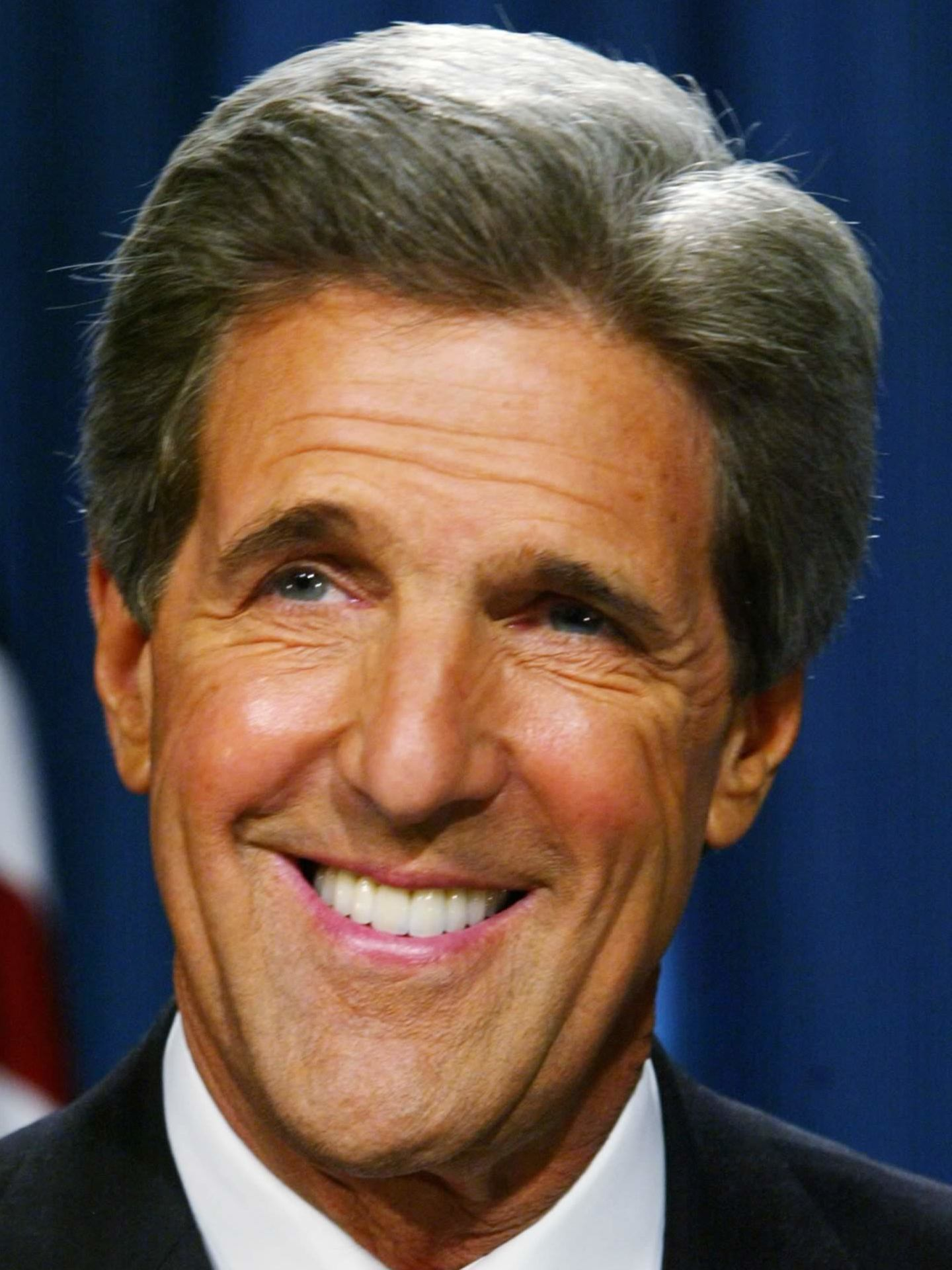

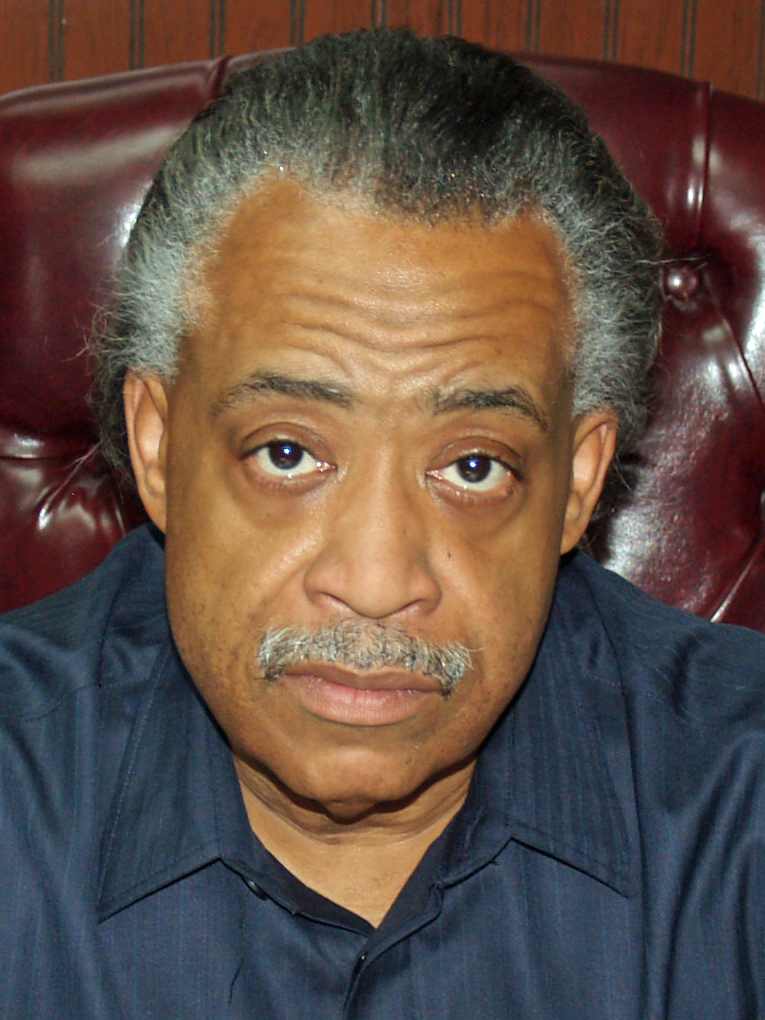

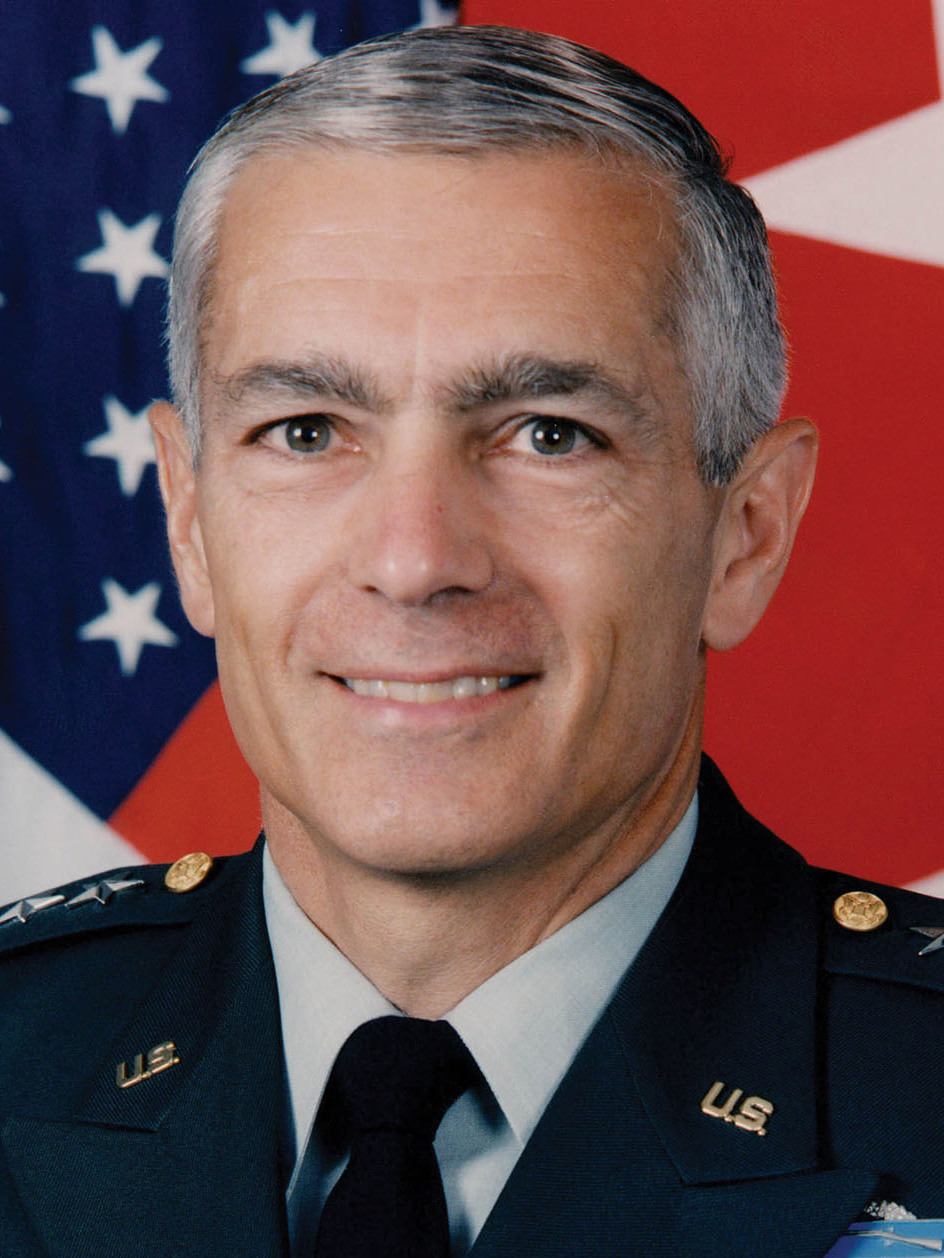
Nominee	John Edwards	John Kerry
Home state	North Carolina	Massachusetts
Delegate count	28	17
Popular vote	131,174	88,508
Percentage	44.86%	30.27%
Nominee	Al Sharpton	Wesley Clark
Home state	New York	Arkansas
Delegate count	0	0
Popular vote	28,201	21,011
Percentage	9.65%	7.19%
- Election results by county. Red denotes counties won by Edwards, and Blue denotes those won by Kerry.

The 2004 South Carolina Democratic presidential primary took place on February 3, 2004. It was the first primary in a Southern state and the first primary in a state in which African Americans make up a sizable percentage of the electorate.

The Democratic primary was held on February 3, with 45 delegates at stake. It was held on the same day as six other primaries and caucuses.

South Carolina's 45 delegates to the 2004 Democratic National Convention were awarded proportionally based on the results of the primary. The state also sent ten superdelegates.

As of the 2024 presidential election, this is the last time, in a non-incumbent Democratic primary, that the winner of South Carolina did not win the nomination.

== Candidates ==
- General Wesley Clark of Arkansas
- Former Governor Howard Dean of Vermont
- Senator John Edwards of North Carolina
- Senator John Kerry of Massachusetts
- Representative Dennis Kucinich of Ohio
- Senator Joe Lieberman of Connecticut, 2000 Democratic Party vice-presidential candidate
- Reverend Al Sharpton of New York

==== Withdrawn ====
- Representative Dick Gephardt of Missouri, former House minority leader
- Former Senator and Ambassador Carol Moseley-Braun of Illinois

== Results ==
Key:	Withdrew prior to contest

South Carolina Democratic presidential primary, 2004
Candidate	Votes	Percentage	National delegates
John Edwards	131,174	44.86%	28
John Kerry	88,508	30.27%	17
Al Sharpton	28,201	9.65%	0
Wesley Clark	21,011	7.19%	0
Howard Dean	13,815	4.72%	0
Joe Lieberman	7,147	2.44%	0
Dennis Kucinich	1,319	0.45%	0
Dick Gephardt	631	0.22%	0
Carol Moseley-Braun	577	0.20%	0
Totals	292,383	100.00%	45
