= 2004 Wisconsin Democratic presidential primary =

- February 17, 2004

87 delegates to the 2004 Democratic National Convention (72 pledged, 15 unpledged)
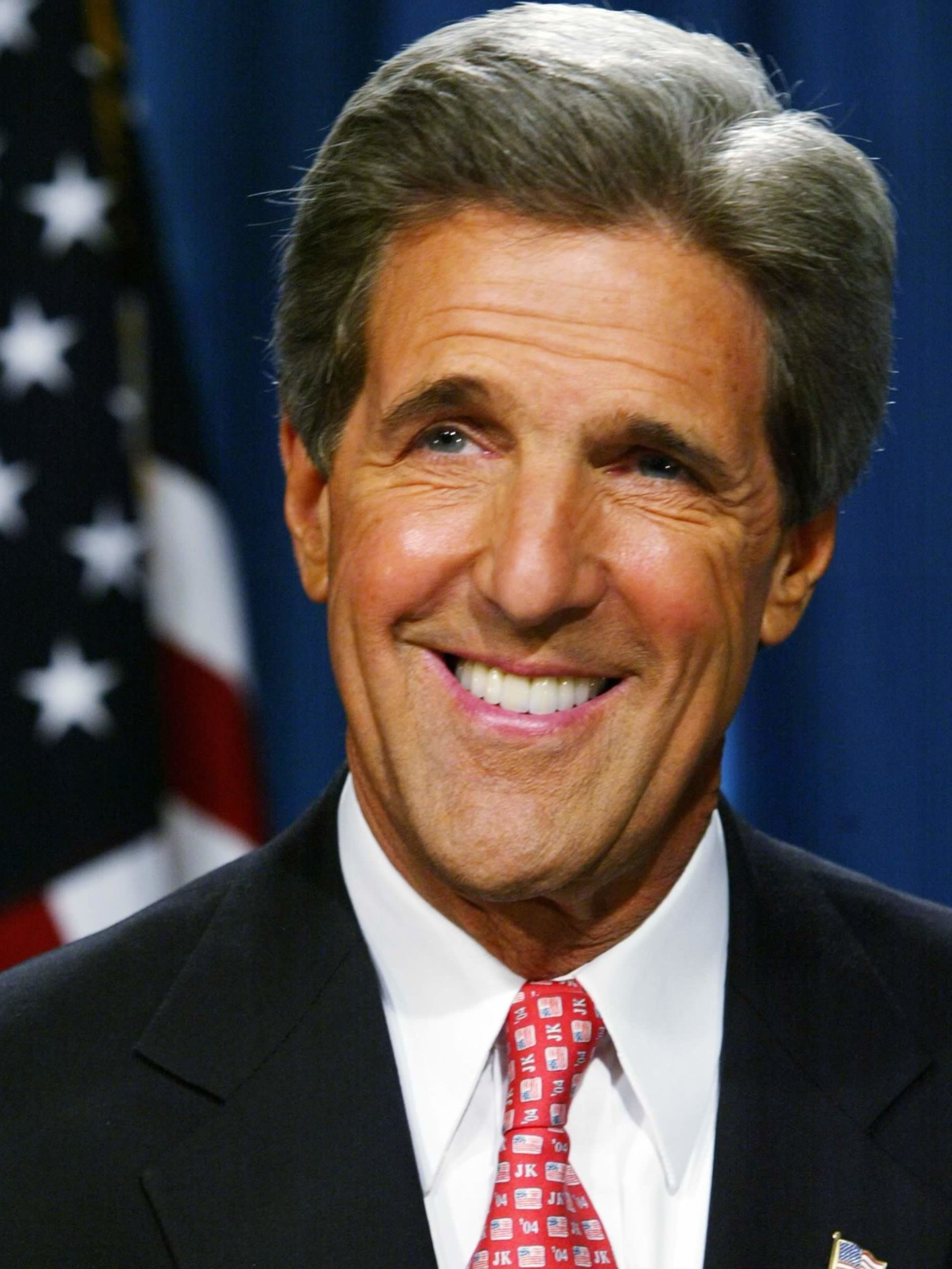

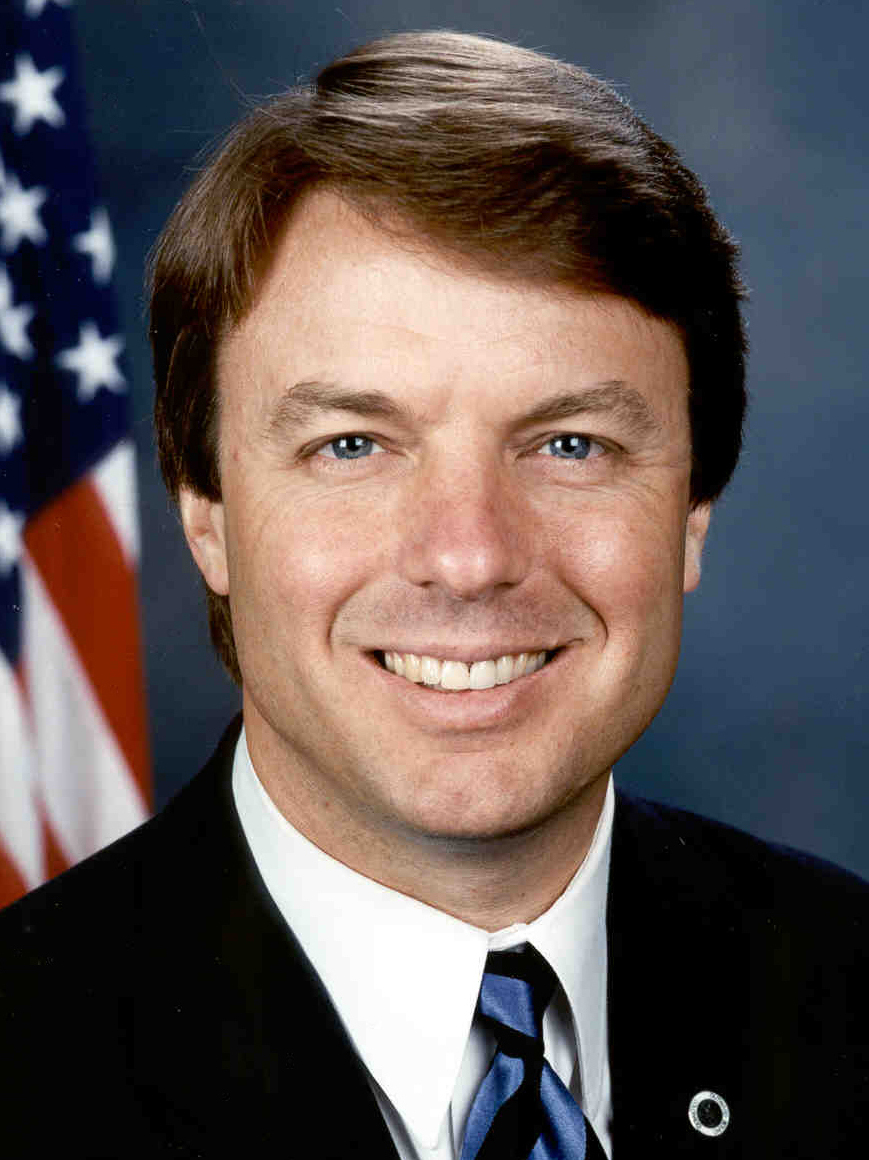

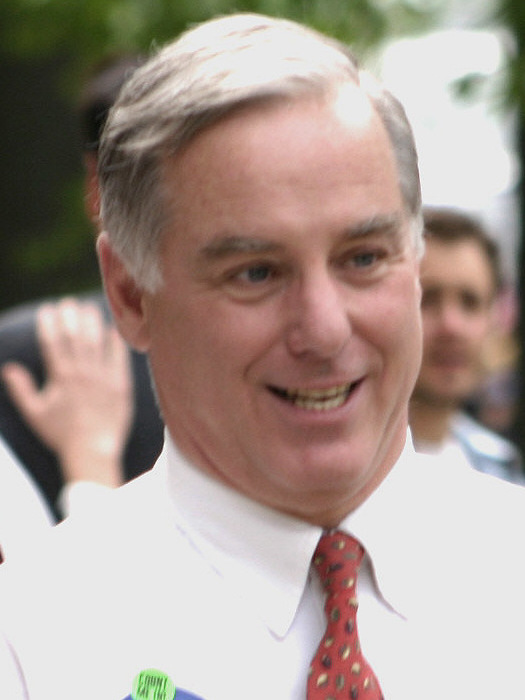
| Candidate | John Kerry | John Edwards | Howard Dean |
| Home state | Massachusetts | North Carolina | Vermont |
| Delegate count | 32 | 26 | 14 |
| Popular vote | 328,358 | 284,163 | 150,845 |
| Percentage | 39.64% | 34.30% | 18.21% |
- County results Kerry: 30-40% 40-50% 50-60% 60-70% Edwards: 30-40% 40-50% Tie: 30-40%

The 2004 Wisconsin Democratic presidential primary took place on February 17, 2004 as part of the 2004 Democratic Party presidential primaries. The delegate allocation is Proportional. The candidates are awarded delegates in proportion to the percentage of votes received and is open to registered Democrats only. A total of 72 (of 87) delegates are awarded proportionally. A 15 percent threshold is required to receive delegates. John Kerry won the primary with John Edwards coming in second.

== Results ==
2004 United States presidential primary election in Wisconsin
| Party | Candidate | Votes | Percentage | Delegates | |
|---|---|---|---|---|---|
| Democratic | John Kerry | 328,358 | 39.6% | 32 | |
| Democratic | John Edwards | 284,163 | 34.3% | 26 | |
| Democratic | Howard Dean | 150,845 | 18.2% | 14 | |
| Democratic | Dennis Kucinich | 27,353 | 3.3% | 0 | |
| Democratic | Al Sharpton | 14,701 | 1.8% | 0 | |
| Democratic | Wesley Clark | 12,713 | 1.5% | 0 | |
| Democratic | Joe Lieberman | 3,929 | 0.5% | 0 | |
| Democratic | Lyndon LaRouche | 1,637 | 0.2% | 0 | |
| Democratic | Carol Moseley-Braun | 1,590 | 0.2% | 0 | |
| Democratic | Dick Gephardt | 1,263 | 0.2% | 0 | |
| Totals | | | 100.00% | 72 | |
| Voter turnout | | | % | | — |

== Analysis ==
Although Kerry was gaining momentum, he won Wisconsin with just 39.6% of the vote and won with a margin of slightly over 5%. Edwards did very well in the state, winning several counties and even won Wisconsin's 5th congressional district. Edwards reached 40% in 5 counties, and Kerry did win a majority of the counties in the state. One of Kerry's keys to victory was winning the heavily populated and the county with the highest turnout, Milwaukee County, with 40% of the vote.

Following a poor third place finish, Dean, who just a few months ago was seen as the frontrunner for the Democratic nomination, suspended his campaign.

== See also ==
- 2004 Democratic Party presidential primaries
