= 2004 North Carolina Democratic presidential caucuses =

2004 North Carolina Democratic presidential primary
- April 17, 2004

107 Democratic National Convention delegates (90 pledged, 17 unpledged) The number of pledged delegates received is determined by the popular vote
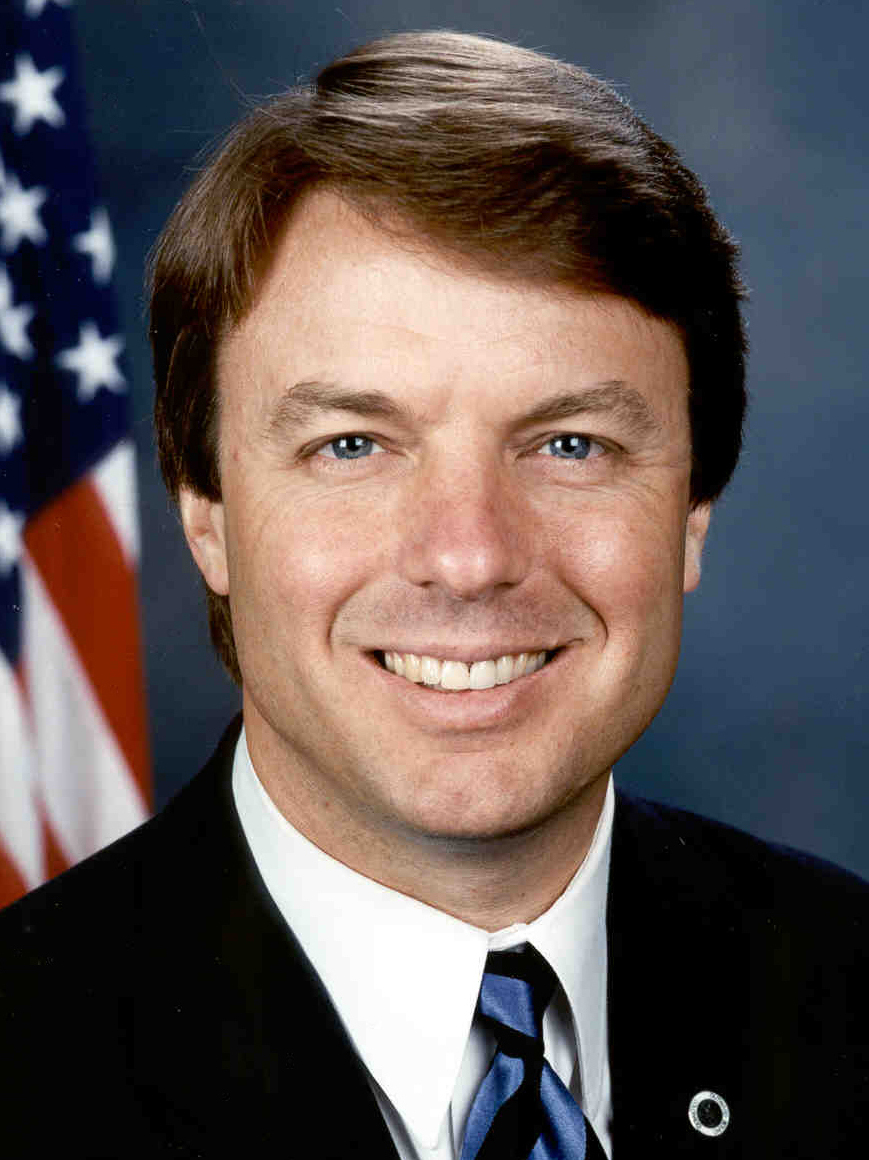

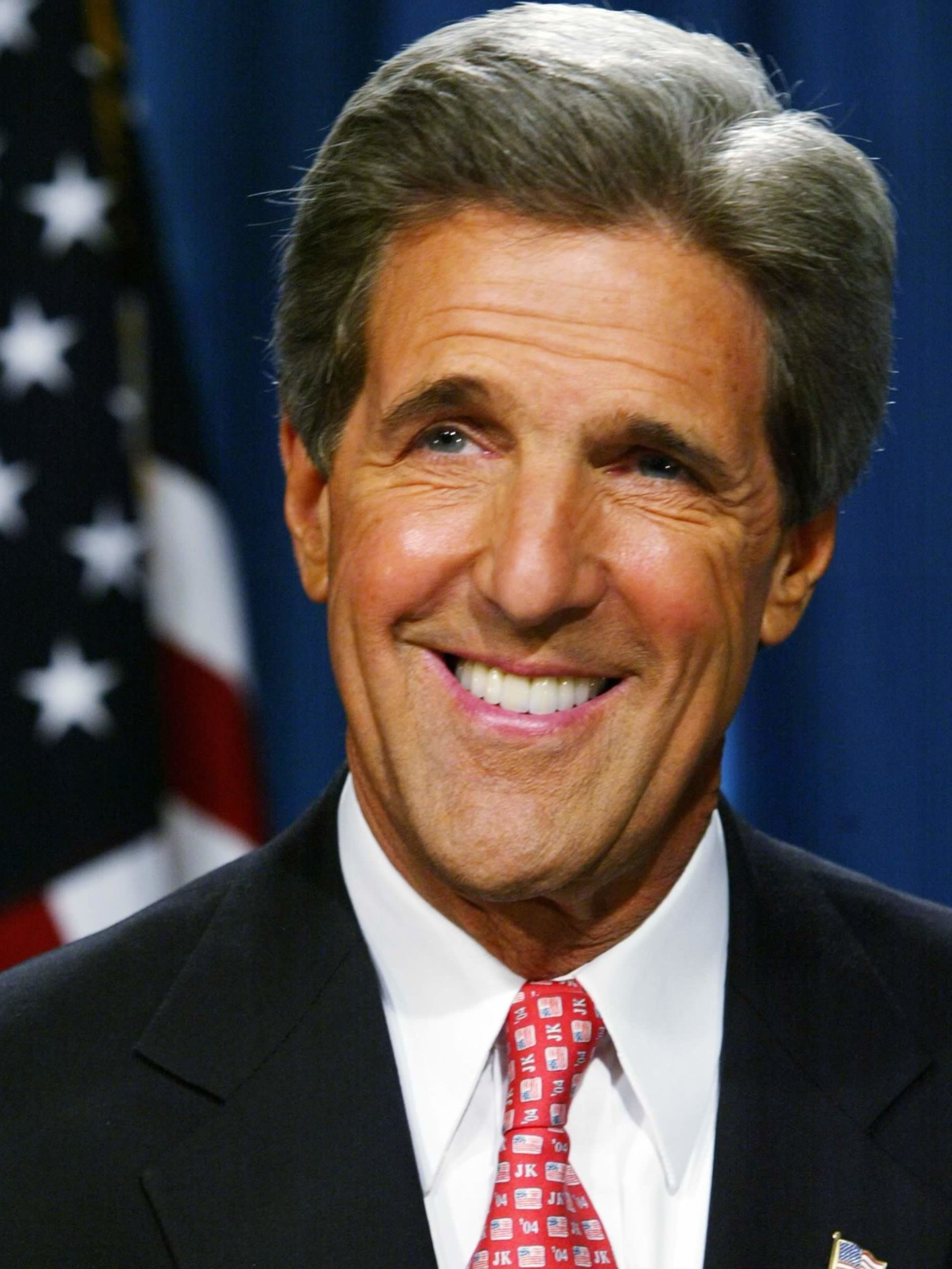

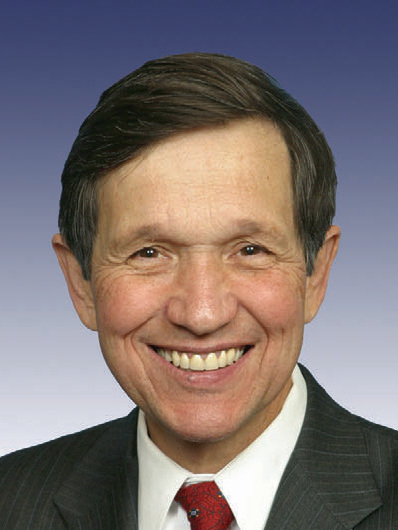

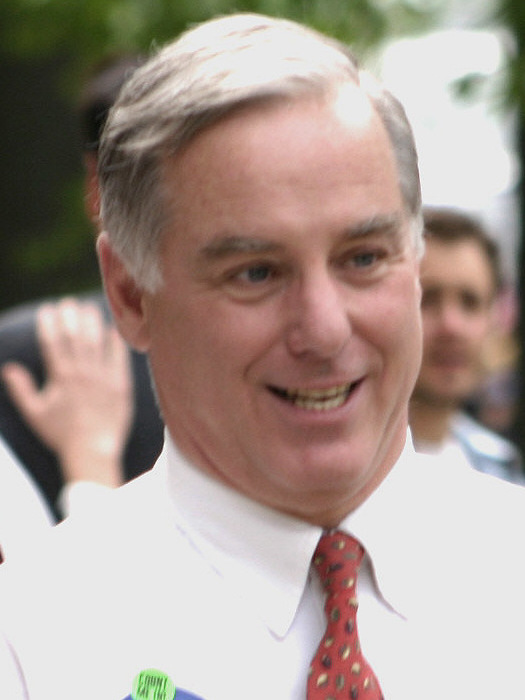
Candidate	John Edwards (withdrawn)	John Kerry
Home state	North Carolina	Massachusetts
Delegate count	57	29
Popular vote	9,093	4,844
Percentage	51.06%	27.20%
Candidate	Dennis Kucinich	Howard Dean (withdrawn)
Home state	Ohio	Vermont
Delegate count	4	0
Popular vote	2,175	1,009
Percentage	12.21%	5.67%
- North Carolina results by county Edwards: 20–30% 30–40% 40–50% 50–60% 60–70% 70–80% 80–90% Kerry: 40–50% 50–60% 60–70% 80–90% >90% Kucinich: 30–40% 40–50% 50–60% Sharpton: 60–70%

The 2004 North Carolina Democratic presidential caucuses were held on April 17 in the U.S. state of North Carolina as one of the Democratic Party's statewide nomination contests ahead of the 2004 presidential election.

== Results ==
2004 North Carolina Democratic presidential caucuses
Candidate	Votes	%	Delegates
John Edwards	9,093	51.06	57
John Kerry	4,844	27.20	29
Dennis Kucinich	2,175	12.21	4
Howard Dean (withdrawn)	1,009	5.67	0
Al Sharpton	582	3.27	0
Uncommitted	106	0.60	17
Total	17,809	100%	107

== See also ==
- 2004 North Carolina Republican presidential primary
- 2004 Democratic Party presidential primaries
- 2004 United States presidential election in North Carolina
