= 2004 Democratic Party presidential primaries =

Selection of the Democratic Party nominee

- January 14 to June 8, 2004

4,322 delegates to the Democratic National Convention; 2,162 (majority) needed to win
- Opinion polls
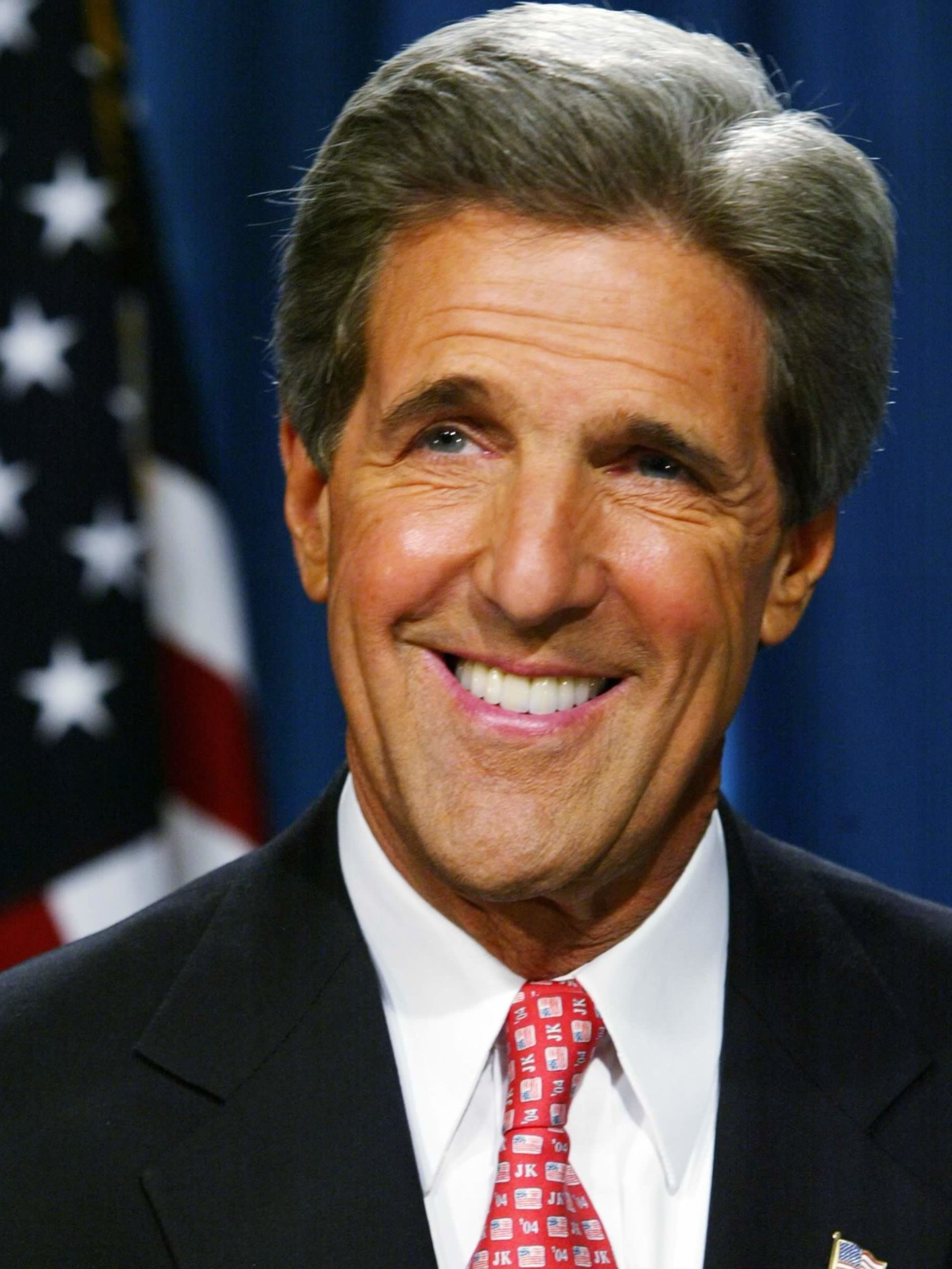

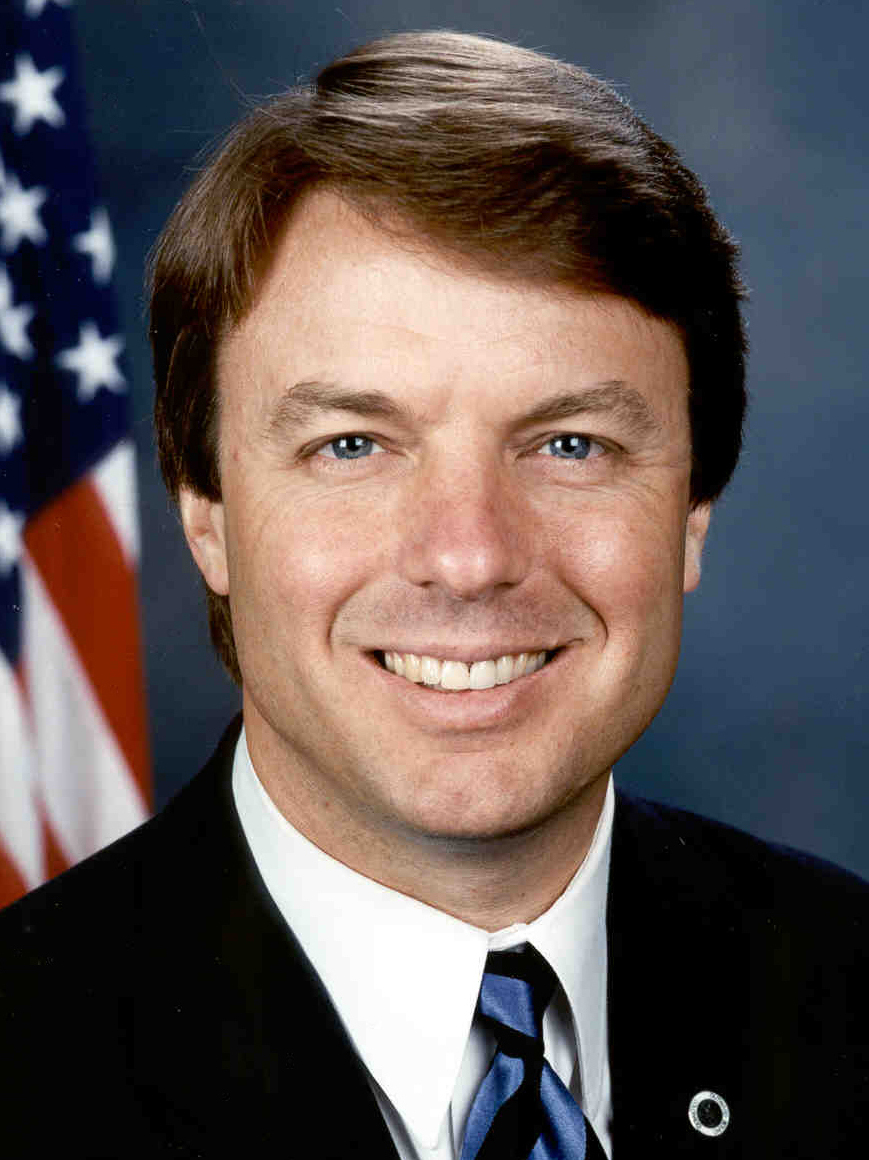

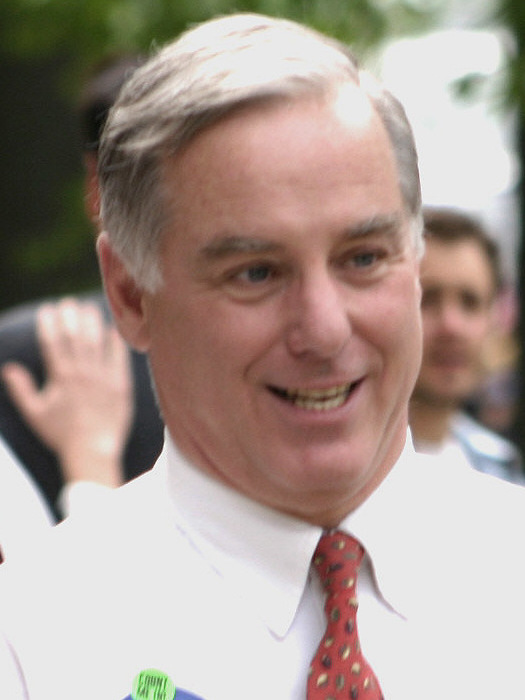

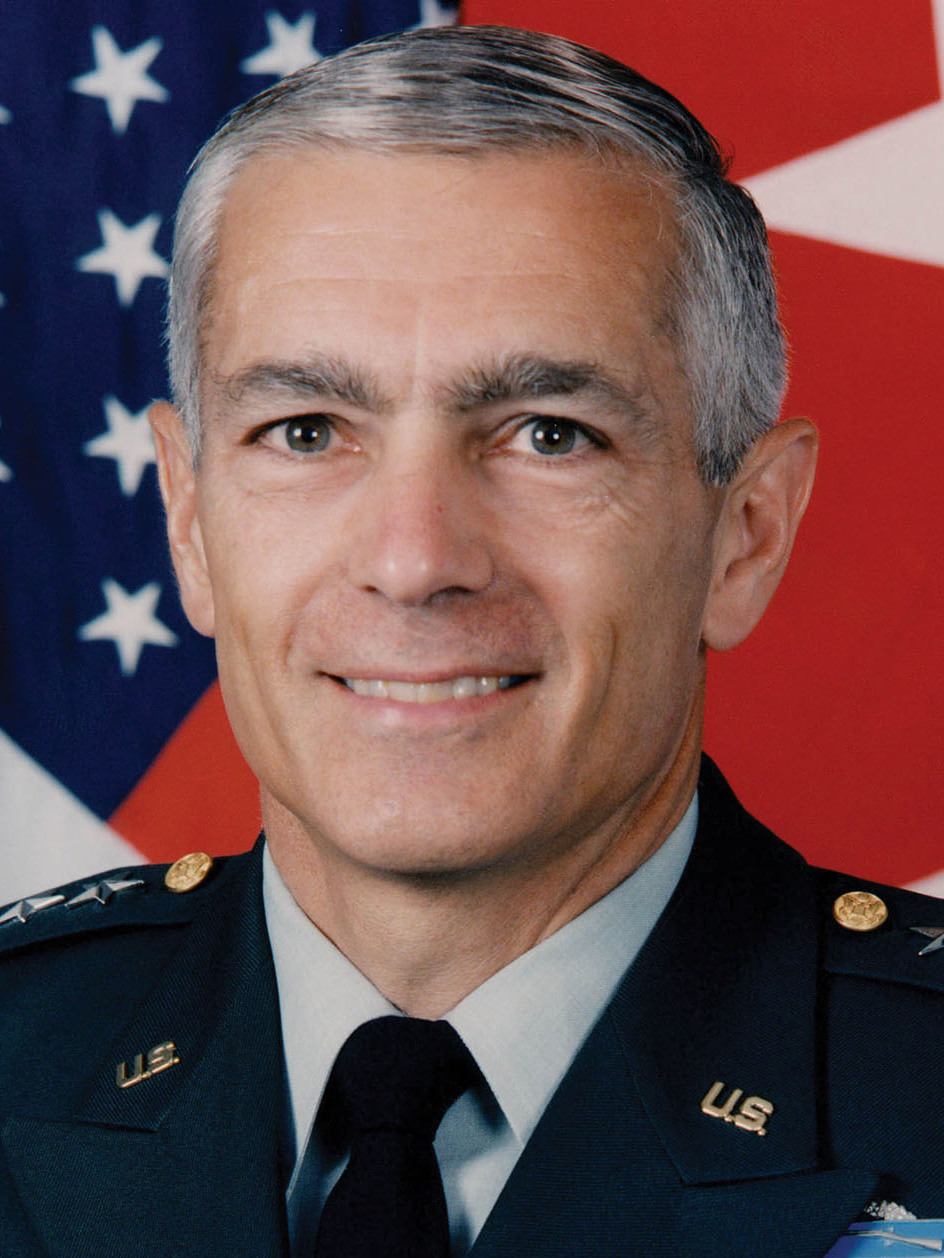
Candidate	John Kerry	John Edwards
Home state	Massachusetts	North Carolina
Delegate count	2,573.5	559
Contests won	52	2
Popular vote	9,930,497	3,162,337
Percentage	61.0%	19.4%
Candidate	Howard Dean	Wesley Clark
Home state	Vermont	Arkansas
Delegate count	167.5	60
Contests won	1	1
Popular vote	903,460	547,369
Percentage	5.55%	3.4%
John Kerry
John Edwards
Howard Dean
Wesley Clark
Previous Democratic nominee
Al Gore
Democratic nominee
John Kerry

Presidential primaries and caucuses were organized by the Democratic Party to select delegates to the 2004 Democratic National Convention to determine the party's nominee for president in the 2004 election.

Senator John Kerry of Massachusetts won the nomination by securing more than the required 2,162 delegates on March 11, 2004. He was formally nominated by the Democratic National Convention on July 29, 2004, in Boston. Kerry went on to lose the general election on November 2 to incumbent Republican President George W. Bush.

== Candidates ==
=== Nominee ===
Candidate	Most recent office	Home state	Campaign	Popular vote	Contests won	Running mate
John Kerry	U.S. Senator from Massachusetts (1985–2013)	Massachusetts	(Campaign); Secured nomination: March 2, 2004	9,930,497 (60.98%)	52	John Edwards

=== Withdrew during primaries ===
The following candidates received more than 1% of the national popular vote or were included in multiple major national polls:

Candidate	Most recent office	Home state	Campaign Withdrawal date	Popular vote	Contests won
Dennis Kucinich	U.S. Representative from Ohio's 10th (1997–2013)	Ohio	Withdrew: July 22 (Campaign)	620,242 (3.81%)	0
Al Sharpton	Activist and television host	New York	Withdrew: March 15 (Campaign)	380,865 (2.34%)	0
John Edwards	U.S. Senator from North Carolina (1999–2005)	North Carolina	Withdrew: March 2 (Campaign)	3,162,337 (19.42%)	2 NC,SC
Howard Dean	Governor of Vermont (1991–2003)	Vermont	Withdrew: February 18 (Campaign)	903,460 (5.55%)	1 VT
Wesley Clark	Supreme Allied; Commander Europe (1997–2000)	Arkansas	Withdrew: February 11 (Campaign)	547,369 (3.36%)	1 OK
Joe Lieberman	U.S. Senator from Connecticut (1989–2013)	Connecticut	Withdrew: February 3 (Campaign)	280,940 (1.73%)	0
Dick Gephardt	House Minority Leader (1995–2003)	Missouri	Withdrew: January 20 (Campaign)	63,902 (0.39%)	0
Carol Moseley; Braun	U.S. Senator from Illinois (1993–1999)	Illinois	Withdrew: January 15	98,469 (0.61%)	0

=== Withdrew before primaries ===
Candidate	Experience	Home state	Campaign Withdrawal date
Bob Graham	U.S. Senator from Florida (1987–2005)	Florida	Withdrew: October 6, 2003 (Campaign)

=== Declined to run ===
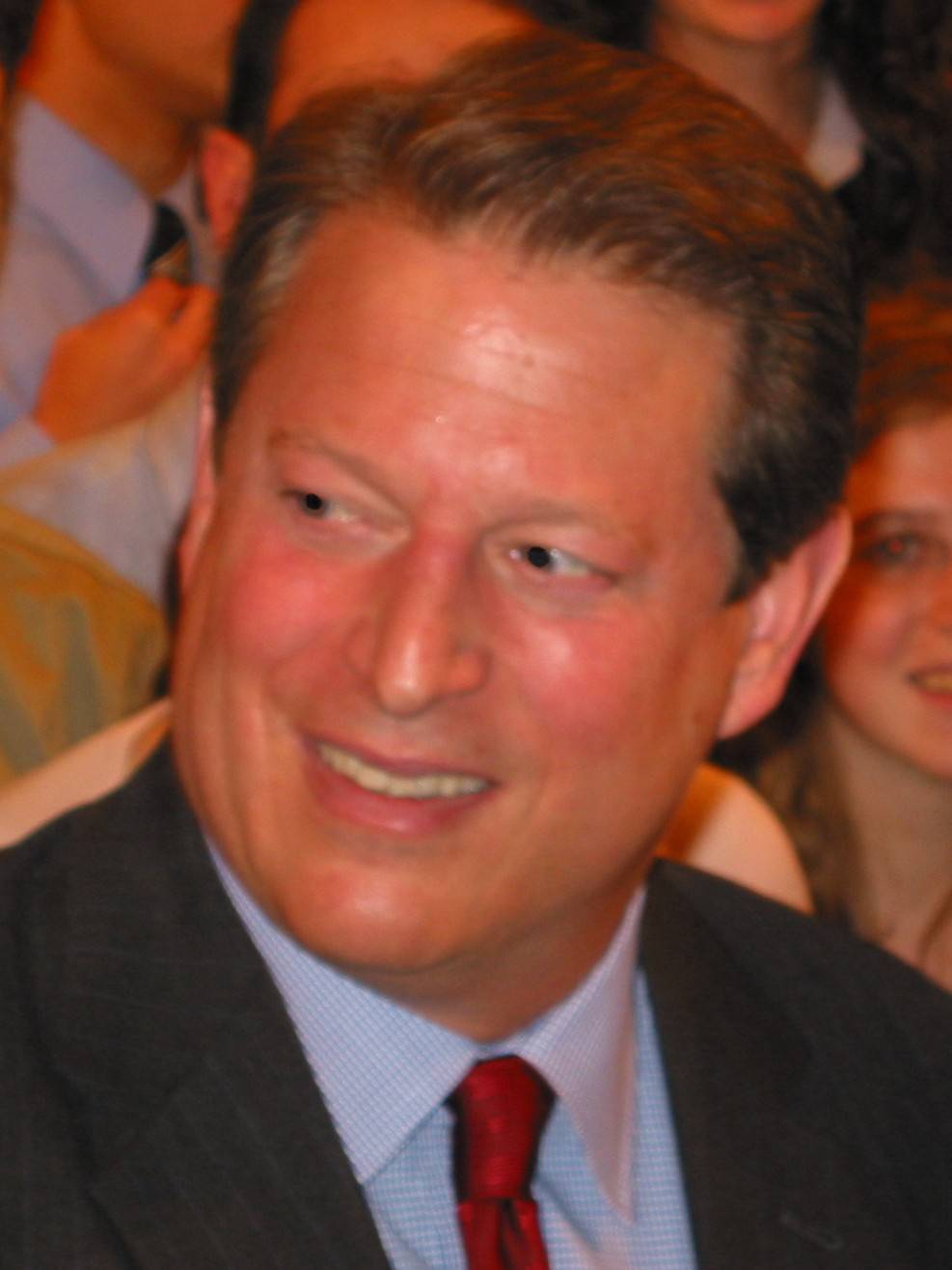
Al Gore, former Vice President and 2000 Democratic nominee, and candidate for president in 1988

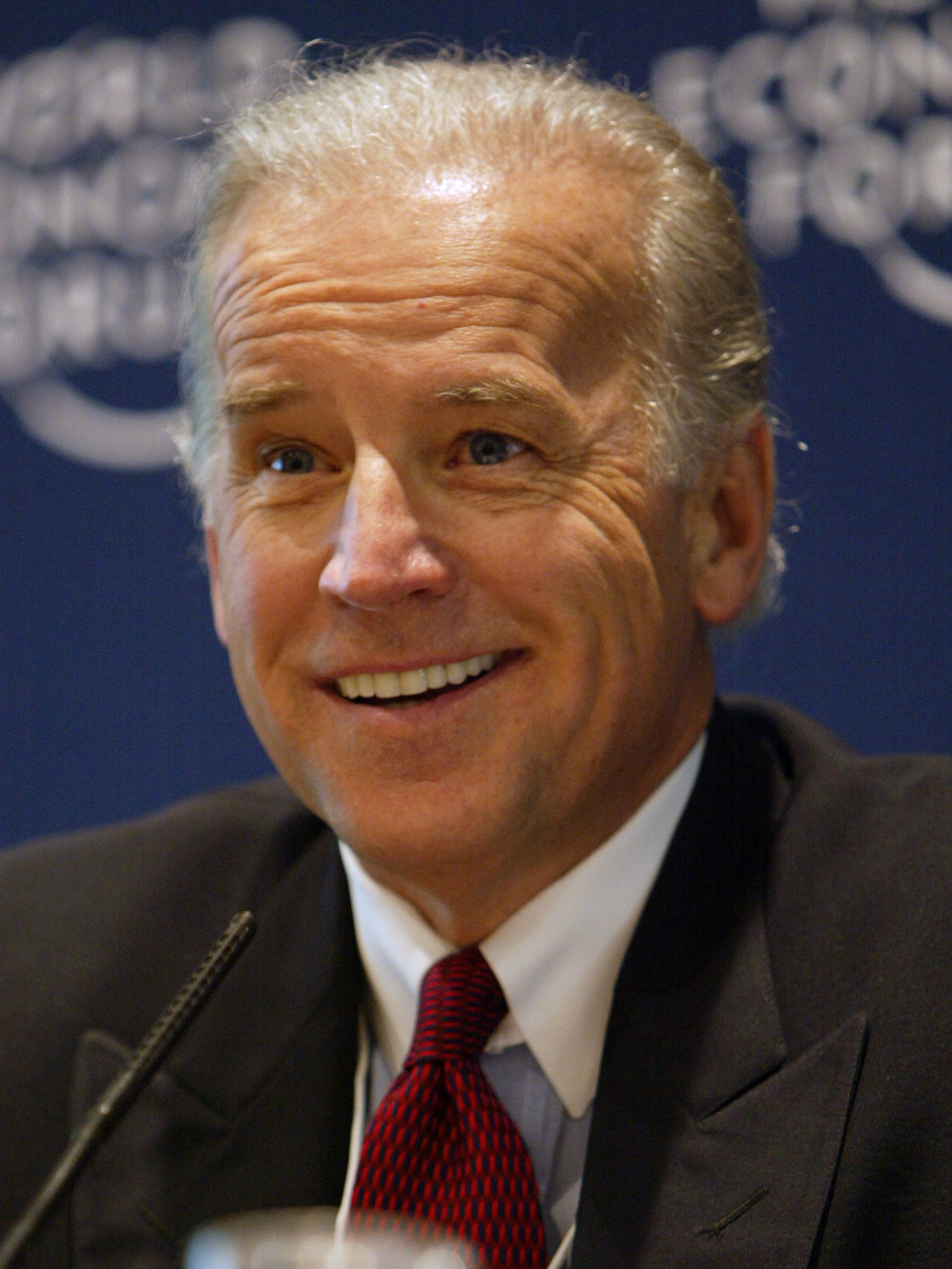
Joe Biden, U.S. Senator from Delaware, and candidate for president in 1988

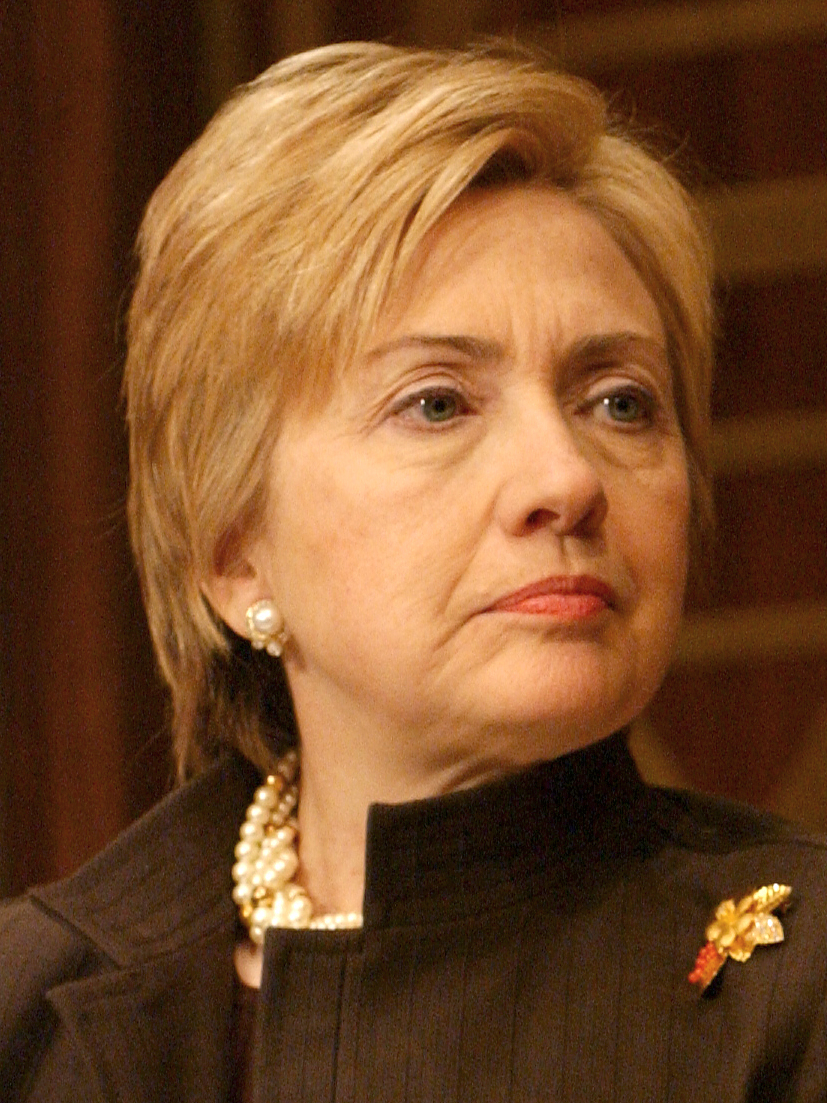
Hillary Clinton, U.S. Senator from New York

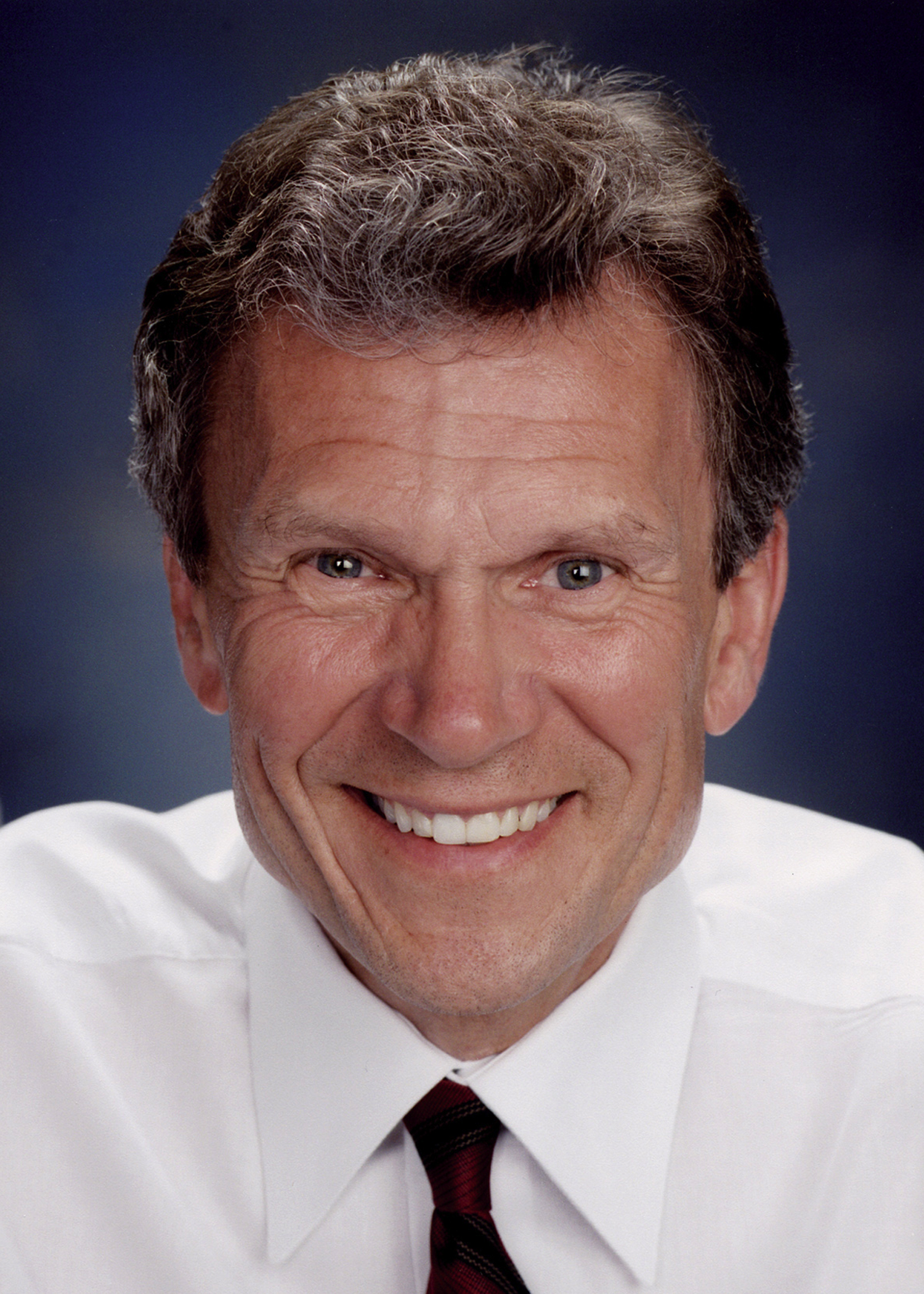
Tom Daschle, U.S. Senator from South Dakota (ran for re-election)

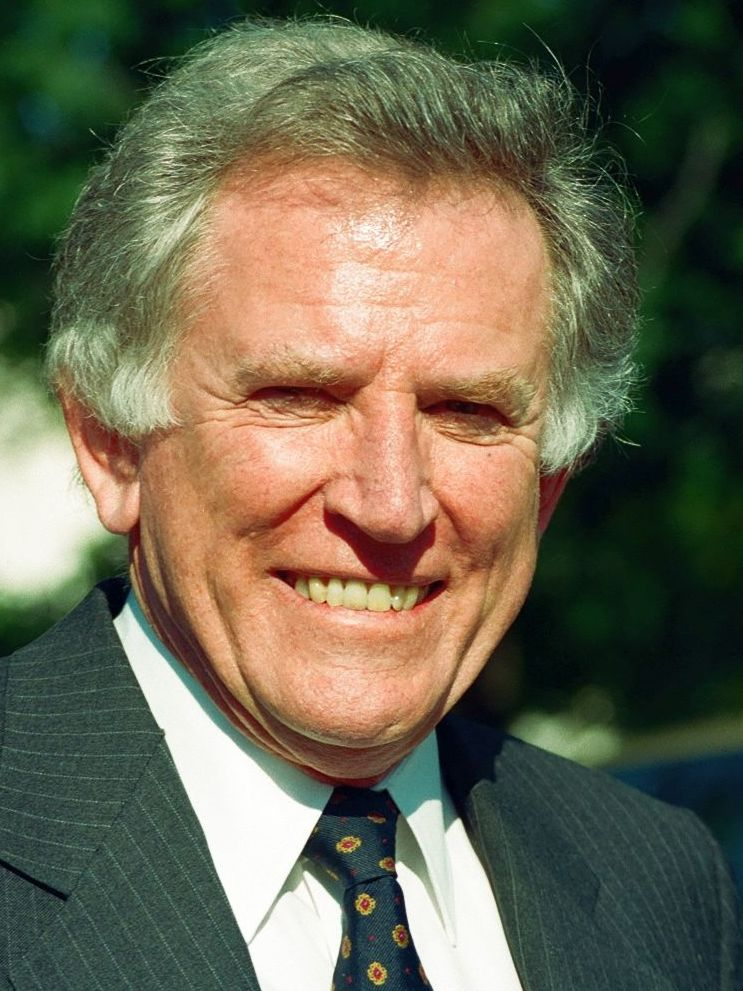
Gary Hart, former U.S. Senator from Colorado, and candidate for president in 1984, and 1988

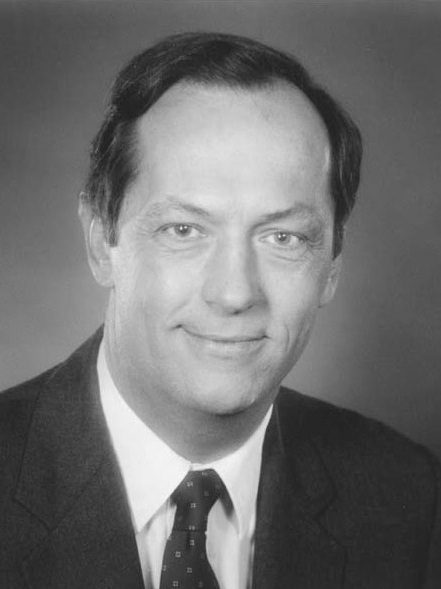
Bill Bradley, former U.S. Senator from New Jersey, and candidate for president in 2000

Jesse Jackson, civil rights activist and minister, candidate for president in 1984, and 1988

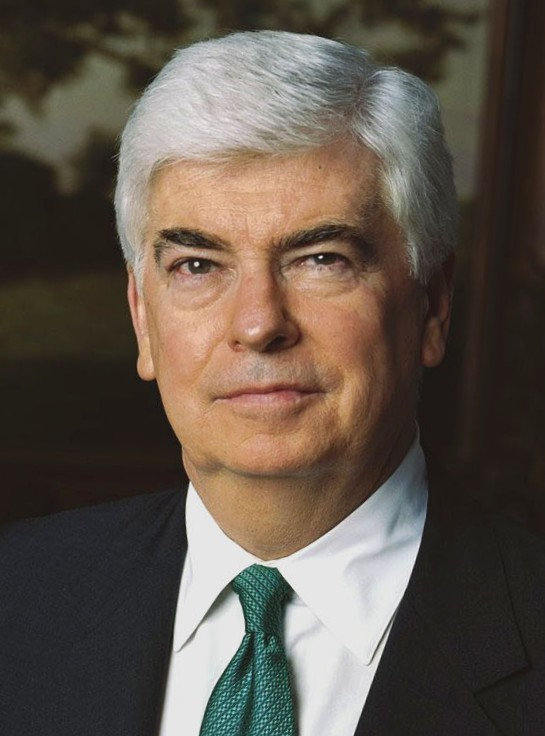
Chris Dodd, U.S. Senator from Connecticut (ran successfully for re-election)

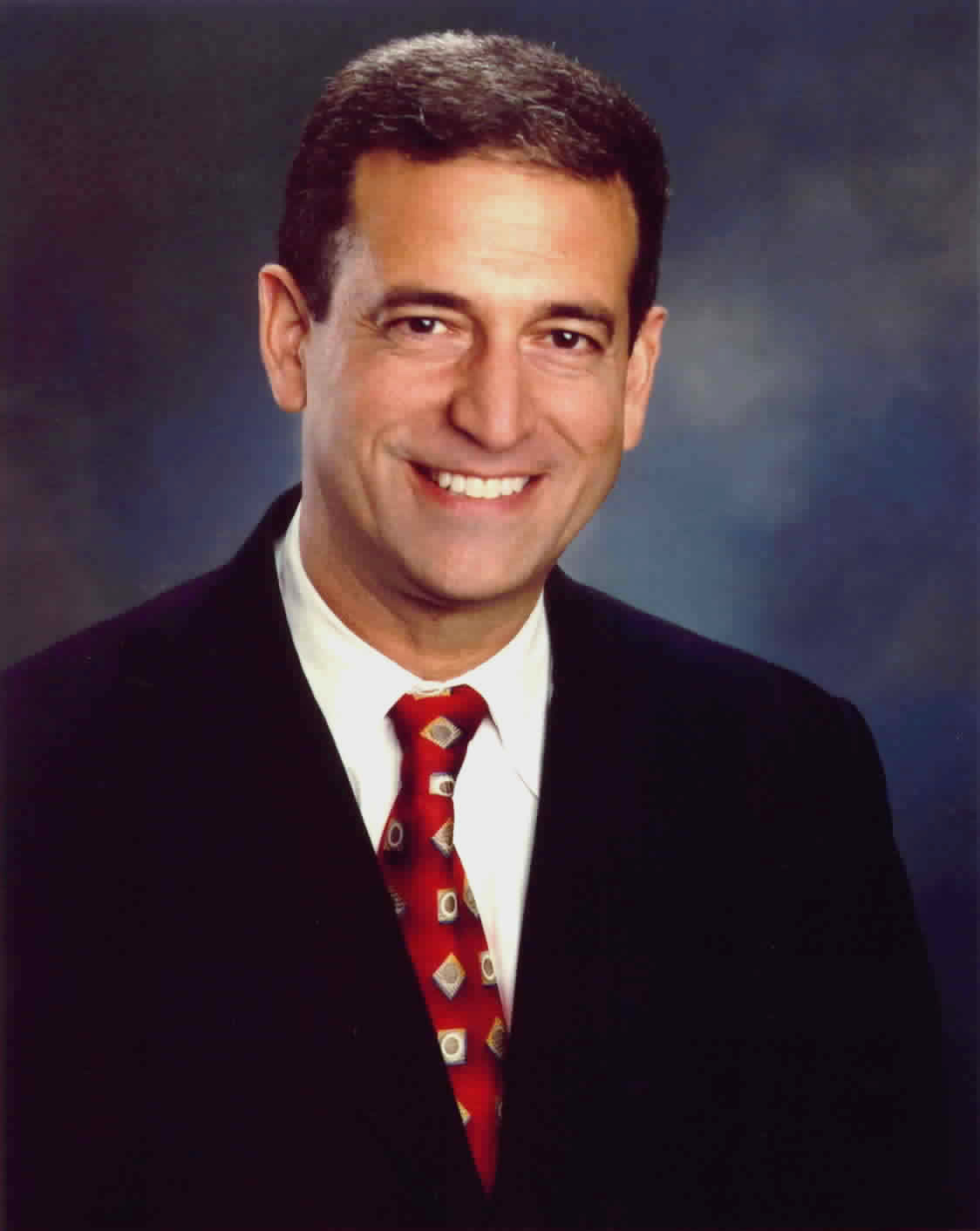
Russ Feingold, U.S. Senator from Wisconsin (ran successfully for re-election)

Marcy Kaptur, U.S. Representative from Ohio (ran successfully for re-election)

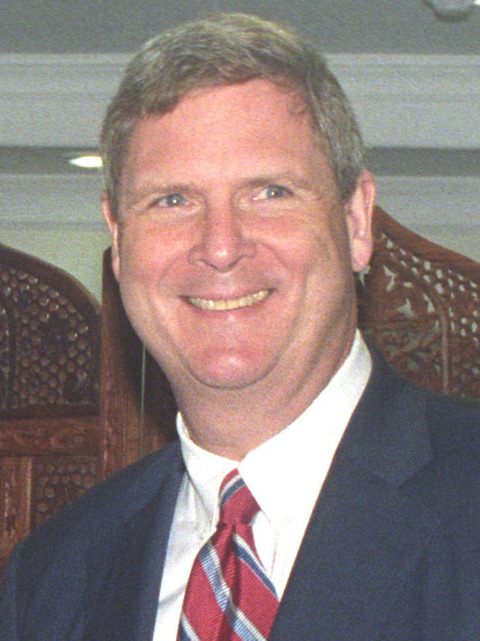
Tom Vilsack, Governor of Iowa

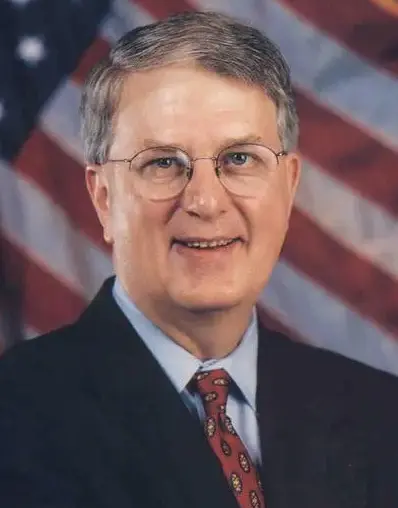
Roy Barnes, Governor of Georgia

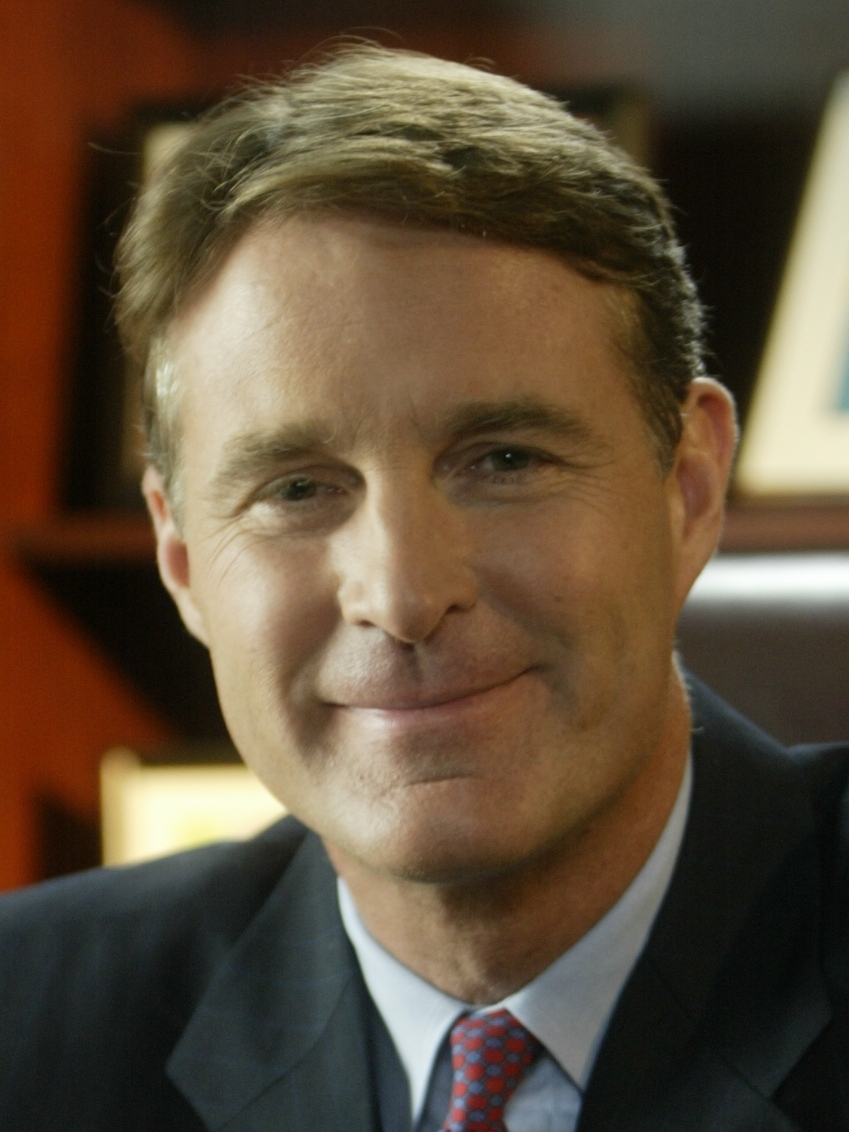
Evan Bayh, U.S. Senator from Indiana (ran successfully for re-election)

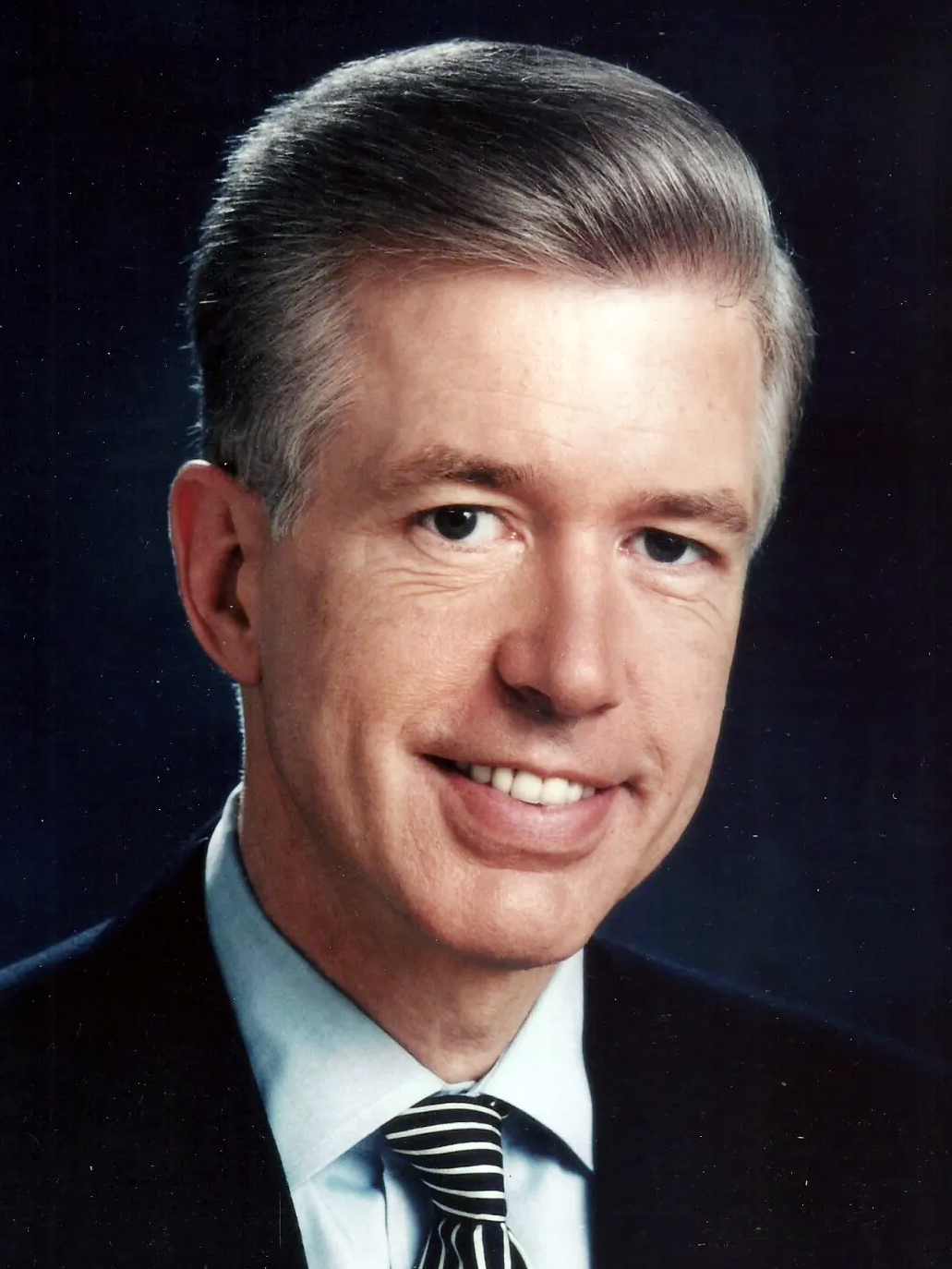
Gray Davis, former Governor of California

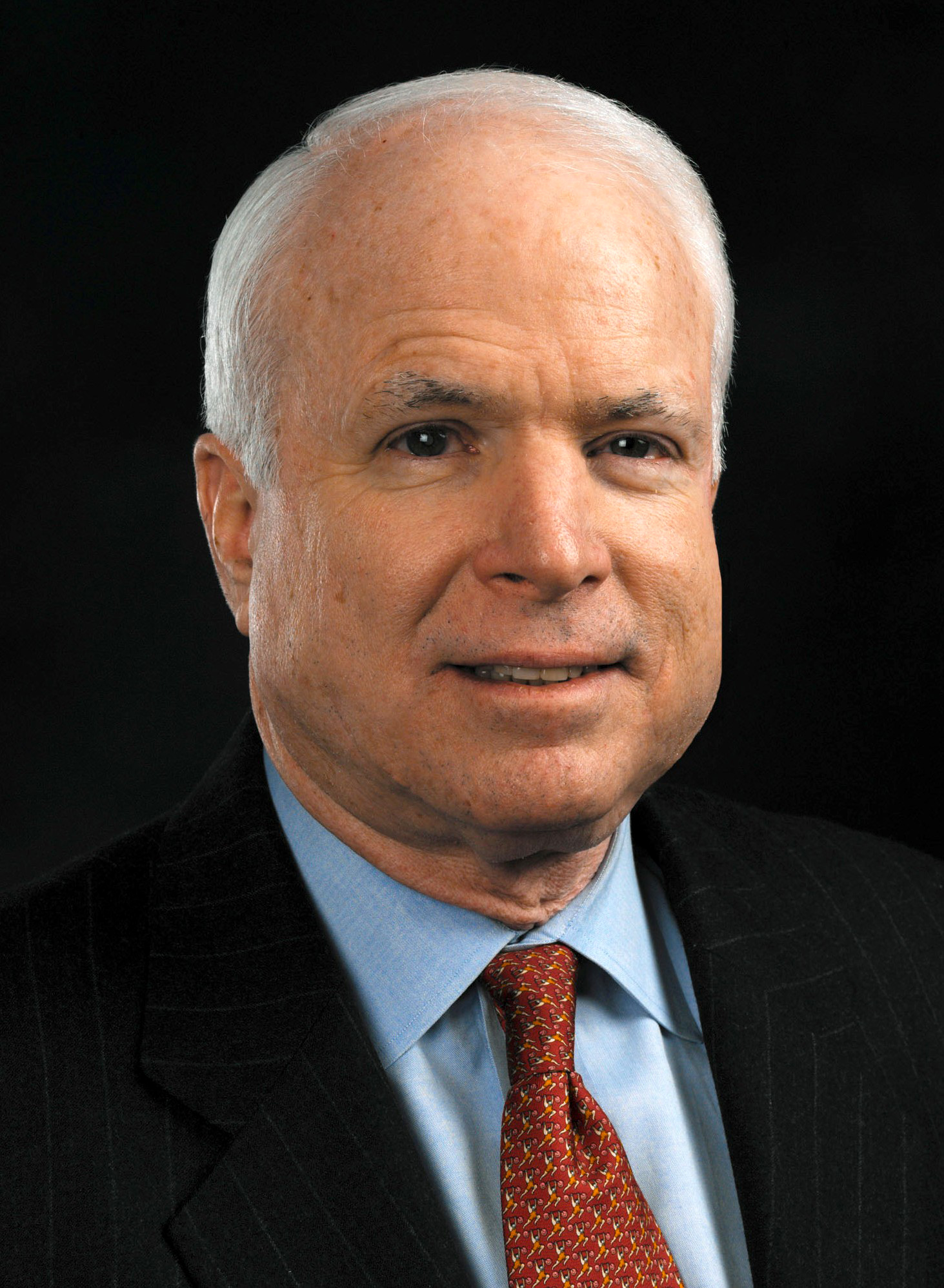
John McCain, Republican U.S. Senator from Arizona, and candidate for president in 2000, (ran successfully for re-election)

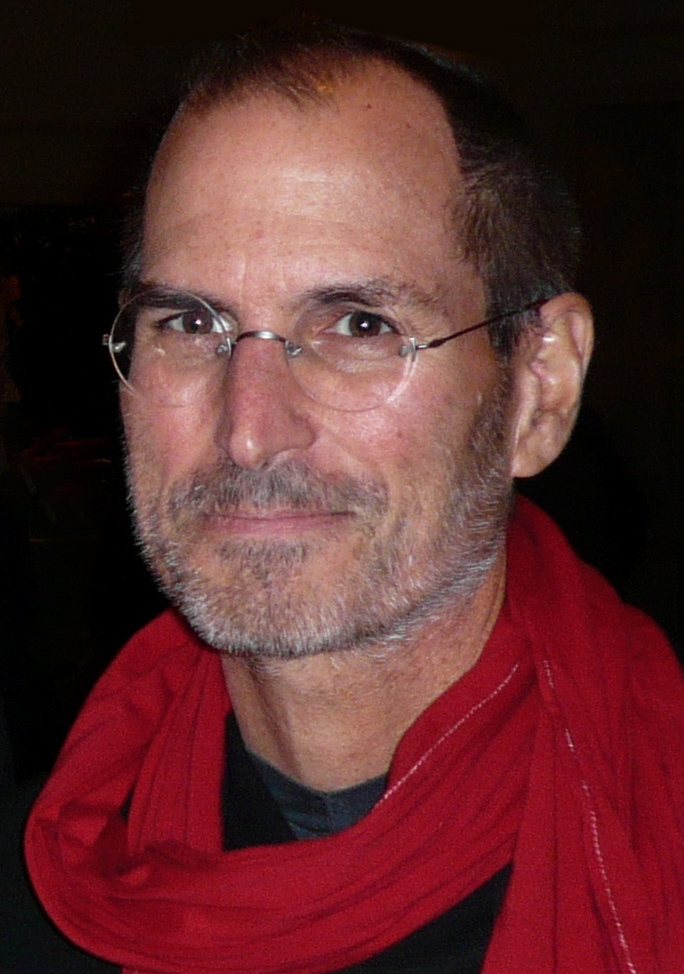
Steve Jobs, CEO of Apple Inc. from California

== Primary race overview ==
Ten candidates vied for the nomination, including Senators John Kerry and John Edwards, former Governor of Vermont Howard Dean, and retired four-star general Wesley Clark. For most of 2003, Dean had been the apparent front-runner for the nomination, performing strongly in most polls and leading the race in fund-raising. However, Kerry won the Iowa caucuses and New Hampshire primary, which gave him enough momentum to carry most of the remaining states.

=== Election issues ===
According to exit polls taking during the Iowa caucuses, the top four issues were ranked as follows:

1. Economy/Jobs (29% of respondents)
2. Health Care/Medicine (28% of respondents)
3. The war in Iraq (14% of respondents)
4. Education (14% of respondents)

==== Economy ====
Despite being characterized by many as an election on the Iraq War, the economy and jobs were repeatedly cited as voters' top or one of top three concerns during the course of the primary season. In Iowa, of those who cited the economy as their most important issue, 34% supported Kerry, while 33% supported Edwards, with Dean trailing at 16% and Gephardt at 12%.

Eventual nominee John Kerry, much like other Democrats, adopted policy stances of tax cuts for the middle class, increased spending for Social Security, and assisting small businesses. On the aspect of job creation, Kerry strongly supported the creation and safety of infrastructure-related jobs, like those in the railroad industry. During the course of the primary Kerry continued to advocate positions such as fiscal responsibility and end state fiscal crises by giving states increased fiscal aid.

Runner-up John Edwards ran a position of support for the middle class as well as budget caps and enforcement. Strongly opposing Social Security privatization, and interested in middle class tax cuts, Edwards's main economic theme was support for the middle class, touting his own struggles as the son of a poor mill worker in South Carolina. Another major component of Edwards's message was to be able to reinstate fiscal responsibility.

Howard Dean, despite taking many of the same positions of his rivals including Edwards and Kerry, had a starkly different approach on the issue of Social Security and tax cuts. On taxes, Dean favored repealing the Bush tax cuts not only for the wealthiest of Americans as Edwards and Kerry proposed, but for all, including middle and lower classes.

==== Iraq War ====
After the September 11 attacks, the Bush administration argued that the need to remove Saddam Hussein from power in Iraq had now become urgent. Over the course of several months, Bush presented several premises for war, but the turning point was the allegation that Saddam's regime had tried to acquire nuclear material and had not properly accounted for biological and chemical material it was known to have possessed, potential weapons of mass destruction (WMD) in violation of U.N. sanctions. This situation escalated to the point that the United States assembled a group of about forty nations, including the United Kingdom, Spain, Italy, and Poland, which Bush called the "coalition of the willing", to invade Iraq without UN authorization.

The coalition invaded Iraq on March 20, 2003. Most contenders for the nomination were supportive of the effort. Only Dean and Kucinich firmly questioned the aims and tactics of the administration, setting themselves apart in the eyes of war protesters. Kerry, who had voted in favor of coalition invasion, said Bush had “failed miserably” in building that coalition and that "We need a regime change not just in Iraq. We need a regime change here in the United States." Republicans criticized Kerry for speaking out against a wartime president.

The invasion was swift, with the collapse of the Iraq government and the military of Iraq in about three weeks. The oil infrastructure of Iraq was rapidly secured with limited damage in that time. On May 1, George W. Bush landed on the aircraft carrier USS Abraham Lincoln, where he gave a speech announcing the end of major combat in the Iraq war. Clearly visible in the background was a banner stating "Mission Accomplished". Bush's landing was criticized by opponents as being overly theatrical and expensive. The banner, made by White House personnel (according to a CNN story:) and placed there by the U.S. Navy, was criticized as premature. Nonetheless, Bush's approval rating in the month of May rode at 66%, according to a CNN-USA Today-Gallup poll.

On May 3, 2003, Democrats met at the University of South Carolina in the first formal debate between the nine challengers for the nomination. The candidates disagreed on the Iraq War, health insurance and President Bush's tax cuts, but were united in their criticism of Bush's handling of the economy.

=== Dean emerges as front-runner ===
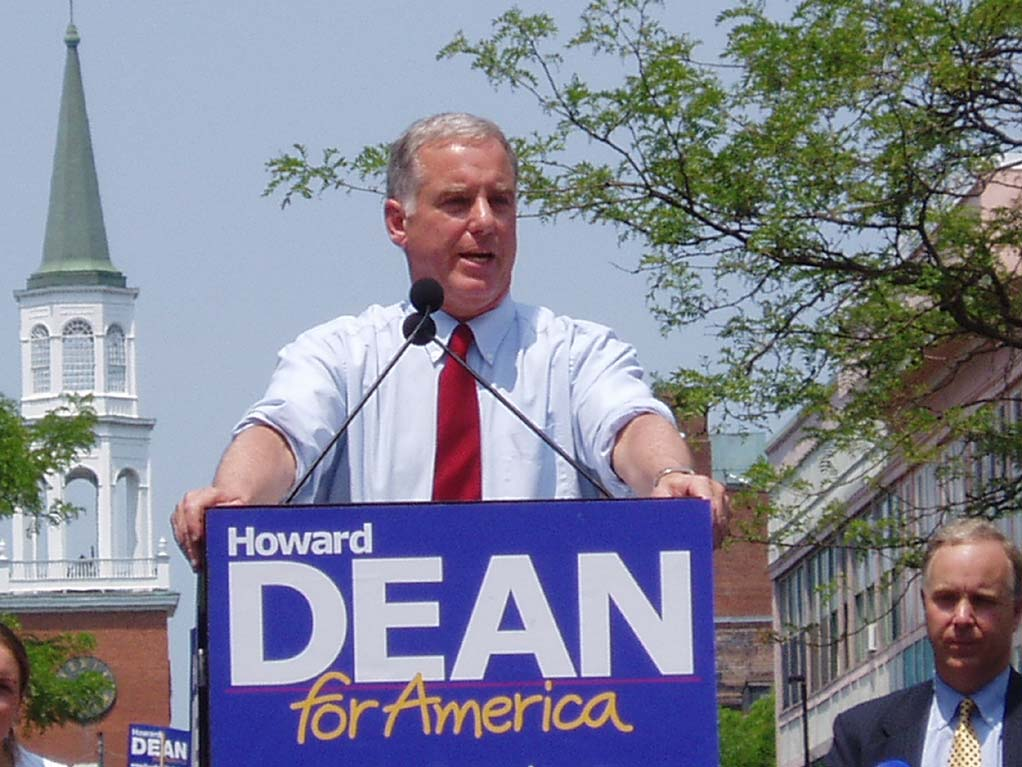
Howard Dean declared his candidacy on June 23, 2003, winning the MoveOn "primary" days later. His campaign would go on to lead most polls and raise the most money in the latter part of 2003.

On May 31, 2002, Howard Dean formed a presidential exploratory committee. Though this was almost two years before the Iowa caucus, Dean hoped the early start would give him some much needed name recognition. As the governor of a small state, Dean was not well known outside of New England.

In December of that year, John Kerry announced on NBC's Meet the Press his plans to form an exploratory committee for a possible 2004 presidential run (a formality usually indicating an official run), anticipating a formal announcement "down the road some months". Kerry's experience as a decorated Vietnam veteran generated some excitement among Democrats tired of being on the defensive about their candidates' suitability in the role of "commander in chief".

Two weeks later, former vice president and 2000 Democratic presidential nominee Al Gore announced on the CBS program 60 Minutes that he would not seek election to the presidency in 2004. Gore had recently wrapped up a nationwide book tour and had been widely expected to run.

Other potential candidates were likely waiting to see what Gore's plans were, and thus the floodgates opened in January 2003. Senator Joe Lieberman, Gore's 2000 vice presidential running mate, had previously promised not to run should Gore seek their party's nomination and was willing to be Gore's running mate again. Freed from that obligation, Lieberman announced his intention to run. Additionally, many other candidates announced their intention to form committees: Senator John Edwards of North Carolina, Representative Dick Gephardt of Missouri, and Reverend Al Sharpton of New York. In February, more candidates announced their intention to run: former Senator from Illinois Carol Moseley Braun, Representative from Ohio Dennis Kucinich, and Senator Bob Graham of Florida.

There were other potential candidates for whom some speculation was buzzing about a potential run. These candidates felt it necessary to officially state that they would not seek the party nomination. These included Senate Minority Leader Tom Daschle, Senator Christopher Dodd of Connecticut, and former U.S. Senator Gary Hart from Colorado.

In April, Democratic fund-raising totals for the first quarter of 2003 were reported. Edwards raised $7.4 million, Kerry raised $7.0 million, Gephardt raised $3.5 million, Lieberman raised $3.0 million, Dean raised $2.6 million, Graham raised $1.1 million, and Kucinich and Moseley Braun raised less than $1 million each.

In June 2003, Dean aired the first television advertising of the 2004 campaign, spending more than $300,000. During that time, he formally announced his run for president, filing to form a presidential election campaign with the Federal Election Commission (FEC). Later that month, liberal advocacy website MoveOn held the first ever online Democratic "primary", which lasted just over 48 hours. It was an unofficial and nonbinding affair, but with important symbolic and financial value. Of 317,647 votes, Dean received 44%, Kucinich 24%, and Kerry 16%. Had any candidate received 50% of the vote, they would have received MoveOn's endorsement and financial support. Instead, MoveOn supported all the candidates.

In July, the Democratic fund-raising numbers for the second quarter of 2003 were reported and announced. Dean surprised many by raising $7.5 million, while Kerry raised $6 million and Edwards and Lieberman raised roughly $5 million each. Dean's strength as a fund-raiser was attributed mainly to his innovative embrace of the Internet for campaigning. The majority of his donations came from individual Dean supporters, who came to be known as Deanites, or, more commonly, Deaniacs. His campaign's innovative use of the Internet helped to build a strongly supportive grassroots constituency, much of which remained intensely loyal to him long after the end of his candidacy.

By the autumn of 2003, Dean had become the apparent front-runner for the Democratic nomination, performing strongly in most polls. Generally regarded as a pragmatic centrist during his time as governor, Dean emerged during his presidential campaign as something of a populist, denouncing the policies of the Bush administration (especially the 2003 invasion of Iraq) as well as fellow Democrats, who, in his view, failed to strongly oppose them.

During his presidential campaign, critics on the right labeled Dean's political views as those of an extreme liberal; however, in liberal Vermont, Dean, long known as a staunch advocate of fiscal restraint, was regarded as a moderate. Many critics on the left, who supported fellow Dennis Kucinich or independent Ralph Nader, charged that, at heart, Dean was a "Rockefeller Republican"—socially liberal, while fiscally conservative.

=== Wesley Clark enters ===
Over the summer of 2003, several organized groups began a nationwide campaign to "draft" retired four-star general Wesley Clark for the Democratic Party's nomination for the 2004 presidential election. On August 13, CNN] showed a commercial by one of these groups and interviewed Clark. He disavowed any connection with the "Draft Clark" groups, but said he had been considering his position and that within a few weeks he would likely make public his decision on whether to run. He also fueled speculation with a television interview in which he first declared himself a Democrat.

On September 17, 2003, in Little Rock, Arkansas, Clark announced his intention to run for the Democratic Party nomination, becoming the tenth and last Democrat to do so (coming many months after the others): "My name is Wes Clark. I am from Little Rock, Arkansas, and I am here to announce that I intend to seek the presidency of the United States of America." He said, "We're going to run a campaign that will move this country forward, not back."

His campaign focused on themes of leadership and patriotism; early campaign ads relied heavily on biography. His late start left him with relatively few detailed policy proposals. This weakness was apparent in his first few debates, although he soon presented a range of position papers, including a major tax-relief plan. Nevertheless, many Democrats flocked to his campaign. They were drawn by his military background, and saw such foreign policy credentials as a valuable asset in challenging George W. Bush after the September 11 attacks. Advisors and supporters portrayed him as more electable than Howard Dean, who was still the front-runner for the party's nomination. Despite the burst of enthusiasm for Clark in late 2003, Dean maintained a strong lead in the polls for the latter half of the year. Clark's only victory was in the Oklahoma primary on February 3.

Criticism of Clark began almost the moment he entered the race. Originally heralded as an antiwar general, he stumbled in the first few days of his candidacy. He was perceived as changing his answer on how he would have voted on the Iraq war resolution. His supporters argued that his perceived indecision was due to lack of experience with the media and their insistence on short "sound bite" answers.

=== Iowa and New Hampshire ===
Throughout the early campaigning season, the Iowa caucuses appeared to be a two-way contest between Dean and Gephardt. Dean, the national front runner, had been able to pour money into Iowa and New Hampshire. In total, Dean spent nearly $40 million in the two states. Gephardt, coming from neighboring Missouri, won the state's caucus in 1988 when he first ran for the party nomination.

However, days before the Iowa caucuses were held, negative campaigning by Dean and Gephardt took a late toll on the two campaigns in Iowa as well as nationally. This, along with the resurgence of John Kerry and the emergence of John Edwards as major contenders in Iowa, put the Gephardt and Dean campaigns on edge.

A poll released by The Des Moines Register days before the caucus was held showed that Dean and Gephardt had lost all of their lead in Iowa. In the poll, Kerry led with 26% of those surveyed, Edwards came in second with 23%, Dean came in third with 20%, and Gephardt came in fourth with 18%.

On caucus night, as results were being tallied, it became evident that Kerry and Edwards were in a battle for first and Dean and Gephardt were in a battle for third.

Iowa results by county: Kerry: 30–40%; 40–50%; 50–60%; Edwards: 20–30%; 30–40%; 40–50%; 50–60%; Dean: 30–40%; 40–50%; Tie

After all votes were tallied, John Kerry received 38% of the delegates, John Edwards received 32%, Howard Dean received 18%, and Richard Gephardt received 11%.

After his poor showing, Gephardt dropped out of the race. Kerry and Edwards claimed newfound momentum, while Dean attempted to downplay the results, which resulted into his infamous Dean scream.

In the New Hampshire primary, Kerry was able to defeat Howard Dean once again, beating him 38%-26%. The final debate before the primary was held at Saint Anselm College; Kerry's performance was superior to the others, helping him win the primary a few days later. Kerry carried nearly all constituencies during the primary according to exit polling data. Clark came in third with 12%, Edwards fourth with 12%, and Lieberman fifth with 9%.

After Kerry's wins, he received attention for using the phrase "Bring it on!" during his speeches before and after the contests in response to potential attacks on his candidacy.

=== Mini Tuesday, Super Tuesday and later primaries ===
Super Tuesday 2004

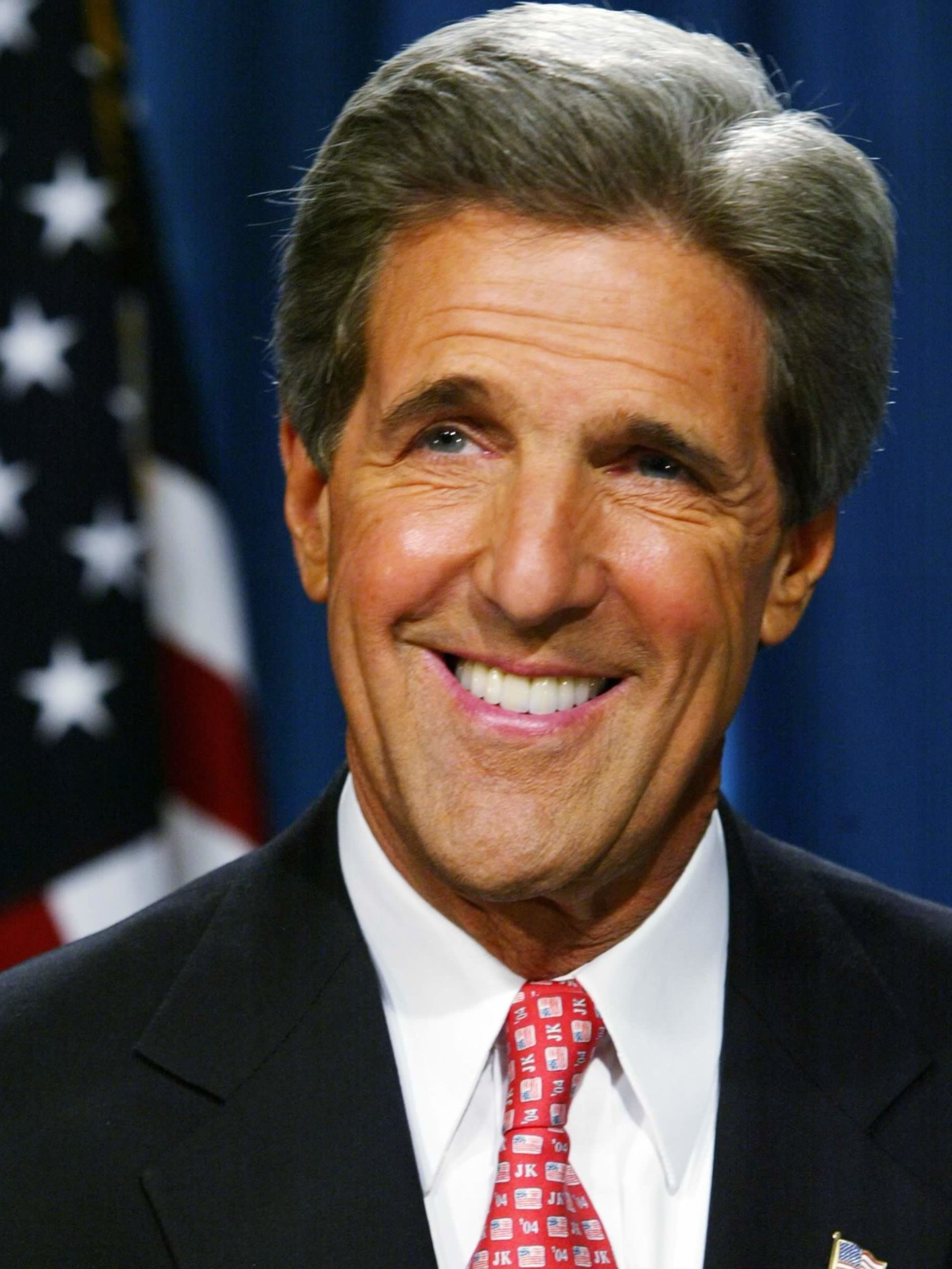
Massachusetts Senator John Kerry

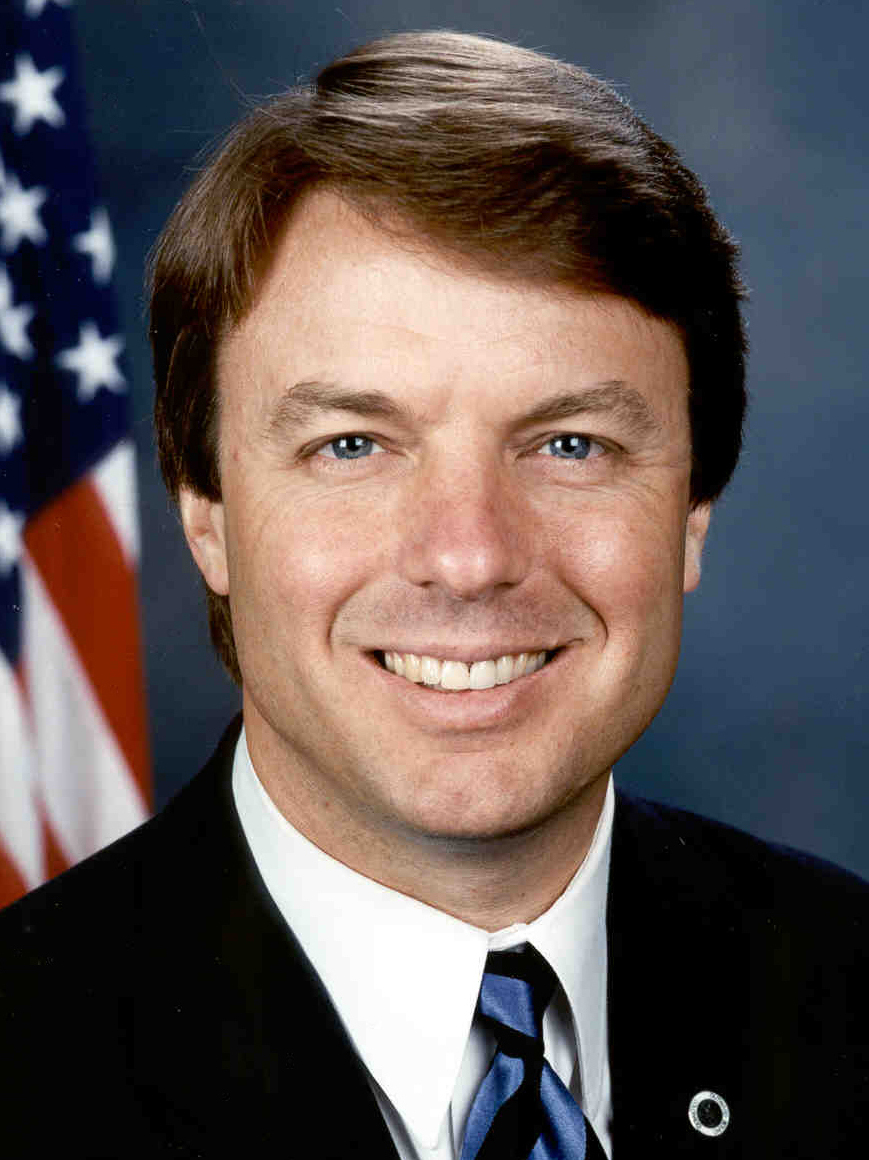
North Carolina Senator John Edwards

Super Tuesday, 2004 held key Democratic contests including New York, Ohio, California and Georgia

Nominating contests: 10

- Won by Kerry: 9
- Won by Edwards: 0

Pledged delegates at stake: 1,164

- Delegates won by Kerry: 844
- Delegates won by Edwards: 207
- Delegates won by others: 13

Key results

- New York
  - Kerry: 61%
  - Edwards: 20%
- Ohio
  - Kerry: 52%
  - Edwards: 34%
- California
  - Kerry: 64%
  - Edwards: 20%
- Georgia
  - Kerry: 47%
  - Edwards: 41%

Edwards's late stage momentum, as well as his departure from the negative campaigning which characterized other leading candidates, carried him into a surprising second-place finish in Iowa with the support of 32% of caucus delegates, behind only John Kerry's 38% and ahead of former front-runner Howard Dean at 18%. He finished with 12% in the New Hampshire primary one week later, essentially tied for third-place position with retired general Wesley Clark. The following week, dubbed Mini Tuesday, Edwards won in South Carolina and nearly beat Clark in Oklahoma. However, Kerry won five primaries in various regions of the country to reinforce his status as frontrunner.

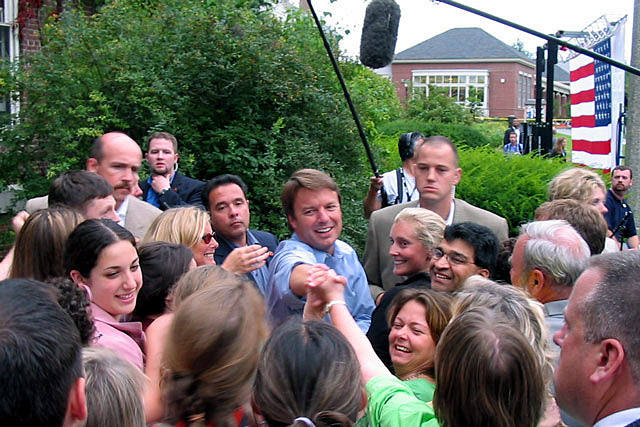
Edwards on the campaign trail in 2004.

After Dean's withdrawal from the contest, Edwards became the only major challenger to Kerry for the nomination. However, Kerry continued to dominate, taking in wins in Michigan, Washington, Maine, Tennessee, Washington, D.C., Nevada, Wisconsin, Utah, Hawaii and Idaho. Remarking on an unexpectedly strong finish in Wisconsin on February 17, Edwards humorously cautioned Kerry: "Objects in your mirror may be closer than they appear." At this point, only Kerry, Edwards, Sharpton and Kucinich remained in the running. Dean, while not officially running, did not release his delegates, and still put in a strong showing considering that he was no longer mounting an official campaign.

Edwards maintained a positive campaign and largely avoided attacking Kerry until a February 29, 2004, debate in New York City, where he attempted to put Kerry on the defensive by characterizing the front-runner as a "Washington insider" and by mocking Kerry's plan to form a committee to examine trade agreements.

On Super Tuesday on March 2, Kerry won decisive victories in the California, Connecticut, Georgia, Maryland, Massachusetts, New York, Ohio and Rhode Island primaries and the Minnesota caucuses. Dean, despite having withdrawn from the race two weeks earlier, won his home state of Vermont. Edwards finished only slightly behind Kerry in Georgia but, failing to win a single state, chose to withdraw, making Kerry the presumptive nominee. President Bush called Kerry to congratulate him that evening.

On March 11, after meetings with Democratic superdelegates in Washington, D.C., and former primary election opponents, Kerry accumulated the 2,162 delegates required to clinch the nomination. The DNC's website acknowledged him as the party's nominee at that time, four and a half months prior to the Convention.

=== Nomination ===
On July 6, John Kerry selected John Edwards as his running mate shortly before the 2004 Democratic National Convention in Boston, Massachusetts, held later that month. Senators Kerry and Edwards were formally nominated by the Democratic Party at the convention. The Kerry/Edwards ticket was on the ballot in all 50 states, plus the District of Columbia. In New York, the ticket was also on the ballot as candidates of the Working Families Party.

New Mexico Governor Bill Richardson served as chairman of the convention while former presidential advisor to Bill Clinton Lottie Shackelford served as vice chairman. Defining moments of the 2004 Democratic National Convention included the keynote speech of Barack Obama, then a candidate for the Senate from Illinois, Bill Clinton's opening night speech, and the confirmation of the nomination of Kerry as the candidate for president and of Edwards as the candidate for vice president. Kerry made his Vietnam War experience a prominent theme. In accepting the nomination, he began his speech with "I'm John Kerry and I'm reporting for duty."

Kerry and Edwards faced incumbents George W. Bush and Dick Cheney of the Republican Party in the general campaign. Following his official nomination at the convention, Kerry received only a small bounce in the polls and remained virtually tied with Bush. This was the first time in recent political history that a candidate failed to receive a substantial boost in post-convention poll numbers. Some political pundits attributed this small boost to the unusually small number of undecided voters compared with previous presidential elections.

Bush narrowly defeated Kerry in the general election. The election was fought primarily on the issue of the conduct of the war on terror. Bush defended the actions of his administration, while Kerry contended that the war had been fought incompetently, and that the Iraq War was a distraction from the war on terror, not a part of it.

== Overview ==
Nominee
Withdrawn campaigns
Exploratory committee
Midterm elections
Iowa caucuses
New Hampshire primary
Mini Tuesday
Super Tuesday
Final primaries
Democratic convention
General election

== Results ==
=== Statewide ===
2004 Democratic primaries and caucuses
		Delegates	Wesley Clark	Howard Dean	John Edwards	Dick Gephardt	John Kerry	Dennis Kucinich	Al Sharpton	Others
Total Delegates¹		4,322	60	167.5	559	--	2573.5	40	26	
Superdelegates¹		802	--	53	23	--	381	2	5	
January 14	District of Columbia² (non-binding primary)	0	--	17,736	--	--	--	3,435	14,248	
January 19	Iowa³ (caucus)	45	--	2,342 (5)	4,393 (10)	1,507	5,002 (30)	139	0	
January 27	New Hampshire (primary)	22	27,314^{4}	57,761 (9)	26,487	--	84,377^{4} (13)	1%	--	
February 3 (Mini Tuesday)	Arizona (primary)	55	27% (14)	14% (3)	7%	--	43% (38)	2%	--	
February 3 (Mini Tuesday)	Delaware (primary)	15	9%^{4}	10%	11%	1%^{4}	50% (14)	1%	6% (1)	
February 3 (Mini Tuesday)	Missouri (primary)	74	4%	9%	25% (26)	2%	51% (48)	1%	3%	
February 3 (Mini Tuesday)	New Mexico (caucus)	26	21% (8)	16% (4)	11%	1%^{4}	42% (14)	6%	--	
February 3 (Mini Tuesday)	North Dakota (caucus)	14	24% (5)	12%	10%	1%	51%^{4} (9)	3%	--	
February 3 (Mini Tuesday)	Oklahoma (primary)	40	30% (15)	4%	30% (13)	1%^{4}	27% (12)	1%	1%	
February 3 (Mini Tuesday)	South Carolina (primary)	45	7%	5%	45% (27)	--	30% (17)	--	10% (1)	
February 7	Michigan (caucus)	128	7%	17% (24)	13% (6)	1%^{4}	52% (91)	3%	7% (7)	
February 7	Washington (caucus)	76	3%	30% (29)	7%	--	48%^{4} (47)	8%	--	
February 8	Maine (caucus)	24	4%	27%^{4} (9)	8%	--	45% (15)	16%	--	
February 10	Tennessee (primary)	69	23% (18)	4%	26% (20)	--	41% (31)	1%	2%	
February 10	Virginia (primary)	82	9%	7%	27% (29)	--	52% (53)	1%	3%	
February 14	District of Columbia² (caucus)	16	1%^{4}	17%^{4} (3)	10%	--	47% (9)	3%	20% (4)	
February 14	Nevada (caucus)	24	--	17% (2)	10%	--	63% (18)	7%	1%	
February 17	Wisconsin (primary)	72	2%	18% (13)	34% (24)	--	40% (30)	3%	2%	
February 24	Hawaii (caucus)	20	1%^{4}	7%^{4}	13%^{4}	--	47%^{4} (12)	31%^{4} (8)	--	
February 24	Idaho³ (caucus)	18	--	11%	22% (6)	--	54% (12)	6%	--	
February 24	Utah (primary)	23	1%^{4}	4%	30% (3)	--	55% (5)	7%	--	
March 2 (Super Tuesday)	California (primary)	370	2%^{4}	4%	20% (82)	1%^{4}	64% (288)	5%	4%	
March 2 (Super Tuesday)	Connecticut (primary)	49	1%^{4}	4%	24% (14)	--	58% (35)	3%	3%	
March 2 (Super Tuesday)	Georgia (primary)	86	1%^{4}	2%	42% (32)	--	47% (37)	1%	6%	
March 2 (Super Tuesday)	Maryland (primary)	69	1%^{4}	3%	26% (13)	--	60% (26)	2%	5%	
March 2 (Super Tuesday)	Massachusetts (primary)	93	1%^{4}	3%	18% (13)	--	72% (80)	4%	1%	
March 2 (Super Tuesday)	Minnesota (caucus)	72	--	2%	27% (22)	--	51% (41)	17% (9)	1%	
March 2 (Super Tuesday)	New York (primary)	236	1%^{4}	20,471 3%	143,960 20% (54)	1%^{4}	437,754 61% (174)	36,680 5%	8% (8)	
March 2 (Super Tuesday)	Ohio (primary)	140	1%^{4}	3%	34% (55)	1%^{4}	52% (81)	9% (4)	--	
March 2 (Super Tuesday)	Rhode Island (primary)	21	1%^{4}	4%	19% (4)	--	71% (17)	3%	--	
March 2 (Super Tuesday)	Vermont (primary)	15	3%^{4}	53%^{4} (9)	6%^{4}	--	31%^{4} (6)	4%	--	
March 9	American Samoa (caucus)	3	--	--	--	--	83% (6)	17%	--	
March 9	Florida (primary)	177	1%	3%	10% (3)	1%	77% (119)	2%	3%	
March 9	Louisiana (primary)	60	4%	5%	16% (10)	--	70% (42)	1%	--	
March 9	Mississippi (primary)	33	2%	3%	7%	--	78% (33)	1%	5%	
March 9	Texas (primary)	195	2%	5%	14% (11)	1%	67% (62)	2%	4%	
March 13	Kansas (caucus)	33	1%	7% (1)	9%	--	72% (32)	10%	--	
March 16	Illinois (primary)	156	2%	4%	11% (2)	--	72% (154)	2%	3%	
March 20	Alaska (caucus)	13	--	11%	3%	--	48% (8)	27% (5)	--	
March 20	Wyoming (caucus)	13	--	3%	5%	--	77% (13)	6%	1%	
March 27	Democrats Abroad^{5} (caucus)	7	10%	19% (2.5)	9%	--	56% (4.5)	5%	1%	
April 13	Colorado (caucus)	54	--	2%	1%	--	64% (39)	13% (4)	--	
April 17	North Carolina (caucus)	90	--	6%	52% (57)	--	27% (29)	12% (4)	3%	
April 17	Virgin Islands (caucus)	3	--	--	--	--	-- (3)	--	--	
April 24	Guam (caucus)	3	--	--	--	--	77% (3)	--	--	
April 27	Pennsylvania (primary)	151	--	10% (1)	10%	--	74% (120)	4%	--	
May 4	Indiana (primary)	67	6%	7%	11%	--	73% (62)	2%	--	
May 11	Nebraska (primary)	24	--	7%	14%	--	73% (24)	2%	2%	
May 11	West Virginia (primary)	28	3%	4%	13%	--	70% (28)	2%	--	
May 18	Arkansas (primary)	36	--	--	--	--	66% (29)	5%	--	
May 18	Kentucky (primary)	49	3%	4%	14%	--	60% (44)	2%	2%	
May 18	Oregon (primary)	46	--	--	--	--	81% (38)	17% (4)	--	
June 1	Alabama (primary)	54	--	--	--	--	75% (47)	4%	--	
June 1	South Dakota (primary)	14	--	6%	--	--	82% (14)	2%	--	
June 6	Puerto Rico (caucus)	51	--	--	--	--	-- (51)	--	--	
June 8	Montana (primary)	15	4%	--	9%	--	68% (15)	11%	--	
June 8	New Jersey (primary)	107	--	--	--	--	92% (106)	4%	--	
Color Key: / 1st place (delegates earned) / 2nd place (delegates earned) / 3rd place (delegates earned) / Withdrawn										

Notes:

¹ Total delegate count includes superdelegates, delegates not assigned directly from primary or caucus results. State delegate counts include only those delegates assigned as a result of the state primary or caucus.
² January 14 was a non-binding primary (no delegates apportioned). Ten of the District of Columbia's pledged delegates were awarded at ward-level caucuses on February 14; the other six were awarded based on the February 14 results in a convention on March 6.
³ Only local delegates were selected at the Iowa and Idaho caucuses. National delegates were selected later.
^{4} These figures are based on correctly rounded percentages based on complete counts directly from the state parties and from The Washington Post. These figures differ slightly from those reported in most major media outlets (including some linked at the bottom of the page), where percentages have been slightly mis-stated for some candidates in some elections (either by applying inconsistent rounding or by inconsistently excluding minor candidates or candidates who had dropped out).
^{5} Expatriate Democrats, represented the Democrats Abroad organization, held their 2004 caucus on April 7 in Edinburgh, Scotland.

=== Counties carried ===

Kerry
- 20–30%
- 30–40%
- 40–50%
- 50–60%
- 60–70%
- 70–80%
- 80–90%
- 90–100%
Edwards
- 20–30%
- 30–40%
- 40–50%
- 50–60%
- 60–70%
- 70–80%
- 80–90%
- 90–100%
Dean
- 30–40%
- 40–50%
- 50–60%
- 60–70%
- 90–100%
Clark
- 30–40%
- 40–50%
Kucinich
- 30–40%
- 40–50%
- 50–60%
Sharpton
- 60–70%
Uncommitted
- Uncommitted
Tie
No votes

John Kerry
John Edwards
Howard Dean
Wesley Clark
Dennis Kucinich
Al Sharpton
Uncommitted
Tie
No results

=== Nationwide ===
There were 4,353 total delegates to the 2004 Democratic National Convention, of which 802 were superdelegates: party leaders, even including some of the candidates, who were not bound by any state's primary or caucus votes and could change their support at any time. A candidate needed 2,162 delegates to become the nominee. Except for the Northern Mariana Islands and Midway Atoll, all states, territories, and other inhabited areas of the United States offered delegates to the 2004 Democratic National Convention. John Kerry won 4,255 votes at the convention, including those won by all of his former rivals except Dennis Kucinich, who received 37 votes. There were 26 abstentions.

Summary of the election results
Candidates	Votes	%	Delegates
John Kerry	9,871,270	61%	2573.5
John Edwards	3,133,899	19%	559
Howard Dean	894,367	5%	167.5
Dennis Kucinich	617,264	4%	40
Wesley Clark	536,148	3%	60
Al Sharpton	384,766	2%	26
Other	744,178	5%	0
Total	16,181,892	100%	4322
Source: Dave Leip's Atlas of U.S. Presidential Elections

== See also ==
- 2004 Republican Party presidential primaries
- Timeline of the 2004 United States presidential election
