= 2004 Kansas Democratic presidential caucuses =

- March 13, 2004

41 Democratic National Convention delegates (33 pledged, 8 unpledged) The number of pledged delegates received is determined by the popular vote
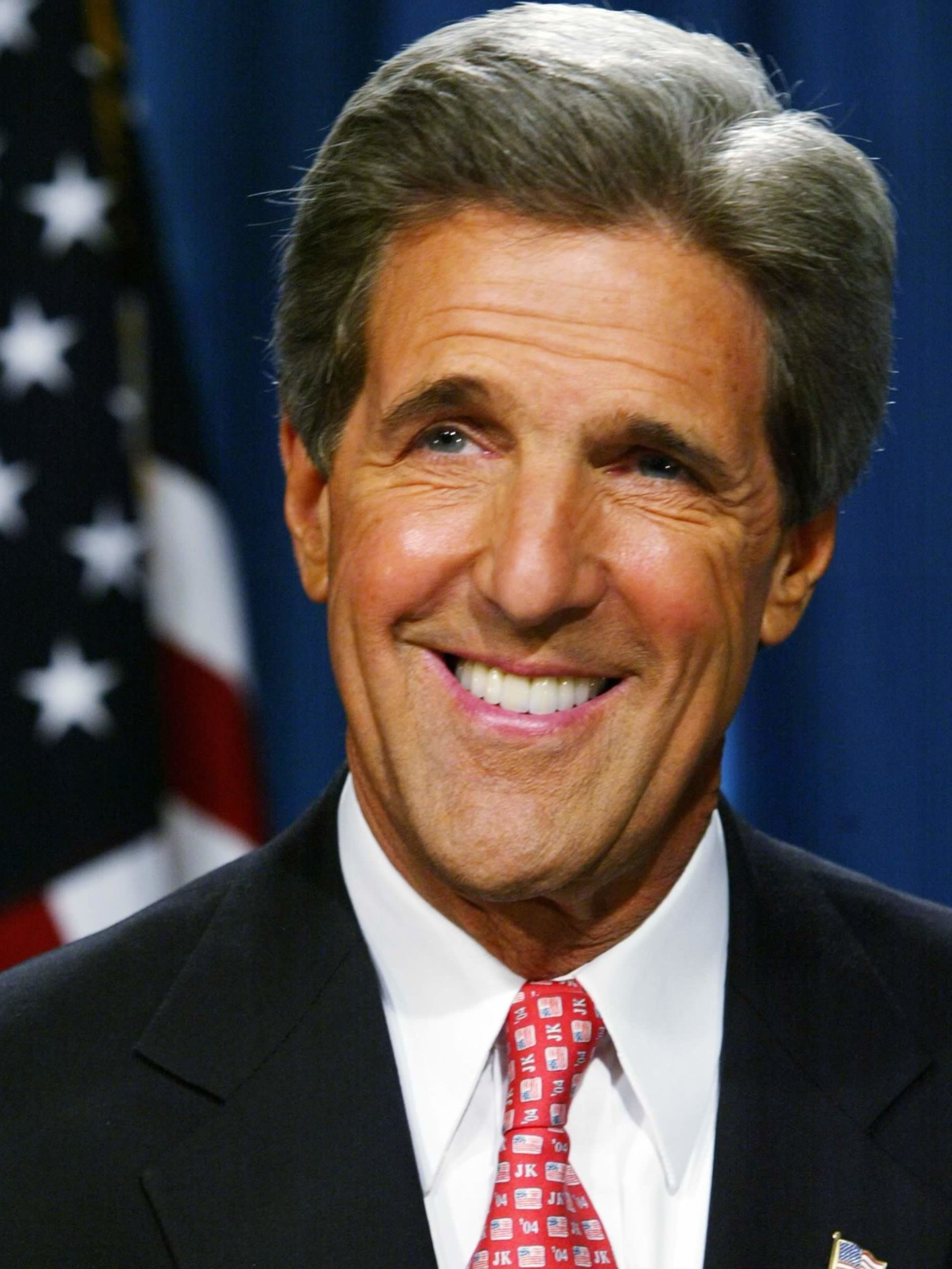

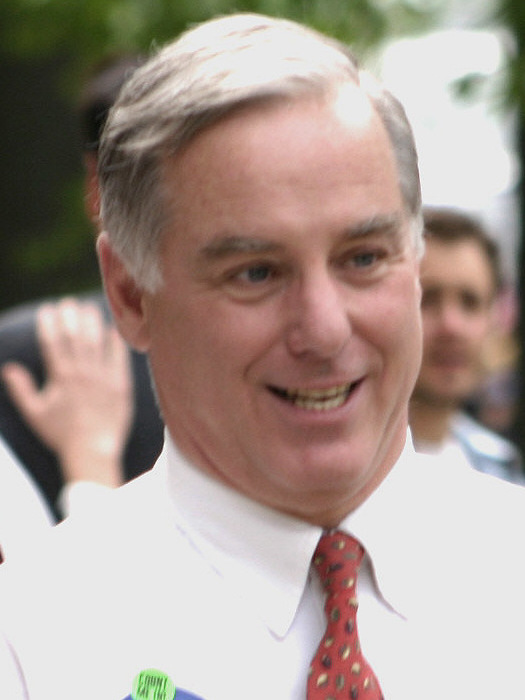

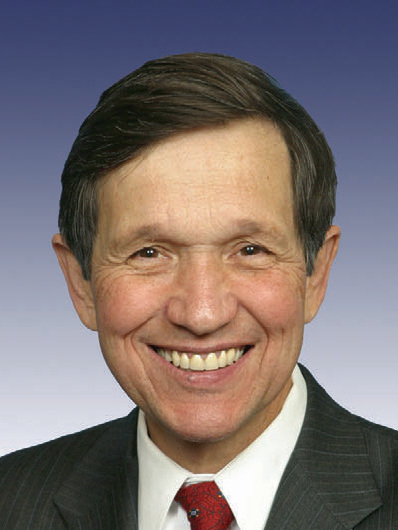

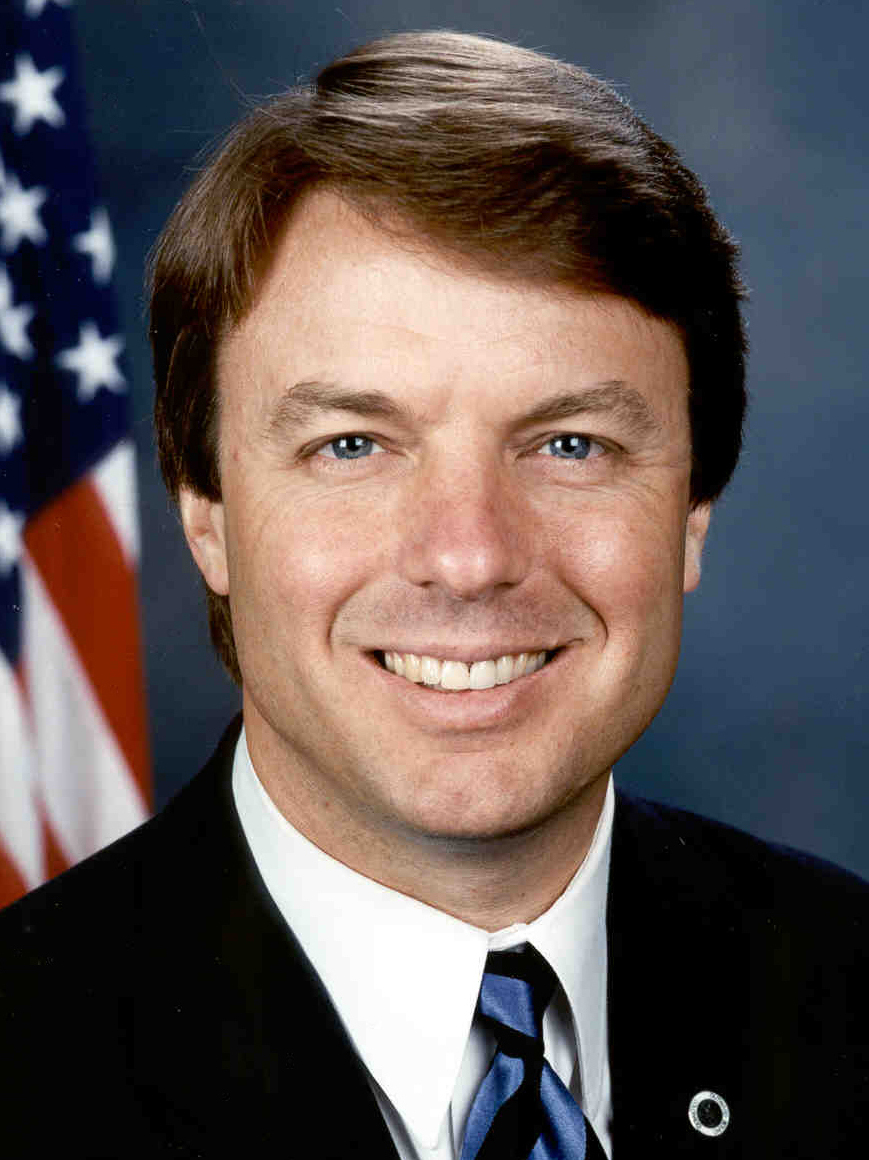
Candidate	John Kerry	Howard Dean (withdrawn)
Home state	Massachusetts	Vermont
Delegate count	32	1
RCDs	289	27
Percentage	71.89%	6.72%
Candidate	Dennis Kucinich	John Edwards (withdrawn)
Home state	Ohio	North Carolina
Delegate count	0	0
RCDs	41	35
Percentage	10.20%	8.71%

The 2004 Kansas Democratic presidential caucuses were held on March 13 in the U.S. state of Kansas as one of the Democratic Party's statewide nomination contests ahead of the 2004 presidential election.

== Results ==
2004 Kansas Democratic presidential caucuses
Candidate	Regional caucus delegates	%	Delegates
John Kerry	289	71.89	32
Howard Dean (withdrawn)	27	6.72	1
Dennis Kucinich	41	10.20	0
John Edwards (withdrawn)	35	8.71	0
Uncommitted	7	1.74	0
Wesley Clark (withdrawn)	3	0.75	0
Total	402	100%	33
