= 2004 Minnesota Democratic presidential caucuses =

- March 2, 2004

86 Democratic National Convention delegates (72 pledged, 14 unpledged) The number of pledged delegates received is determined by the popular vote
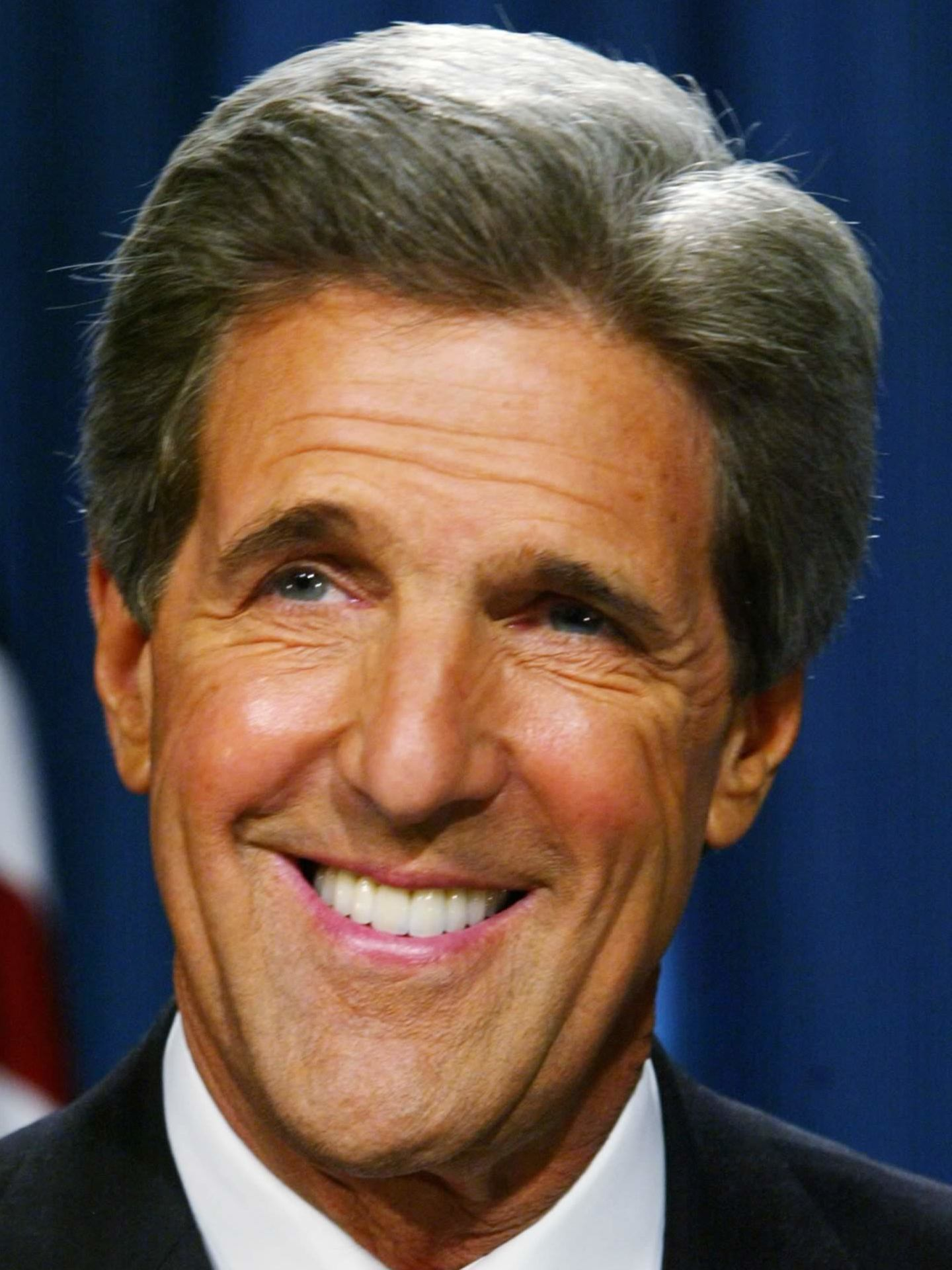

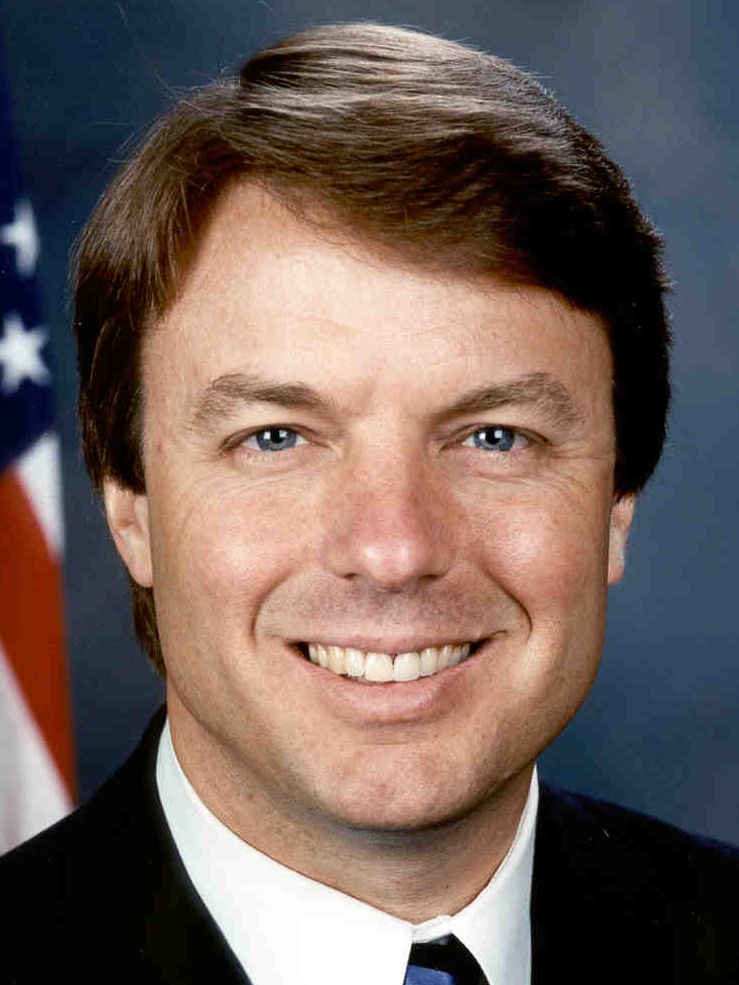

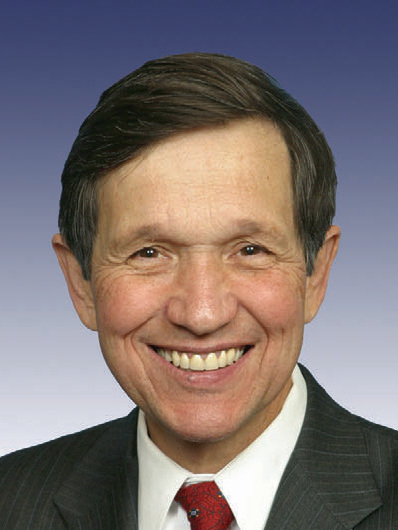
Candidate	John Kerry	John Edwards (withdrawn)	Dennis Kucinich
Home state	Massachusetts	North Carolina	Ohio
Delegate count	41	22	9
Popular vote	27,854	14,841	9,336
Percentage	50.71%	27.02%	17.00%
- Election results by congressional district Kerry: 40–50% 50–60% 60–70%

The 2004 Minnesota Democratic caucuses were held on March 2 in the U.S. state of Minnesota as one of the Democratic Party's statewide nomination contests ahead of the 2004 presidential election.

== Results ==
2004 Minnesota Democratic presidential caucuses
Candidate	Votes	%	Delegates
John Kerry	27,854	50.71%	41
John Edwards (withdrawn)	14,841	27.02%	22
Dennis Kucinich	9,336	17.00	9
Uncommitted	1,233	2.24	0
Howard Dean (withdrawn)	1,079	1.96	0
Al Sharpton	338	0.62	0
Wesley Clark (withdrawn)	177	0.32	0
Joe Lieberman (withdrawn)	73	0.13	0
Total	54,931	100%	72
