= 2004 Kentucky Democratic presidential primary =

- May 18, 2004

49 pledged delegates to the 2004 Democratic National Convention
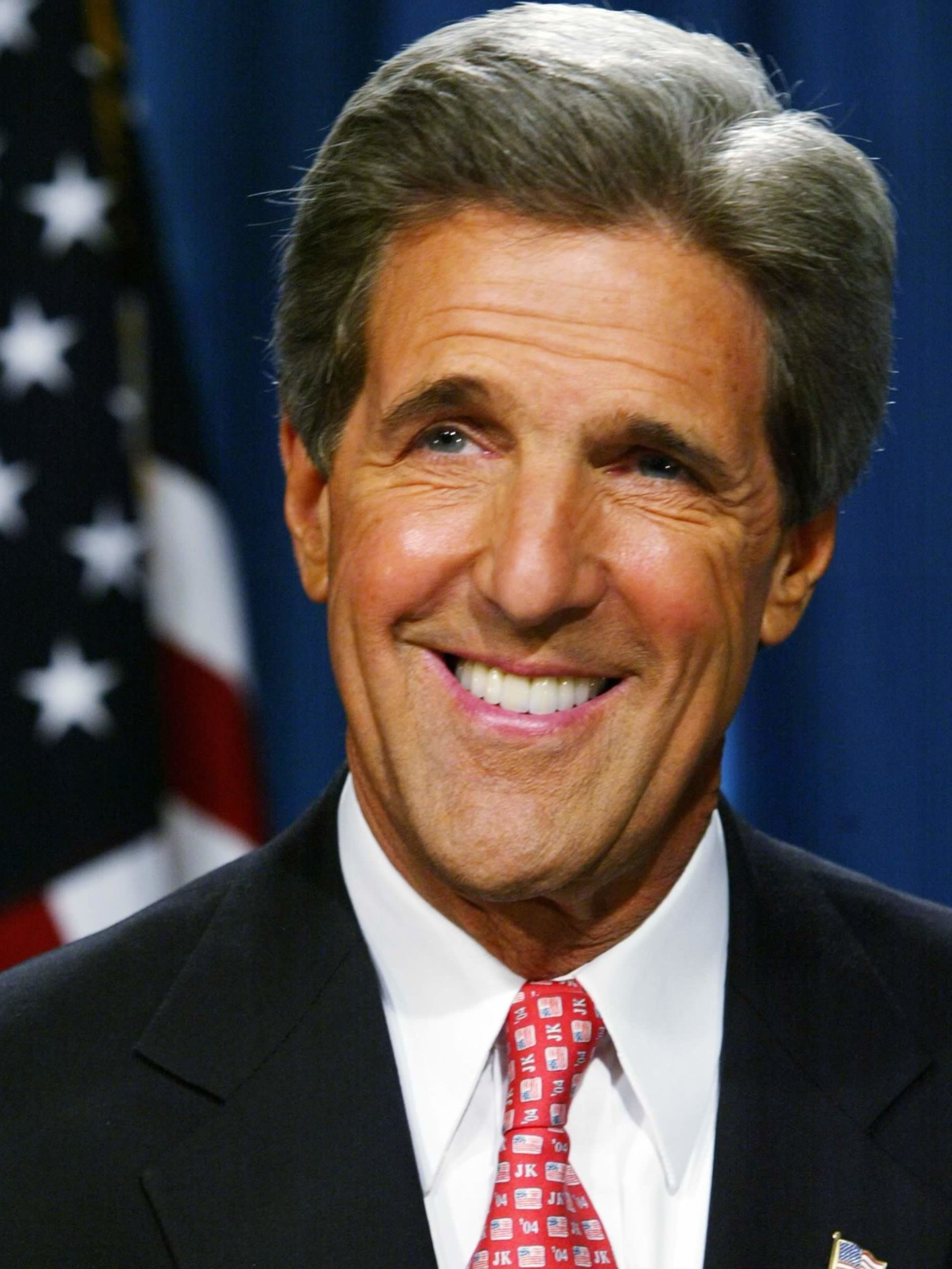

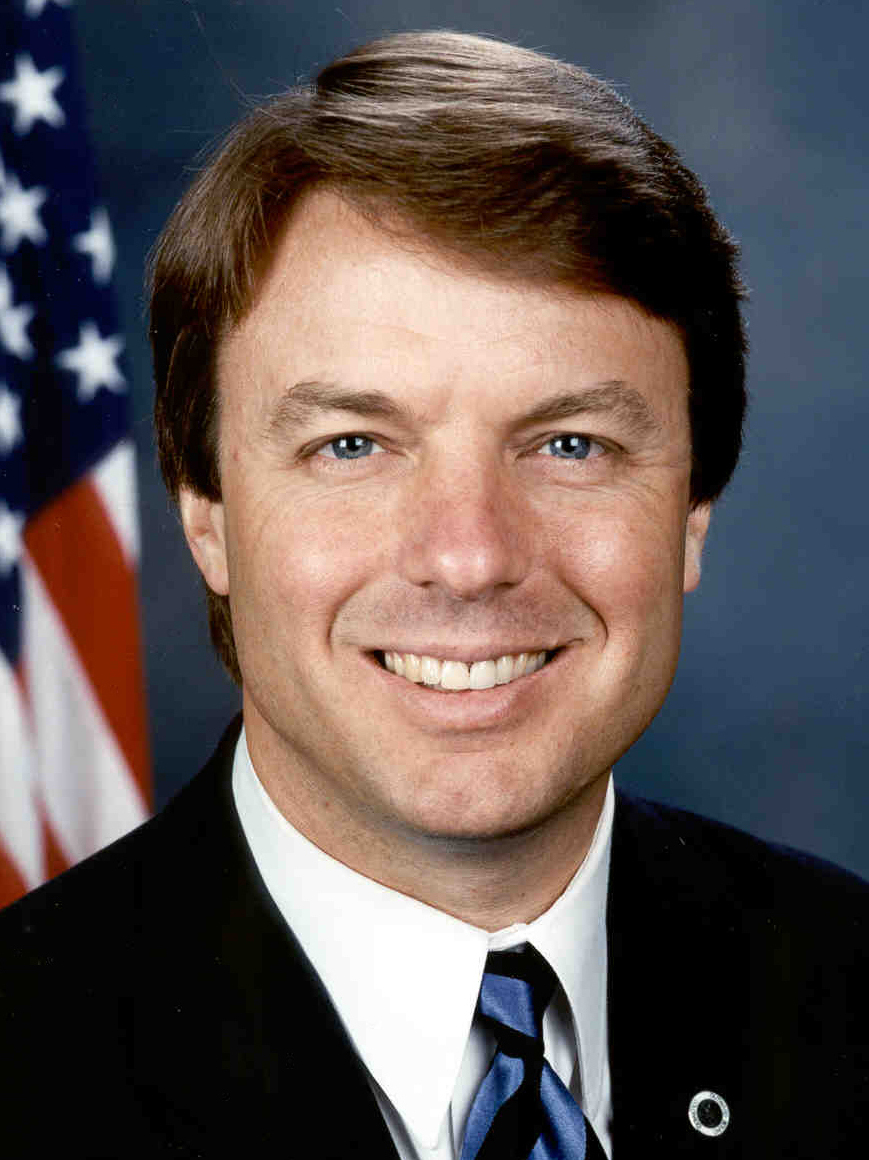

Candidate	John Kerry	John Edwards (withdrawn)	Uncommitted
Home state	Massachusetts	North Carolina	–
Delegate count	45	4	0
Popular vote	138,175	33,403	21,199
Percentage	60.10%	14.53%	9.22%
- Primary results by county Kerry: 40–50% 50–60% 60–70% 70–80%

The 2004 Kentucky Democratic presidential primary was held on May 18 in the U.S. state of Kentucky as one of the Democratic Party's statewide nomination contests ahead of the 2004 presidential election.

== Results ==
2004 Kentucky Democratic presidential primary
Candidate	Votes	%	Delegates
John Kerry	138,175	60.10	45
John Edwards (withdrawn)	33,403	14.53	4
Uncommitted	21,199	9.22	0
Joe Lieberman (withdrawn)	11,062	4.81	0
Howard Dean (withdrawn)	8,222	3.58	0
Wesley Clark (withdrawn)	6,519	2.84	0
Al Sharpton (withdrawn)	5,022	2.18	0
Dennis Kucinich	4,508	1.96	0
Lyndon LaRouche	1,806	0.79	0
Total	229,916	100%	49
