= 2004 Montana Democratic presidential primary =

- June 8, 2004

21 Democratic National Convention delegates (15 pledged, 6 unpledged) The number of pledged delegates received is determined by the popular vote
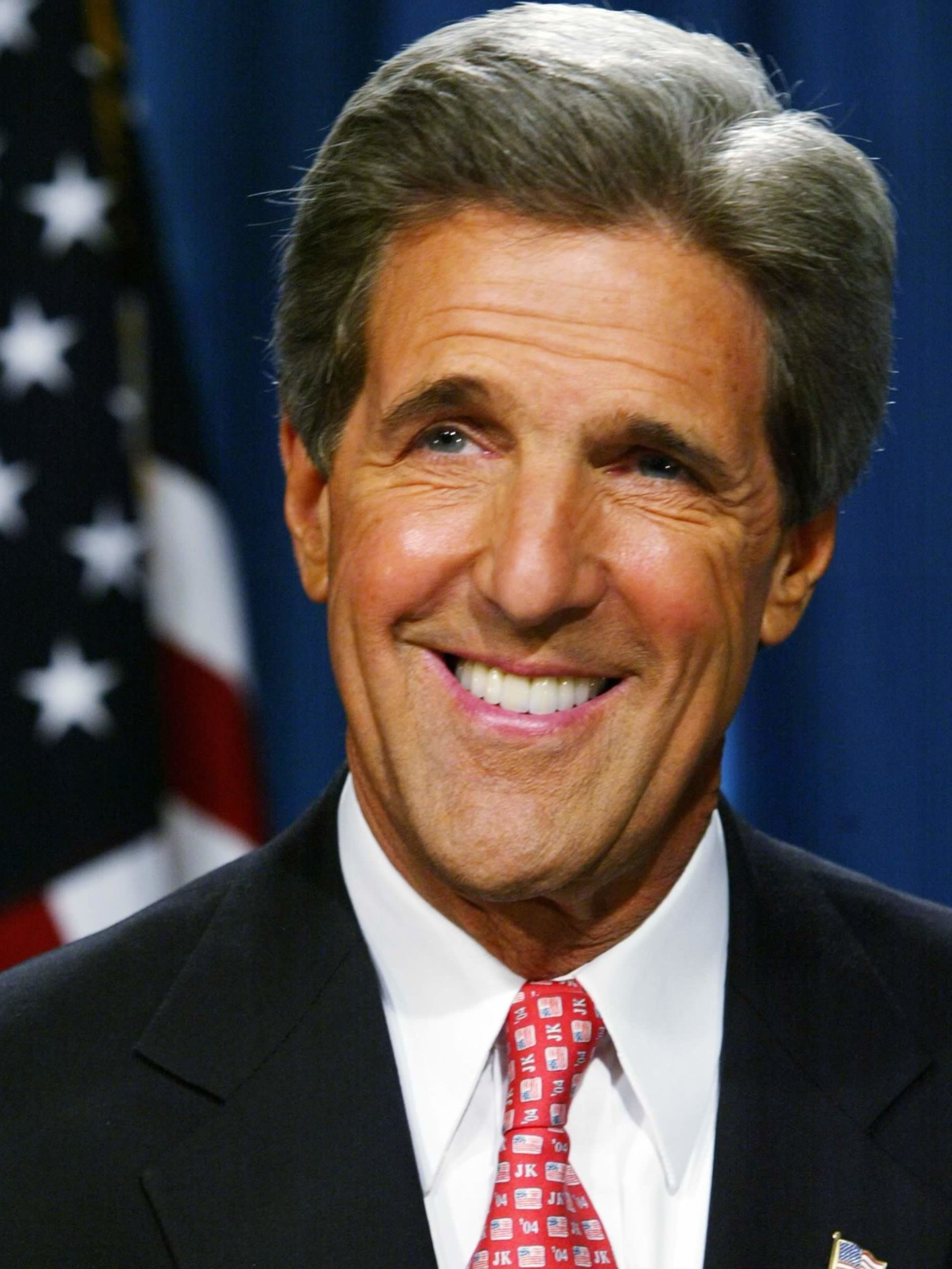

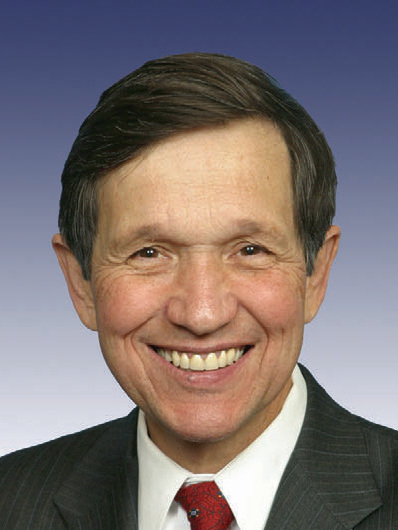

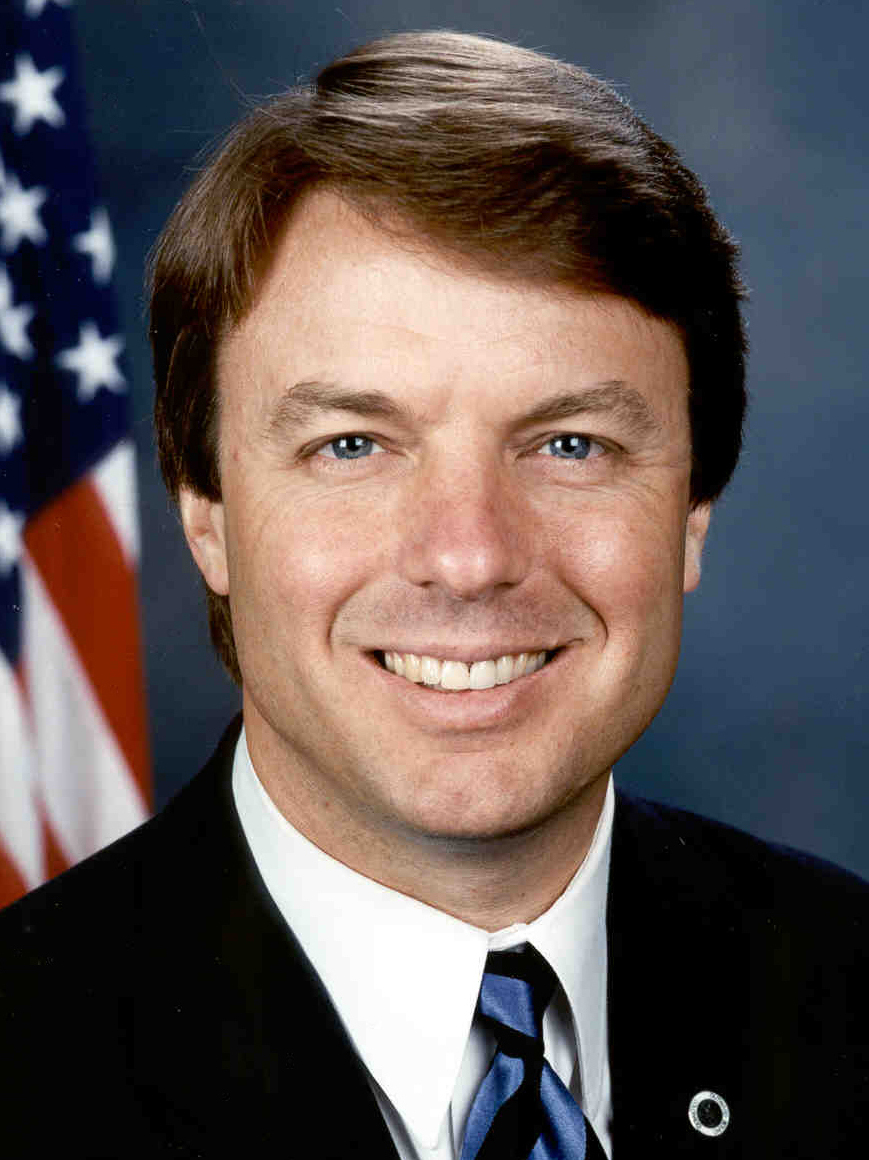

Candidate	John Kerry	Dennis Kucinich
Home state	Massachusetts	Ohio
Delegate count	15	0
Popular vote	63,611	9,686
Percentage	68.00%	10.35%
Candidate	John Edwards (withdrawn)	No preference
Home state	North Carolina	–
Delegate count	0	0
Popular vote	6,899	17,437
Percentage	9.10%	7.38%
- Primary results by county Kerry: 50–60% 60–70% 70–80% 80–90%

The 2004 Montana Democratic presidential primary was held on June 8 in the U.S. state of Montana as one of the Democratic Party's statewide nomination contests ahead of the 2004 presidential election.

== Results ==
2004 Montana Democratic presidential primary
Candidate	Votes	%	Delegates
John Kerry	63,611	68.00	15
Dennis Kucinich	9,686	10.35	0
John Edwards (withdrawn)	8,516	9.10	0
No preference	6,899	7.38	0
Wesley Clark (withdrawn)	4,081	4.36	0
Lyndon LaRouche	750	0.80	0
Total	93,543	100%	15
