= 2004 Maine Democratic presidential caucuses =

The 2004 Maine Democratic presidential caucuses took place on February 8, 2004, as part of the 2004 United States Democratic presidential primaries. The delegate allocation is Proportional. the candidates are awarded delegates in proportion to the percentage of votes received and is open to registered Democrats only. A total of 24 (of 34) delegates are awarded proportionally.

2004 Maine Democratic presidential caucuses
Party	Candidate	Votes	Percentage	Delegates	
Democratic	John Kerry	8,296	44.2%	11	
Democratic	Howard Dean	5,200	27.7%	7	
Democratic	Dennis Kucinich	2,954	15.8%	6	
Democratic	John Edwards	1,395	7.4%	0	
Democratic	Wesley Clark	660	3.5%	0	
Democratic	Uncommitted	229	1.2%	0	
Democratic	Al Sharpton	19	0.2%	0	
Democratic	Joe Lieberman	7	0.0%	0	
Totals			100.00%	24	
Voter turnout			%		—

== See also ==
- 2004 Democratic Party presidential primaries
