= 2004 Florida Democratic presidential primary =

- March 9, 2004

201 Democratic National Convention delegates (177 pledged, 24 unpledged) The number of pledged delegates received is determined by the popular vote
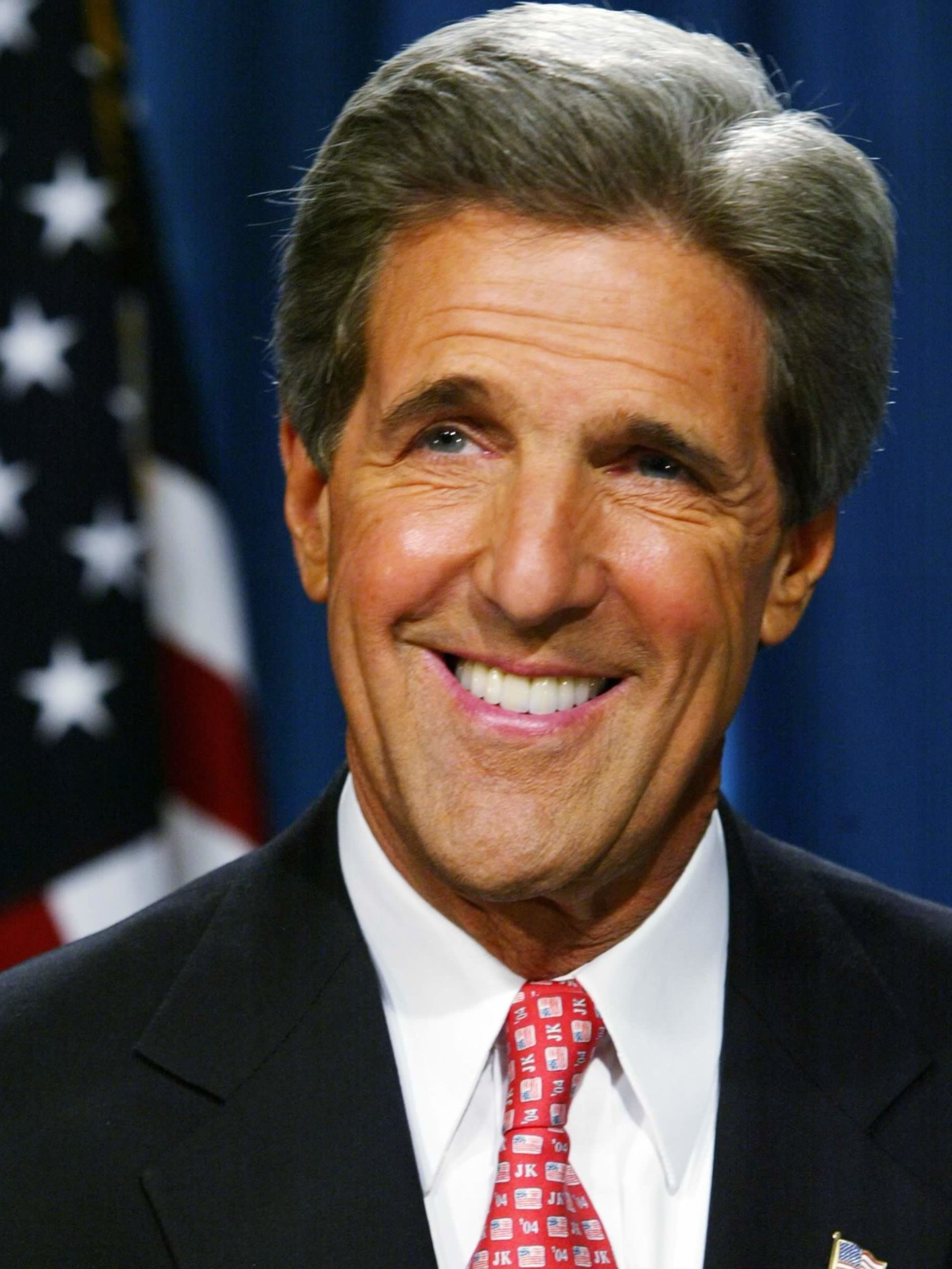

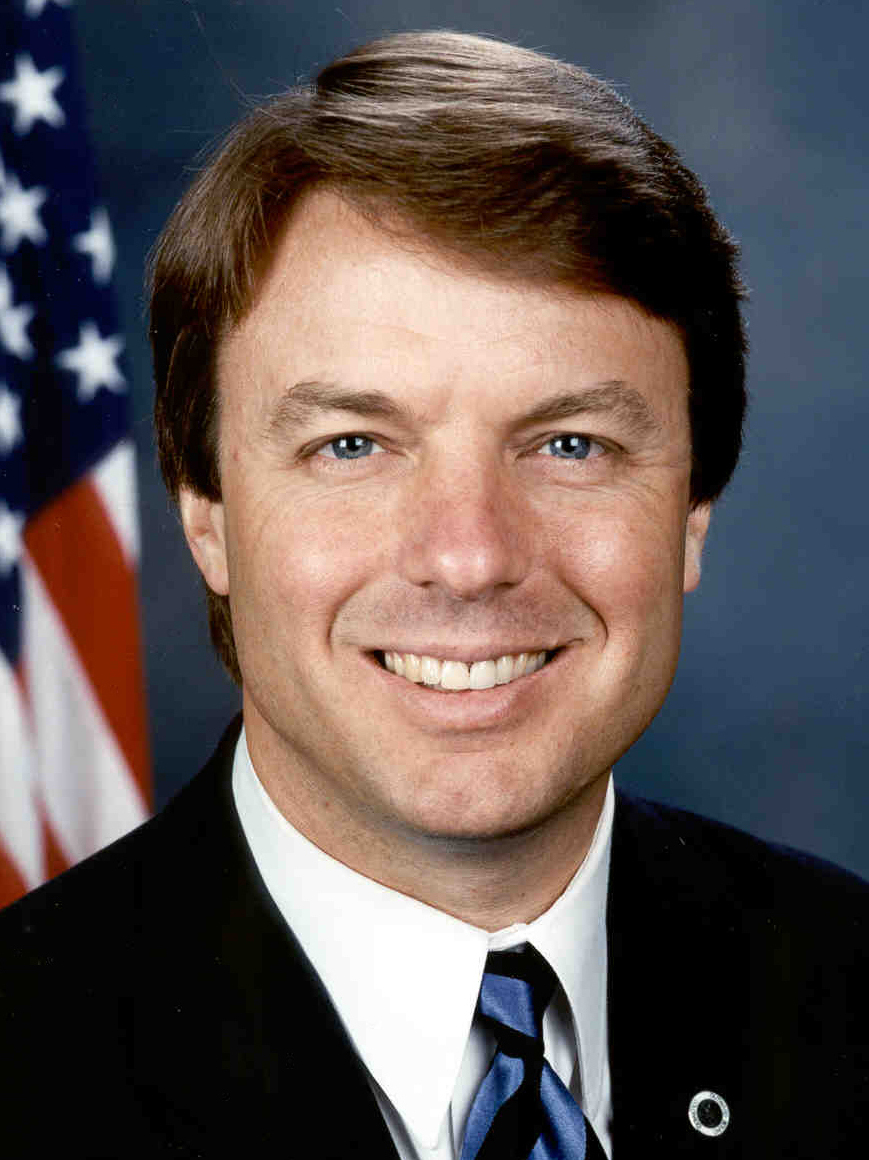
Candidate	John Kerry	John Edwards (withdrawn)
Home state	Massachusetts	North Carolina
Delegate count	174	3
Popular vote	581,672	75,703
Percentage	77.17%	10.04%
- Kerry: 40-50% 50-60% 60-70% 70-80% 80-90%

The 2004 Florida Democratic presidential primary was held on March 9 in the U.S. state of Florida as one of the Democratic Party's statewide nomination contests ahead of the 2004 presidential election.

== Results ==
2004 Florida Democratic primary
Candidate	Votes	%	Delegates
John Kerry	581,672	77.17	174
John Edwards (withdrawn)	75,703	10.04	3
Al Sharpton	21,031	2.79	0
Howard Dean (withdrawn)	20,834	2.76	0
Dennis Kucinich	17,198	2.28	0
Joe Lieberman (withdrawn)	14,287	1.90	0
Wesley Clark (withdrawn)	10,226	1.36	0
Carol Moseley Braun (withdrawn)	6,789	0.90	0
Dick Gephardt (withdrawn)	6,022	0.80	0
Total	753,762	100%	177
