= 2004 Democrats Abroad presidential caucuses =

- February 6–9, 2004

9 Democratic National Convention delegates (7 pledged, 2 unpledged) The number of pledged delegates received is determined by the popular vote
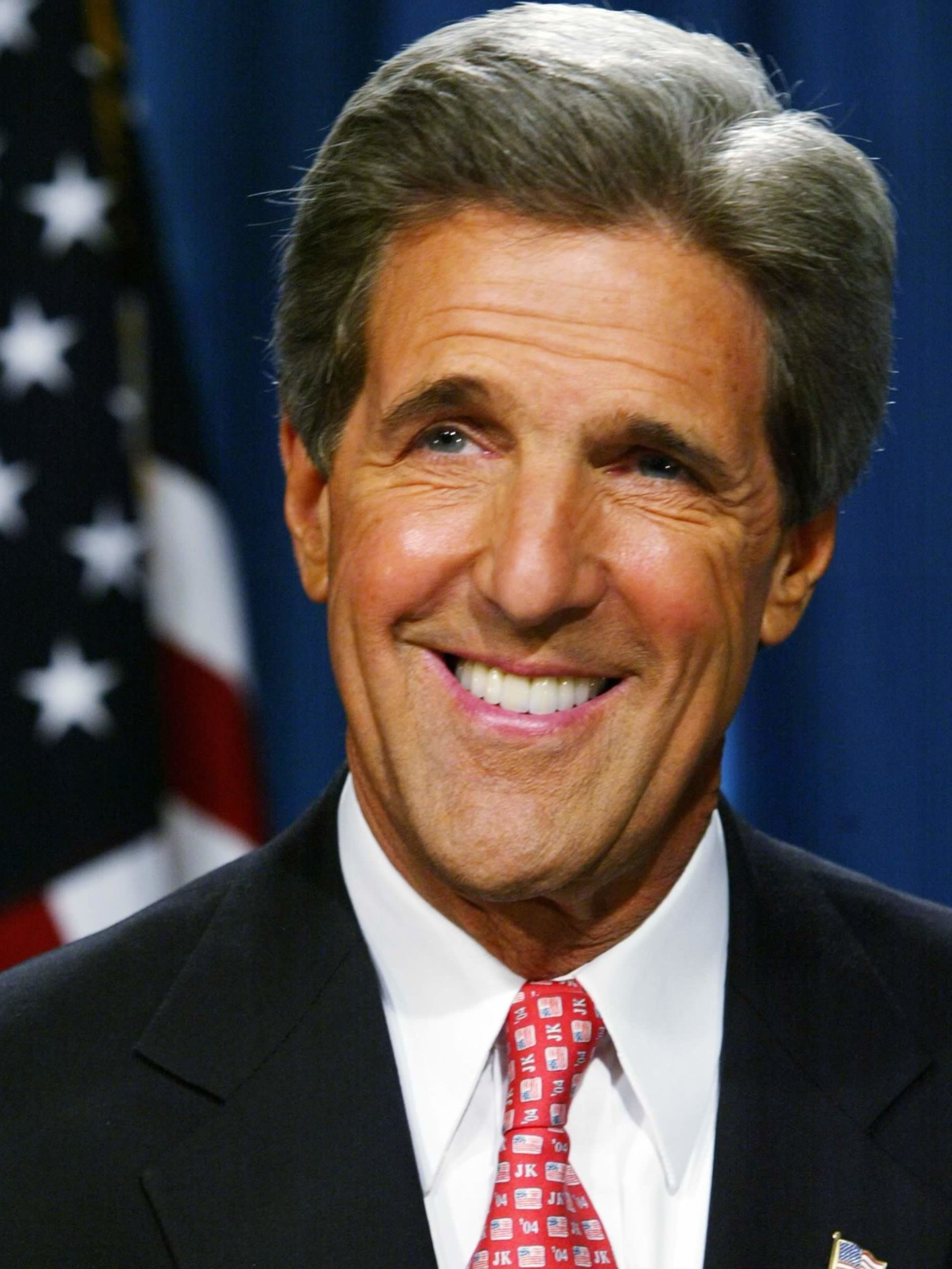

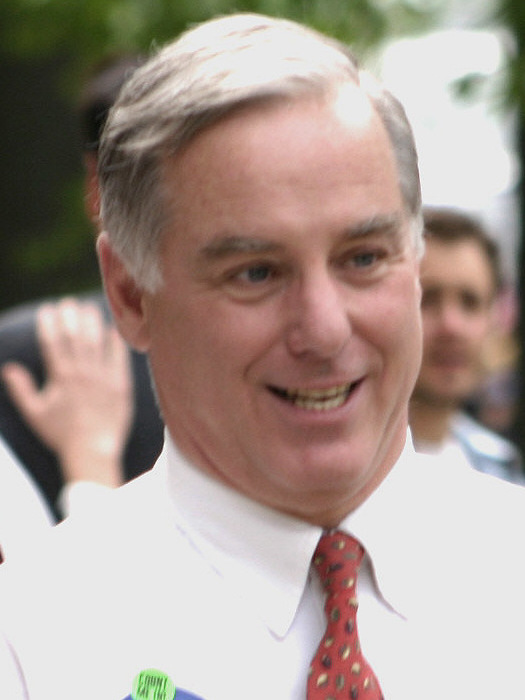

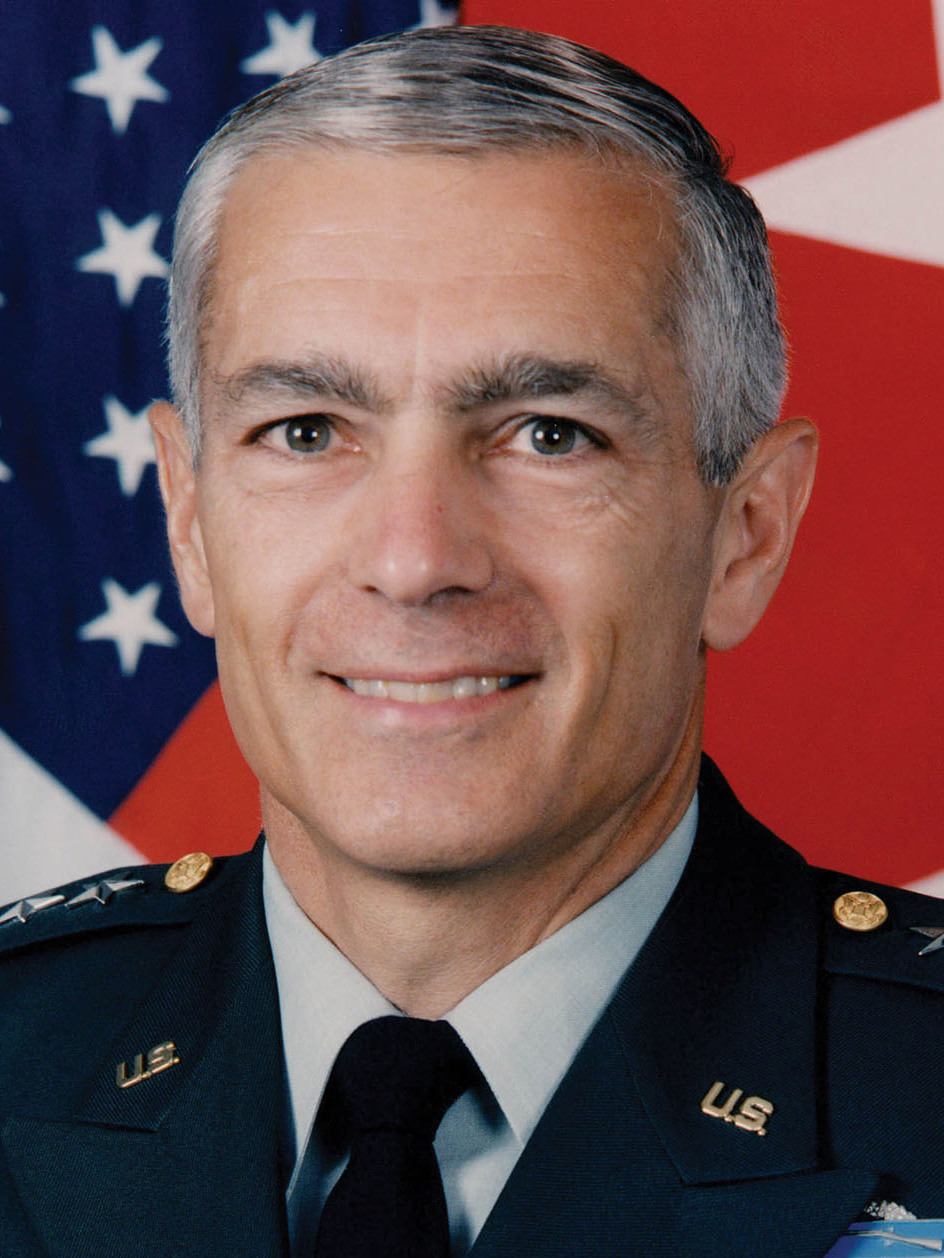

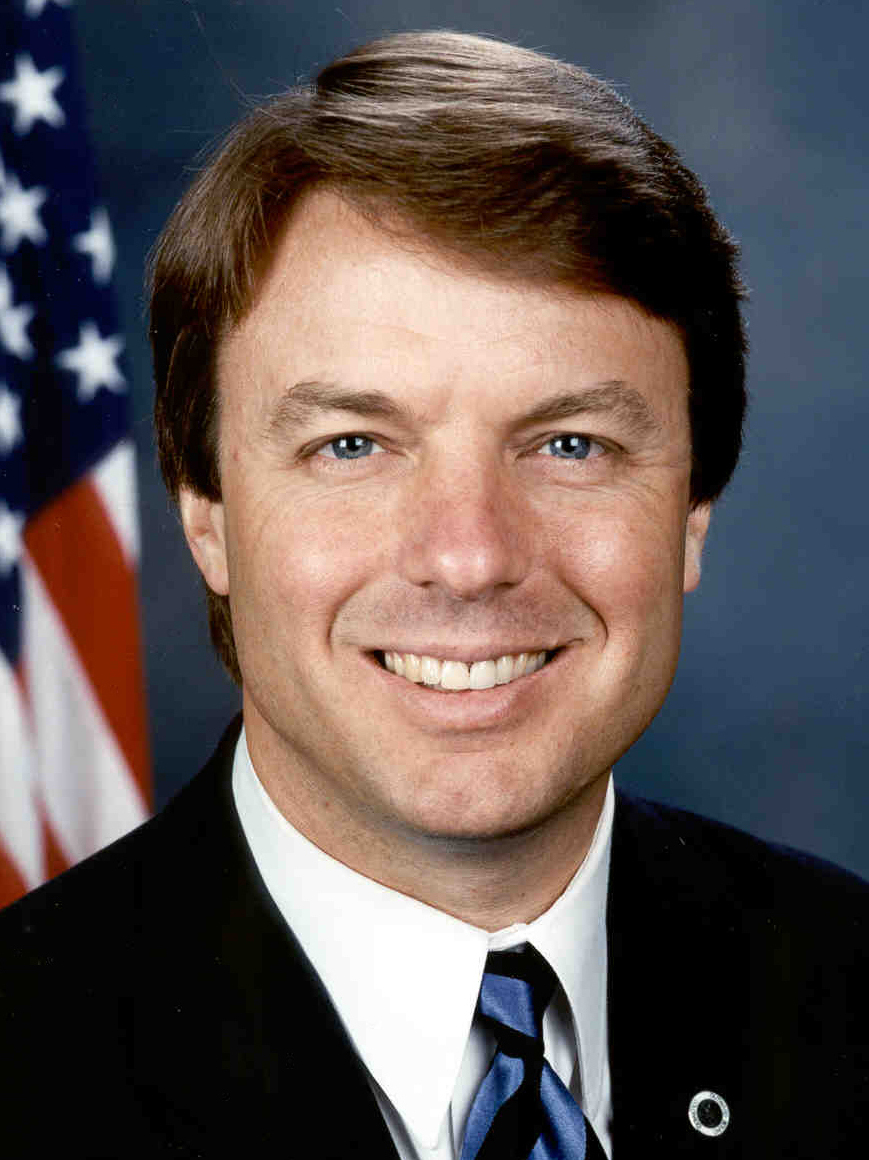
Candidate	John Kerry	Howard Dean
Home state	Massachusetts	Vermont
Delegate count	4½	2½
Popular vote	1,254	422
Percentage	56.01%	18.85%
Candidate	Wesley Clark	John Edwards
Home state	Arkansas	North Carolina
Delegate count	0	0
Popular vote	226	211
Percentage	10.09%	9.42%
Election results by country
John Kerry
Howard Dean
Kerry/Dean tie
N/A

The 2004 Democrats Abroad presidential caucuses were held from February 6 to 9, 2004, as one of the Democratic Party's nomination contests ahead of the 2004 presidential election.

== Results ==
2004 Democrats Abroad caucuses
Candidate	Votes	%	Delegates
John Kerry	1,254	56.01	4½
Howard Dean	422	18.85	2½
Wesley Clark	226	10.09	0
John Edwards	211	9.42	0
Dennis Kucinich	108	4.82	0
Al Sharpton	12	0.54	0
Joe Lieberman (withdrawn)	6	0.27	0
Total	2,239	100%	7
