= 2004 New Jersey Democratic presidential primary =

- June 8, 2004
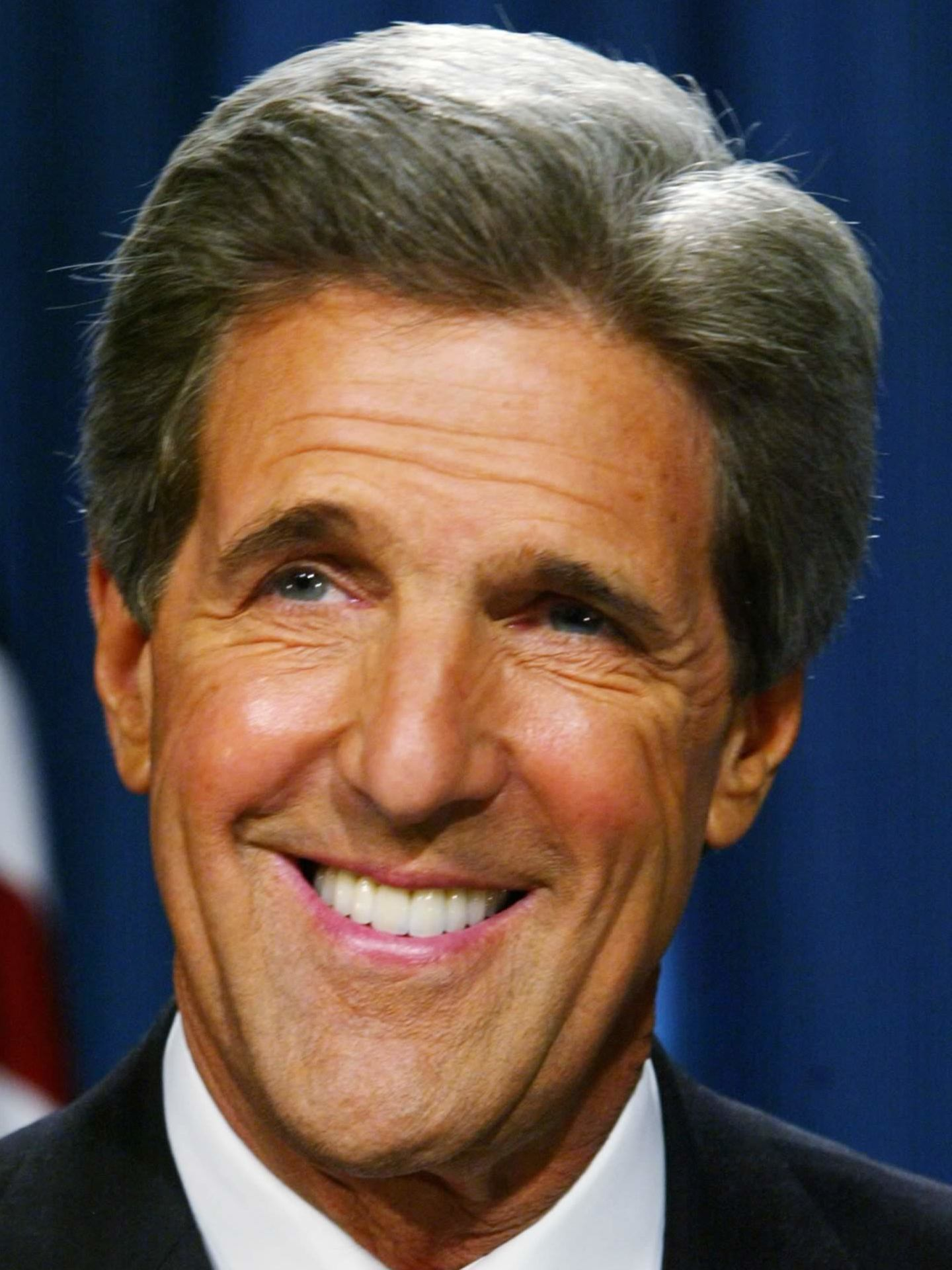
Candidate	John Kerry
Home state	Massachusetts
Delegate count	106
Popular vote	191,816
Percentage	92.14%
- Primary results by county Kerry: 80–90% 90–100%

The 2004 New Jersey Democratic presidential primary was held on June 8, 2004, and featured the two candidates who were still campaigning for the nomination: presumptive nominee Senator John Kerry of Massachusetts and congressman Dennis Kucinich of Ohio. Kerry won a landslide victory at 92% to Kucinich's 4%.

== Polling ==
Poll source	Date(s) administered	Sample size	Margin of error	Wesley Clark	Hillary Clinton	Tom Daschle	Howard Dean	John Edwards	Dick Gephardt	Al Gore	Bob Graham	John Kerry	Dennis Kucinich	Joe Lieberman	Carol Moseley-Braun	Al Sharpton	Other	Undecided
Quinnipiac	December 3–9, 2002	934 RV	±3.2%	–	22%	5%	0%	2%	7%	37%	–	14%	–	5%	–	–	–	6%
Quinnipiac	January 22–27, 2003	294 RV	±5.7%	–	–	–	4%	7%	9%	–	–	18%	–	32%	–	12%	–	17%
Quinnipiac	June 11–16, 2003	272 RV	±5.9%	–	48%	–	3%	3%	7%	–	2%	11%	1%	14%	1%	8%	–	7%
Quinnipiac	June 11–16, 2003	272 RV	±5.9%	–	–	–	6%	3%	13%	–	3%	15%	0%	26%	5%	8%	–	21%
Quinnipiac	September 18–22, 2003	322 RV	±5.5%	8%	41%	–	9%	3%	9%	–	0%	8%	1%	10%	1%	3%	–	6%
Quinnipiac	September 18–22, 2003	322 RV	±5.5%	16%	–	–	12%	4%	13%	–	1%	14%	0%	17%	2%	9%	–	13%
Quinnipiac	November 6–10, 2003	351 RV	±5.2%	9%	42%	–	9%	3%	5%	–	–	9%	0%	10%	1%	2%	–	11%
Quinnipiac	November 6–10, 2003	351 RV	±5.2%	11%	–	–	16%	2%	9%	–	–	15%	0%	16%	6%	5%	–	20%

== Results ==
Candidate	No. State Delegates	Percentage	Potential National delegates
John Kerry	191,816	92.14	106
Dennis Kucinich	9,074	4.36	0
