= Unintimidated (PAC) =

Unintimidated is a pro-Scott Walker super PAC. The PAC was formed in April 2015 by some of Walker's campaign aides to assist with fundraising efforts. It is led by Keith Gilkes, Walker's former chief of staff.

Unintimidated PAC's $1 million donors become members of the "Executive Board" and are promised bi-annual retreats, member-only briefings and conference calls, two private dinners with VIP special guests, and dedicated staff contact to cater to their needs. Other big donors can be members of the "Executive Committee" ($500,000 level) and the "Platinum Membership" ($250,000) and get similar perks.

== Donations received ==
These are among the donations received:

- $150,000 from HF Securities LLC, registered to J. Patrick Hammes, the son of Jon Hammes, Milwaukee Bucks owner and Walker's co-chair of fundraising for his 2016 presidential campaign.

== See also ==
- Peter Fitzgerald (politician), Chairman of Chain Bridge Bank, N.A.
- 501(c)(4) organizations
- 527 group
- Campaign finance in the United States
- Issue advocacy ads
- Lobbying in the United States
- Money loop
- Politics of the United States
- Soft money
- Republican Party presidential candidates, 2016
- Scott Walker presidential campaign, 2016
- Our American Revival (organization)
- Wisconsin Club for Growth
