= Keith Gilkes =

Political strategist

Keith Gilkes is a political strategist. He is head of the political consulting company the Champion Group. He also runs Unintimidated PAC, a pro–Scott Walker super political action committee.

== Background ==
Gilkes is the former chief of staff for Scott Walker, the 45th Governor of Wisconsin. Previously, Gilkes worked for the Wisconsin Legislature as a policy advisor in the state Senate. In 2013, he was considered one of the top 50 Politicos to watch. He is a native of Prairie du Chien, Wisconsin and a graduate of the University of Wisconsin–Madison.

== Career ==
In 2013, Gilkes was a Campaign Excellence Award Winner, earning "Republican - Campaign Manager of the Year," from the American Association of Political Consultants for his efforts with "Friends of Scott Walker" during the 2012 recall.

In September 2012, Gilkes left his administration position as chief of staff to lead efforts assisting Walker's win in a potential recall. Gilkes would be lead adviser to Walker's campaign, but also take on other clients for campaign work. In 2012, Gilkes was cooperative with a John Doe investigation involving a private wireless router system that allegedly was part of a secret email system in the Milwaukee County Courthouse; he had no knowledge of its existence.

In April 2009, Gilkes was Walkers campaign manager.

Formerly, Gilkes was a Legislative aide to Rep. Carol Owens, a policy aide to the Senate Republican Caucus, a deputy executive director for the Committee to Elect a Republican Senate, and campaign manager for Kapanke for State Senate.

As a deputy executive director for CERS, Gilkes was able to hold the number of senate republicans to 18-15 in one of the toughest cycles for the GOP in decades. Holding the number of GOP incumbents to 15 allowed CERS to go on the offense this campaign cycle and pick up 4 seats, more than enough to get back into the majority. In 2006, as deputy executive director for CERS, Gilkes was also notably involved in obtaining a memo from somebody who found it on a copier that showed the Progressive Majority was helping Lehman in his race against McReynolds. The memo also revealed that the state's largest teachers' union, WEAC, had set aside money to assist in individual races but "will never be at the same table as SSDC and efforts will not be coordinated between the two groups." The discovery of the memo raised questions about whether Democrats were using state resources for campaign work since it was discovered in the Capitol.

OneWisconsin reports that after the announcement that Wisconsin would offer Foxconn a $3 billion subsidy to locate a manufacturing plant in Wisconsin, Gilkes accepted a position with a lobby firm employed by Foxconn.

== See also ==
- Peter Fitzgerald (politician), Chairman of Chain Bridge Bank
- Campaign finance in the United States
- Lobbying in the United States
- Money loop
- Politics of the United States
- Soft money
- Republican Party presidential candidates, 2016
- Scott Walker presidential campaign, 2016
- Our American Revival (organization)
- Political campaign staff
