= 2004 Illinois Democratic presidential primary =

- March 16, 2004

186 Democratic National Convention delegates (156 pledged, 30 unpledged) The number of pledged delegates received is determined by the popular vote
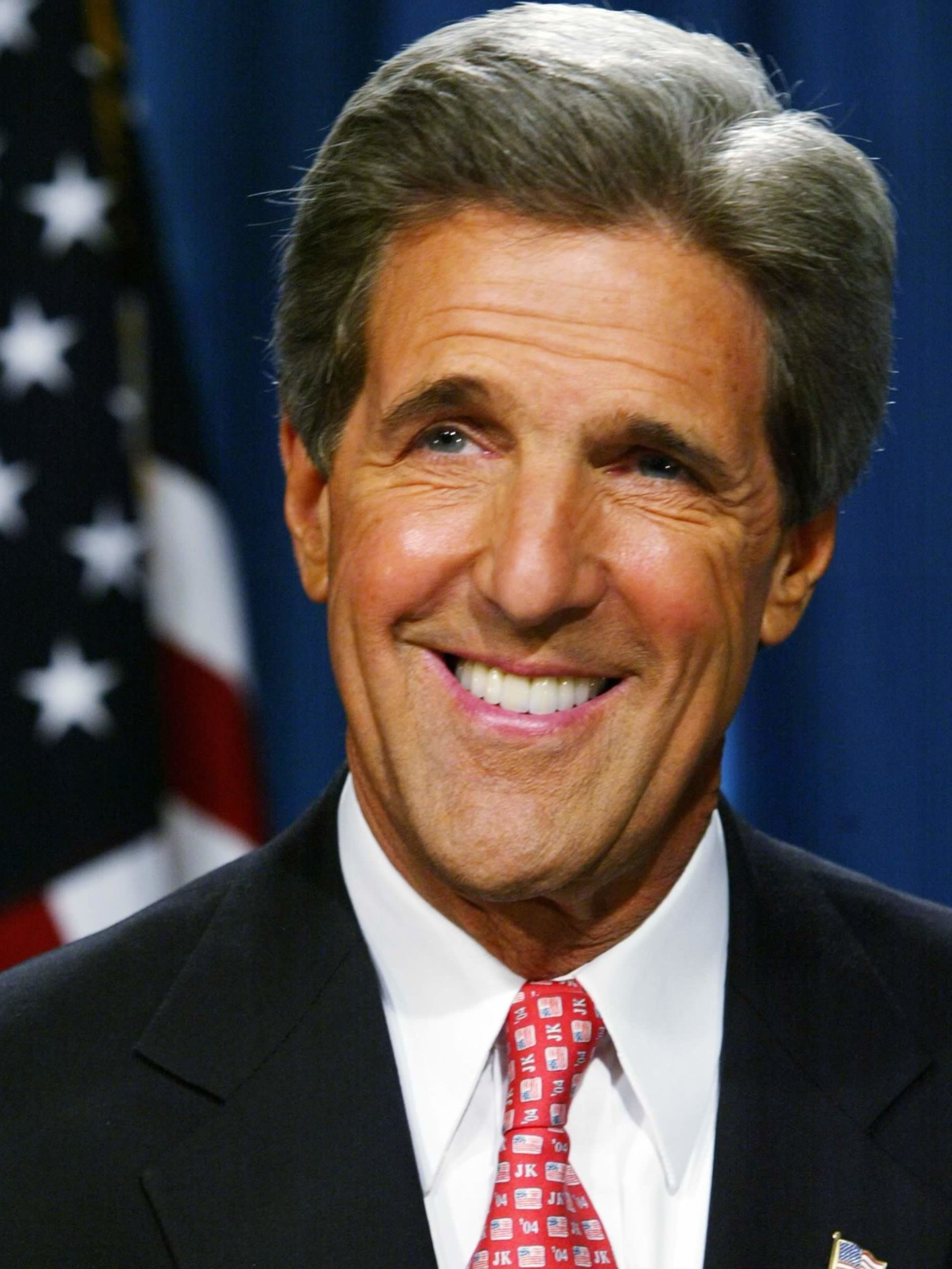

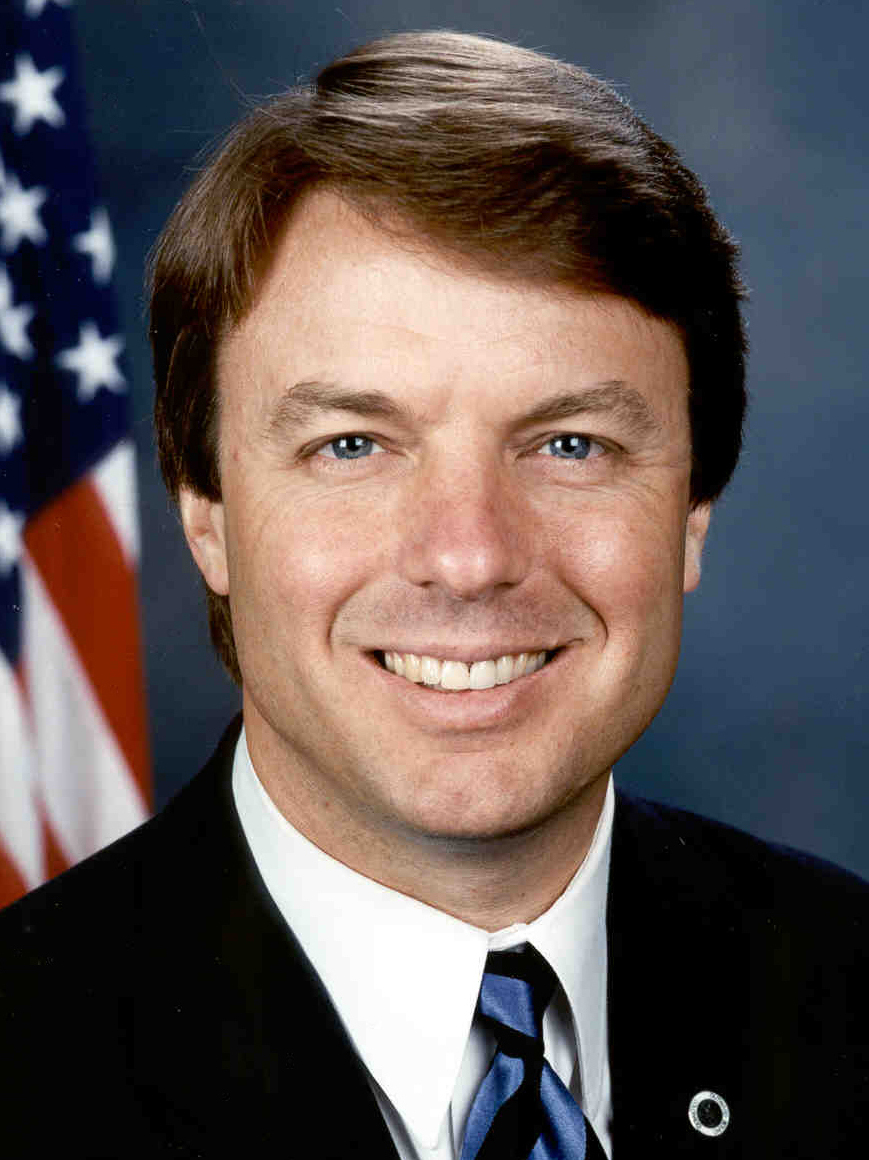
Candidate	John Kerry	John Edwards (withdrawn)
Home state	Massachusetts	North Carolina
Delegate count	155	1
Popular vote	873,230	131,966
Percentage	71.72%	10.84%
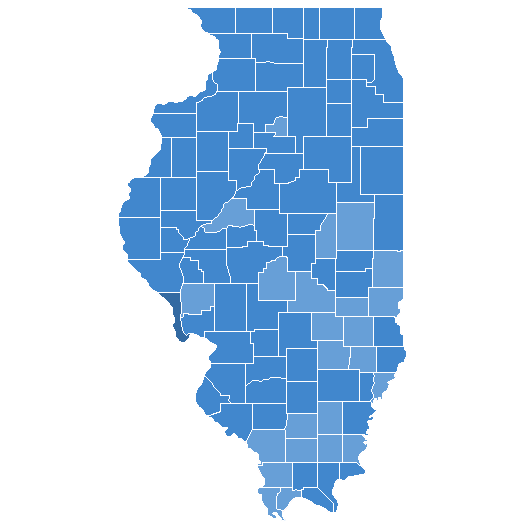
- Results by county Kerry: 60–70% 70–80% 80–90%

The 2004 Illinois Democratic -presidential primary was held on March 16 in the U.S. state of Illinois as one of the Democratic Party's statewide nomination contests ahead of the 2004 presidential election.

== Results ==
2004 Illinois Democratic primary
Candidate	Votes	%	Delegates
John Kerry	873,230	71.72	155
John Edwards (withdrawn)	131,966	10.84	1
Carol Moseley Braun (withdrawn)	53,249	4.37	0
Howard Dean (withdrawn)	47,343	3.89	0
Al Sharpton (withdrawn)	36,123	2.97	0
Dennis Kucinich	28,083	2.31	0
Joe Lieberman (withdrawn)	24,354	2.00	0
Wesley Clark (withdrawn)	19,304	1.59	0
Lyndon LaRouche	3,863	0.32	0
Total	1,217,515	100%	156

== Analysis ==
The Illinois primary occurred after Super Tuesday, which by that point most major candidates contesting John Kerry for the nomination had dropped out. However, John Edwards received a decent share of the vote in southern Illinois as a result of his appeal to rural voters, despite having withdrawn from the race.
