= 2004 Massachusetts Democratic presidential primary =

- March 2, 2004

121 Democratic National Convention delegates (93 pledged, 28 unpledged) The number of pledged delegates received is determined by the popular vote
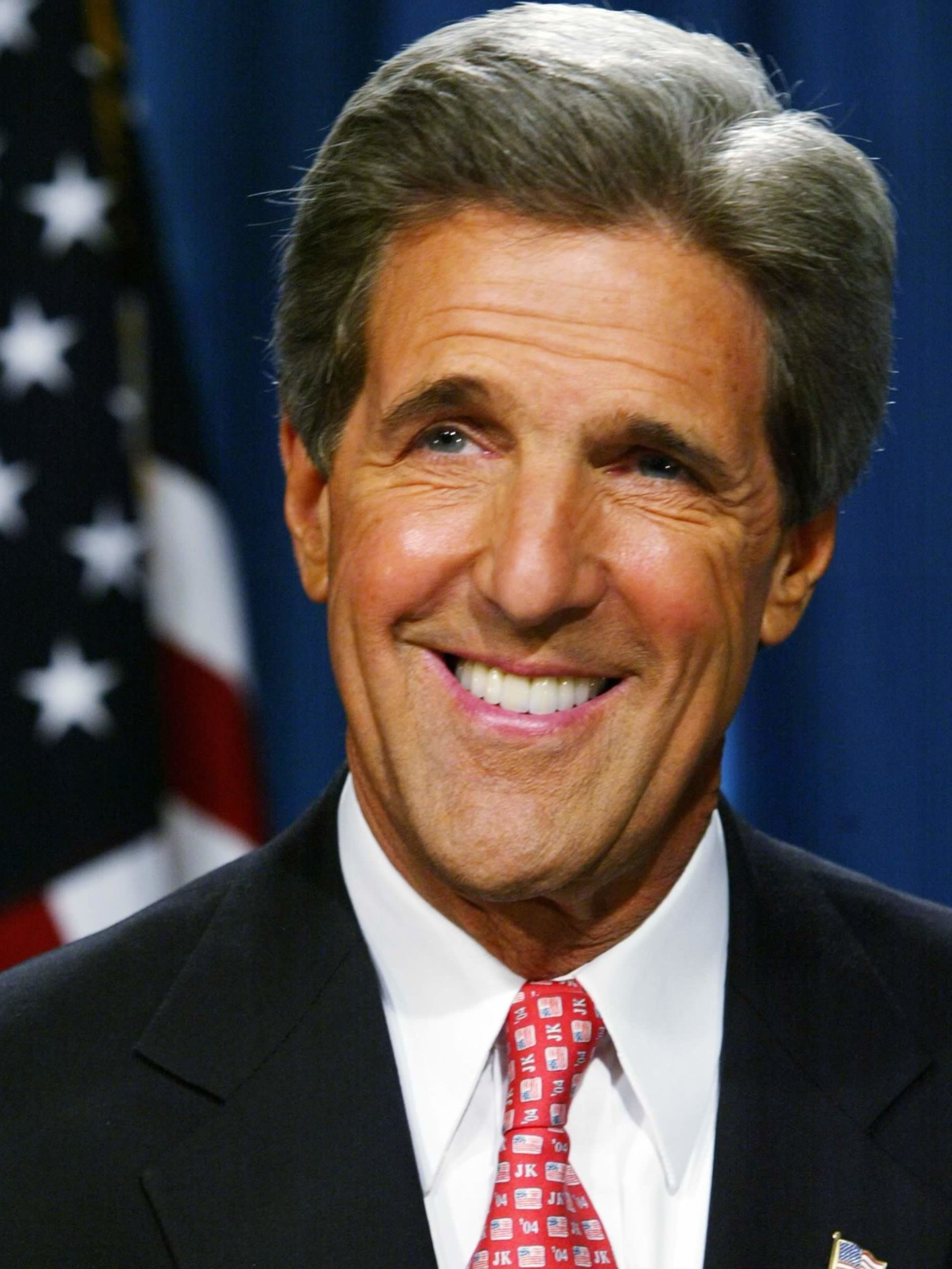

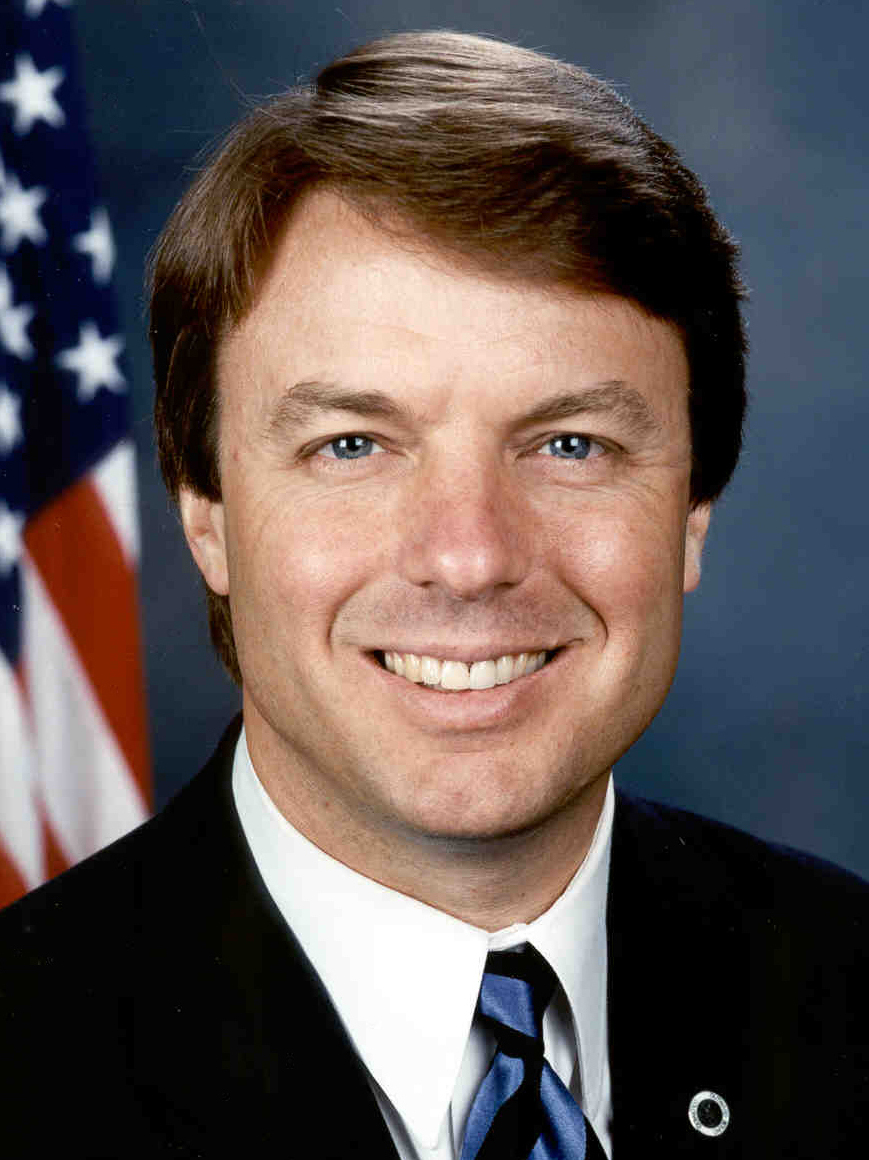
Candidate	John Kerry	John Edwards
Home state	Massachusetts	North Carolina
Delegate count	80	13
Popular vote	440,964	108,051
Percentage	71.68%	17.56%
- Kerry: 40–45% 45–50% 50–55% 55–60% 60–65% 65–70% 70–75% 75–80% 80–85% Kucinich: 45–50%

The 2004 Massachusetts Democratic presidential primary was held on March 2 in the U.S. state of Massachusetts as one of the Democratic Party's statewide nomination contests ahead of the 2004 presidential election.

== Results ==
2004 Massachusetts Democratic primary
Candidate	Votes	%	Delegates
John Kerry	440,964	71.68	80
John Edwards	108,051	17.56	13
Dennis Kucinich	25,198	4.10	0
Howard Dean (withdrawn)	17,076	2.78	0
Al Sharpton	6,123	1.00	0
Joe Lieberman (withdrawn)	5,432	0.88	0
Uncommitted	4,451	0.72	0
Wesley Clark (withdrawn)	3,109	0.51	0
Dick Gephardt (withdrawn)	1,455	0.24	0
Write-ins	1,340	0.22	0
Carol Moseley Braun (withdrawn)	1,019	0.17	0
Lyndon LaRouche	970	0.16	0
Total	615,188	100%	93
