= Robert E. Mann =

American politician

Member of the Illinois House of Representatives
- Succeeded by: Carol Moseley Braun

Personal details
- Born: Chicago, Illinois
- Party: Democratic

Robert E. Mann (March 17, 1929 - March 28, 2008) was a Democratic member of the Illinois House of Representatives, serving from 1963 until his retirement in 1977. Representing Chicago's Hyde Park district, he was known for his independent stance and progressive values.

== Early life and education ==
Born in Chicago, Mann earned degrees in both law and business from the University of Chicago. In 1953, he met his future wife, Sylvia Romagnoli, while she was a nursing student at Michael Reese Hospital and he was studying law. They married in 1957 and celebrated their 50th wedding anniversary in 2007. He was Jewish.

== Political career ==
In 1962, Mann was selected by Chicago's 5th Ward Democratic organization as a candidate for the Illinois House. However, he soon distanced himself from the political machine, running as an independent Democrat in subsequent elections. During his 16-year tenure, Mann was part of a group of reform-minded legislators—including Abner Mikva, Paul Simon, and Anthony Scariano—known as the "Kosher Nostra," recognized for challenging party lines and advocating liberal causes.

Mann was a vocal advocate for civil liberties and social justice. He opposed the death penalty, supported increased welfare benefits, and championed gun control measures. He also worked to protect the Lake Michigan shoreline and introduced an anti-war bill during the Vietnam era, which, although unsuccessful, underscored his commitment to peace.
