= 1992 United States Senate election in Illinois =

- November 3, 1992
- Turnout: 74.84%
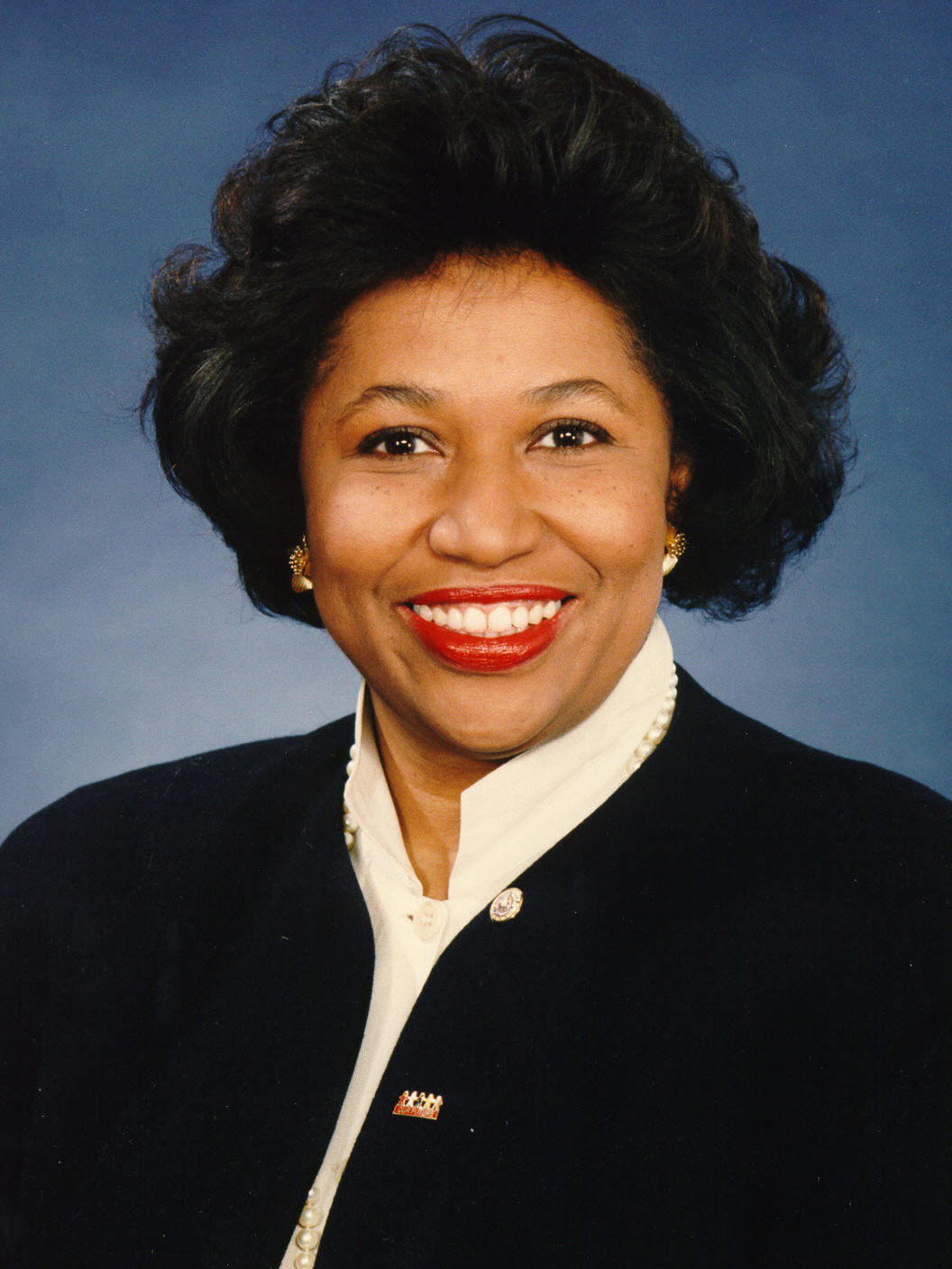

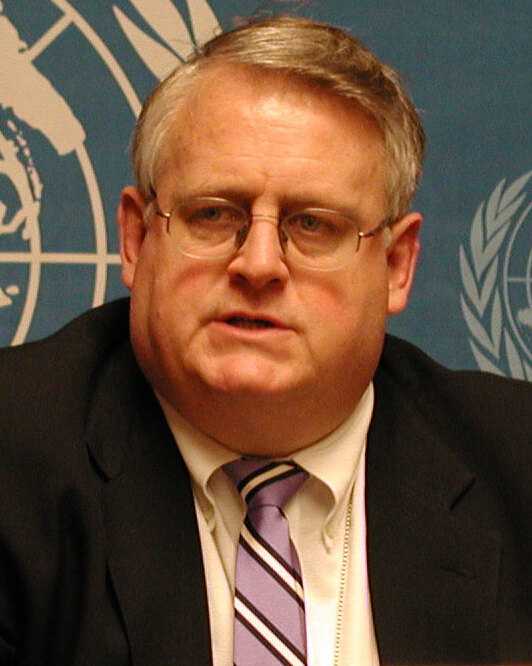
Nominee	Carol Moseley Braun	Richard S. Williamson
Party	Democratic	Republican
Popular vote	2,631,229	2,162,833
Percentage	53.27%	43.06%
- County results Braun: 40–50% 50–60% 60–70% Williamson: 40–50% 50–60%
U.S. senator before election
Alan J. Dixon
Democratic
Elected U.S. Senator
Carol Moseley Braun
Democratic

The 1992 United States Senate election in Illinois was held on November 3, 1992. Democratic incumbent Alan J. Dixon ran for re-election to a third term, but he was defeated in the Democratic primary by Carol Moseley Braun, who won the general election. Until 2022, this was the last time the same party won Illinois's Class 3 Senate seat in two or more consecutive elections.

Primary elections took place on March 17, 1992. Braun defeated Dixon and Albert Hofeld. As of 2026, Dixon is the last elected incumbent Democratic senator to lose renomination in a primary. (Note: In April 2009, after serving in the Senate as a Republican for 29 years, Senator Arlen Specter of Pennsylvania switched to the Democratic Party in anticipation of a difficult primary challenge in 2010. Specter ultimately lost to Joe Sestak in the Democratic primary on May 18.)

Braun made history by becoming the first African American senator who was a woman or member of the Democratic Party. Braun was also both the first African American and the first woman elected senator from the state of Illinois.

== Background ==
The primaries and general elections coincided with those for other federal elections (president and House), as well as those for state offices.

For the primaries, turnout was 35.20%, with 2,064,347 votes cast. For the general election, turnout was 74.84%, with 4,939,557 votes cast.

== Democratic primary ==
=== Candidates ===
- Carol Moseley Braun, Cook County recorder of deeds and former state representative
- Alan J. Dixon, incumbent U.S. senator since 1981
- Albert Hofeld, attorney

=== Results ===
Democratic Primary, United States Senate, 1992
Party	Candidate	Votes	%
Democratic	Carol Moseley Braun	557,694	38.3%
Democratic	Alan J. Dixon (incumbent)	504,077	34.6%
Democratic	Albert Hofeld	394,497	27.1%
Total votes		1,456,268	100.0%

Democratic primary results by county Moseley Braun: 30–40%; 40–50%; Dixon: 30–40%; 40–50%; 50–60%; 60–70%; 70–80%; Hofeld: 30–40%; 40–50%

=== Analysis ===
This defeat shocked observers; at the time no senator had been defeated in a primary in over a decade and Dixon had a long record of electoral success. He was a moderate Democrat who recently voted to confirm Clarence Thomas to the Supreme Court. Braun, a black woman and known reformist liberal, got a large share of black, liberal, and women voters ("The Year of the Woman").

In addition, she carried Cook County, Illinois, by far the most populated county in the state. Another factor was the third candidate in the race, multi-millionaire attorney Al Hofeld. Hofeld drew away some of the moderate and conservative Democrats who normally supported Dixon. He also spent a lot of money running advertisements attacking Dixon, weakening his support.

== Republican primary ==
Richard S. Williamson ran unopposed in the Republican primary.

Republican Primary, United States Senate, 1992
Party	Candidate	Votes	%
Republican	Richard S. Williamson	608,079	100.00%
Total votes		608,079	100.00%

== General election ==
=== Candidates ===
- Carol Moseley Braun, Cook County recorder of deeds and former state representative (Democratic)
- John Justice (Populist)
- Kathleen Kaku (Socialist Workers)
- Chad Koppie, farmer, former Rutland Township trustee, and retired commercial airline pilot (Independent)
- Alan J. Port (New Alliance)
- Andrew B. Spiegel (Libertarian)
- Richard S. Williamson, former assistant U.S. secretary of state for international organization affairs (Republican)
- Charles A. Winter (Natural Law)

=== Results ===
Moseley Braun won the 1992 Illinois Senate Race by a fairly comfortable margin. Moseley Braun did well as expected in Cook County home of Chicago. Williamson did well in the Chicago collar counties, and most northern parts of the state. Moseley Braun had a surprisingly strong showing in southern Illinois, which Republicans had come to dominate in the last several decades. Braun also did well in Rock Island County.

1992 Illinois U.S. Senate Election
Party	Candidate	Votes	%	±%
Democratic	Carol Moseley Braun	2,631,229	53.27	
Republican	Richard S. Williamson	2,126,833	43.06	
Independent	Chad Koppie	100,422	2.03	
Libertarian	Andrew B. Spiegel	34,527	0.70	
Natural Law	Charles A. Winter	15,118	0.31	
New Alliance	Alan J. Port	12,689	0.26	
Socialist Workers	Kathleen Kaku	10,056	0.20	
Populist	John Justice	8,656	0.16	
Write-in	Don A. Togersen	25	0.00	
Write-in	Walter A. Feiss	1	0.00	
Write-in	Roe Conn	1	0.00	
Turnout		4,939,557	74.84	
Democratic hold		Swing		

== See also ==
- 1992 United States Senate elections
