= Richard S. Williamson =

American diplomat

Rich Williamson
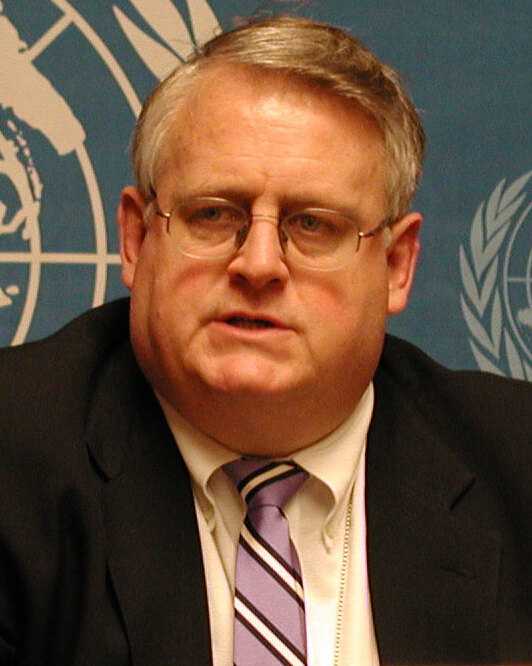

Chair of the Illinois Republican Party
- In office 1999–2001
- Preceded by: Harold Smith
- Succeeded by: Lee A. Daniels

17th Assistant Secretary of State for International Organization Affairs
- In office February 18, 1988 – March 19, 1989
- President: Ronald Reagan; George H. W. Bush
- Preceded by: Alan Keyes
- Succeeded by: John Bolton

United States Ambassador to the United Nations International Organizations in Vienna
- In office May 17, 1983 – January 15, 1985
- President: Ronald Reagan
- Preceded by: Position established
- Succeeded by: Bruce Chapman

Director of the White House Office of Intergovernmental Affairs
- In office January 20, 1981 – May 17, 1983
- President: Ronald Reagan
- Preceded by: Gene Eidenberg
- Succeeded by: Lee Verstandig

Personal details
- Born: Richard Salisbury Williamson; May 9, 1949 Evanston, Illinois, U.S.
- Died: December 8, 2013 (aged 64) Evanston, Illinois, U.S.
- Party: Republican
- Spouse: Jane Williamson
- Education: Princeton University (BA); University of Virginia (JD)

Richard Salisbury Williamson (May 9, 1949 – December 8, 2013) was an American lawyer, diplomat and political advisor. He previously served as Special Envoy to Sudan under George W. Bush. Williamson was a partner at Winston & Strawn and was also Thomas J. Sharkey Distinguished Visiting Scholar at Seton Hall's Whitehead School of Diplomacy.

== Early life ==
Williamson was born in Evanston, Illinois. He received an A.B., cum laude, in 1971 from Princeton University. He received a J.D. in 1974 from the University of Virginia School of Law, where he was executive editor of the Virginia Journal of International Law.

== Career ==
Williamson was a practicing partner in the law office of Winston and Strawn. Earlier in the George W. Bush administration, Williamson, who has broad foreign policy and negotiating experience, served as Ambassador to the United Nations for Special Political Affairs and in 2004 as United States Ambassador to the United Nations Commission on Human Rights. Williamson played a role in the slow resolution of the conflict in the Darfur region of Sudan.

Previously, he served in senior foreign policy positions under Presidents Ronald Reagan and George H. W. Bush, including as Assistant Secretary of State for International Organization Affairs at the Department of State, and an Assistant to the President for Intergovernmental Affairs in the White House. In 1992, he was nominated by the Republican Party for United States Senate, but lost to Democrat Carol Moseley-Braun, the first black woman to be elected to the U.S. Senate. In 1999, he was selected to serve as the Chairman of the Illinois Republican Party.

Williamson was active in a wide variety of civic organizations, serving on the board of directors of the International Republican Institute; the board of the Committee in Support of Russian Civil Society; a member of the advisory committee for the International Human Rights Center at DePaul University, and a member of the Council on Foreign Relations. Williamson also was the Roberta Buffett Visiting professor of International Studies at Northwestern University in Evanston, Illinois.

Williamson authored seven books and edited three. He wrote more than 175 articles in professional and popular periodicals.

== Death ==
Williamson died of a cerebral hemorrhage at a Chicago hospital in 2013, aged 64.

Political offices
Preceded by Gene Eidenberg	Director of the White House Office of Intergovernmental Affairs; 1981–1983	Succeeded by Lee Verstandig
Preceded by Alan Keyes	Assistant Secretary of State for International Organization Affairs; 1988–1989	Succeeded by John Bolton
Diplomatic posts
New office	United States Ambassador to the United Nations International Organizations in Vienna; 1983–1985	Succeeded by Bruce Chapman
Party political offices
Preceded by Judy Koehler	Republican nominee for U.S. Senator from Illinois (Class 3); 1992	Succeeded by Peter Fitzgerald
Preceded by Harold Smith	Chair of the Illinois Republican Party; 1999–2001	Succeeded by Lee A. Daniels
