= Suburban Bancorp =

Former US bank corporation

Suburban Bancorp, Inc. was a publicly traded multibank holding company headquartered in suburban Chicago. It was founded by Gerald F. Fitzgerald, father of former U.S. Senator Peter Fitzgerald, and majority owned by the Fitzgerald family. Bank of Montreal acquired Suburban Bancorp, Inc. by merger in 1994. Harris Bankmont, Inc., an American subsidiary of Bank of Montreal, merged with Suburban Bankcorp to expand the Harris Bank presence in the Chicago area. The all-stock deal was valued at $246 million.

== History ==
Gerald F. Fitzgerald started the network of banks that became Suburban Bancorp in 1961 when he acquired two institutions in the Chicago suburbs, Lake Villa Trust and Savings Bank and the Palatine National Bank. He founded five Chicago area banks de novo and purchased many others, ultimately assembling 13 banks with 30 locations in Cook, Lake, McHenry, DuPage and Kane County, Illinois. Most carried the Suburban name and all carried a maple leaf logo. At the time, Illinois did not allow branch banking and Fitzgerald was positioning his separately chartered banks for the eventual liberalization of branching restrictions.

In 1982, Illinois changed its laws to allow a single holding company to own multiple banks. This change enabled Fitzgerald to bring all of his family-controlled banks under the umbrella of Suburban Bancorp, Inc., one of Illinois's first multibank holding companies. Suburban Bancorp, Inc. went public in 1986 and listed its shares on the NASDAQ under the ticker symbol SUBBA.

Suburban Bancorp., Inc. banks advertised their safety and soundness and were renowned for their prudential approach to banking, reflecting Fitzgerald's belief that a bank should maintain superior liquidity at all times.

== Legacy ==
All four of Gerald F. Fitzgerald's sons went on to own and manage other banks, including former U.S. Senator Peter Fitzgerald, who founded Chain Bridge Bank, N.A. in 2007.
