= Gerald F. Fitzgerald =

American banking magnate

Gerald Francis Fitzgerald (July 6, 1925 – October 30, 2010) was an American banker and father of former U.S. Senator Peter Fitzgerald. Gerald Fitzgerald was the founder and chairman of Suburban Bancorp, Inc., a publicly traded multibank holding company with 13 banks and 30 locations when Bank of Montreal acquired it by merger in 1994. He brought the first ATM to Illinois in 1968 and established one of the first multibank holding companies in Illinois in 1982.

== Early life and education ==
Fitzgerald was born on July 6, 1925, in Chicago and raised in Oak Park, Illinois. After graduating from Fenwick High School, he served overseas in the U.S. Army during World War II. He was a combat engineer with the 1271st Engineer Combat Battalion and participated in the Ardennes-Alsace and Rhineland Campaigns. Following the war he received a B.S. in commerce from Northwestern University in 1949.

After graduating from Northwestern, Fitzgerald worked briefly for his family’s business, Premier Printing Company. He then started his own public relations firm in Chicago, Fitzgerald & Cooke, which later became part of Hill & Knowlton.

== Banking career ==
In 1957, Fitzgerald was elected to the board of directors of the First National Bank of LaGrange in LaGrange, Illinois stemming from his family’s holdings in the Oberwortmann Banks. His experience serving on that board piqued his interest in banking. In 1961, Fitzgerald acquired two banks in the Chicago suburbs, Lake Villa Trust and Savings Bank and the Palatine National Bank. Over the next three decades, when Illinois was still a unit banking state, he founded five suburban Chicago banks de novo and led the acquisition of many others, ultimately creating a network of 13 banks with 30 locations in Cook, Lake, McHenry, DuPage and Kane County, Illinois.

When Illinois law changed in 1982 to allow a single holding company to own multiple banks, Fitzgerald brought all of his banks under the umbrella of Suburban Bancorp, Inc., one of Illinois’s first multibank holding companies. In 1986, Fitzgerald led the initial public offering of Suburban Bancorp, Inc. It was listed on the NASDAQ. In addition to being a leader in branch-style banking and technology such as the ATM, Fitzgerald was known in the industry for his prudent approach to lending and his financial management practices. “He was known in financial circles as an expert on bank planning, automation and profitability,” according to one Chicago area banking consultant. In 1994, Bank of Montreal acquired by merger Fitzgerald’s Suburban Bancorp, Inc. in all-stock transaction worth $246 million.

== Banking philosophy ==
Fitzgerald had a reputation as a conservative banker. He maintained that a bank should maintain superior liquidity at all times and never lend out more than 50 percent of its deposits. He also believed that borrowers who amortized their mortgages as quickly as possible had better financial character than those who sought long amortizations or the lowest possible monthly payments. His banks would only extend mortgages that amortized in 15 years or less and would not make any loans with an amortization period longer than 20 years. “He wanted people who were bothered by debt and would pay it down as fast as possible,” his son Peter Fitzgerald said.

After guiding his banks through six recessions during the second half of the 20th century, Fitzgerald in his later years “thought the banking industry had . . . become reckless and it was unrecognizable to him,” according to Peter Fitzgerald.

== Personal life ==
In 1949, Fitzgerald married Marjorie Gosselin Fitzgerald whom he met at Northwestern University. They were married for 61 years and had five children: Gerald F. Fitzgerald, Jr., James G. Fitzgerald, Thomas G. Fitzgerald, Julie Fitzgerald Schauer, and Peter G. Fitzgerald. His four sons followed him into banking. Peter Fitzgerald served as U.S. Senator from Illinois from 1999 to 2005. Senator Fitzgerald founded Chain Bridge Bank, N.A. in McLean, Virginia, in 2007.

Fitzgerald owned thoroughbred racehorses as well as a thoroughbred breeding farm and racing stable called Bank Note Farm. He named his horses after banking terms, such as One Over Prime and Disintermediation. He also collected rare books and maps, compiling an extensive collection of old masters paintings and portraits. In retirement he authored the privately published book, Africa by Air, about his 1973 circumnavigation of Africa.

Fitzgerald was a consultant to NATO in 1976 and served on the Illinois Racing Board from 1968 to 1971.

Fitzgerald's records, along with other materials related to his career, are currently housed at the Newberry Library in Chicago.

== Philanthropy ==
Fitzgerald was a benefactor to Hôpital Albert Schweitzer, a missionary hospital in Gabon, as well as Northwestern University, the Newberry Library, and the Little Sisters of the Poor.
