= Our American Revival =

- Company type: 527 organization
- Headquarters: Urbandale, Iowa, U.S.
- Area served: North America
- Website: www.ouramericanrevival.com

Our American Revival is a 527 organization that was set up in late January 2015 by Scott Walker. The organization has leased space at 2775 86th St. in Urbandale, Iowa, which is also known as the GOP's Des Moines Victory Office. Mitt Romney used the same location for his 2012 Iowa presidential campaign.

OAR coordinated and paid for Walker's extensive travel around the country, including a number of visits to Iowa and New Hampshire.

== Governance ==
- Rick Wiley, executive director.
- Kirsten Kukowski, communication director. Kukowski has been deputy communications director/press secretary for the Republican National Committee, and also worked on the 2008 McCain presidential campaign, Illinois Senate. Mark Kirk's election in 2010.
- Matt Mason, political director
- David Polyansky, senior Iowa adviser. President and CEO of Tarrance Group.
- Ed Goeas, senior advisor.
- Brian Tringali, will oversee polling and is a partner at Tarrance Group
- B.J. Martino will oversee polling and is Senior VP of Tarrance Group
- Mark Stephenson, chief data officer. Stephenson worked on Joni Ernst's Iowa Senate campaign, among others

Tringali and Martino have worked for Walker in his previous gubernatorial campaigns.

Several members of the Tarrance Group will conduct polling and provide strategic political advice to Walker.

== See also ==
- 501(c)(4) organizations
- 527 group
- Campaign finance in the United States
- Issue advocacy ads
