= Chain Bridge Bank =

Bank in the United States

Coordinates: 38.9323°N 77.1778°W

Chain Bridge Bank, N.A.
- Industry: Banking
- Founded: 2007
- Founder: Peter Fitzgerald
- Headquarters: McLean, Virginia
- Website: www.chainbridgebank.com

Chain Bridge Bank, National Association (N.A.) is a United States nationally chartered bank headquartered in McLean, Virginia, established in 2007 by former Illinois Senator Peter Fitzgerald.

== History ==
Chain Bridge was founded in 2007 by Peter Fitzgerald, two years after he left his Senate seat. The bank was started with $18.2 million, half of which came from the Fitzgerald family's wealth. Fitzgerald's father, Gerald F. Fitzgerald, previously chaired Chicago's Suburban Bancorp, which was sold to Bank of Montreal in 1994 for $246 million. The extended Fitzgerald family has a history in banking, having owned, co-owned, or managed approximately 57 community banks since the 1940s.

Shortly after opening, Chain Bridge Bank decided to focus on offering service online. The bank only has one physical branch, in McLean, Virginia.

Chain Bridge found success during the 2008 financial crisis. John McCain's presidential campaign sought a new bank for its funds due to other banks being unable to borrow enough money to continue their normal operations. The campaign moved its funds to Chain Bridge because of its ability at the time to provide short-term liquidity to meet the campaign's needs. The funds from the McCain campaign doubled the deposits in Chain Bridge.

The bank operates as a subsidiary of Chain Bridge Bancorp, Inc., a Delaware-chartered bank holding company. On October 7, 2024, the Company completed its initial public offering (“IPO”) by issuing 1.85 million shares of Class A common stock at a public offering price of $22 per share. The Company raised approximately $40.7 million in gross proceeds from its IPO. Shares trade on the New York Stock Exchange under the ticker symbol “CBNA."

== Political connections ==
Despite being a small bank with a single physical branch, Chain Bridge was responsible for handling more campaign funding for the 2016 United States presidential election than any other bank in the country. Chain Bridge was the sole bank serving the Jeb Bush campaign and its super-PAC, Right to Rise. The Trump campaign also used the bank, and it was listed as the primary bank for the Rand Paul and Rick Perry campaigns.

In the 2008 election, the bank also served the campaign of John McCain, and of Mitt Romney in 2012. Bradley Crate, the chief financial officer of the 2012 Romney campaign, claimed that the reason the bank was favored by political candidates and organizations was the lack of "bureaucracy" compared to larger banks; Chain Bridge would approve campaign staffers' credit cards immediately without credit checks, and allow campaigns to wire large sums of money immediately after opening accounts.

== Investigations ==
The Hawaii GOP told the FEC in February 2021 that it had a previously undisclosed bank account associated with the Trump Victory Committee at Chain Bridge. They declined to speak about why the account was created or how it was used.

One Chain Bridge client, the Trump Victory Committee, was being investigated for campaign finance reporting discrepancies as of April 2021. The Trump Victory Committee made disbursements to state GOP committees, who in turn passed identical disbursements on to the RNC. This may have been an attempt to evade regulations limiting contributions that the RNC can receive.
