= Carol Moseley Braun =

American politician and lawyer (born 1947)

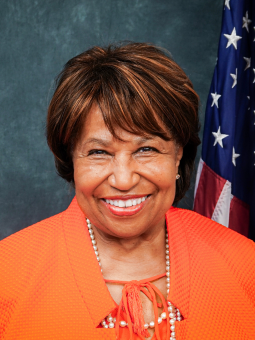
- Official portrait, 2024

Chair of the United States African Development Foundation
- Incumbent
- Assumed office April 2024
- President: Joe Biden; Donald Trump
- Preceded by: Jack Leslie

United States Ambassador to New Zealand
- In office December 15, 1999 – March 1, 2001
- President: Bill Clinton; George W. Bush
- Preceded by: Joe Beeman
- Succeeded by: Charles Swindells

United States Ambassador to Samoa
- In office February 8, 2000 – March 1, 2001
- President: Bill Clinton; George W. Bush
- Preceded by: Joe Beeman
- Succeeded by: Charles Swindells

United States Senator from Illinois
- In office January 3, 1993 – January 3, 1999
- Preceded by: Alan Dixon
- Succeeded by: Peter Fitzgerald

Cook County Recorder of Deeds
- In office December 1, 1988 – December 1, 1992
- Preceded by: Harry Yourell
- Succeeded by: Jesse White

Member of the Illinois House of Representatives
- In office January 5, 1979 – December 1, 1988
- Preceded by: Robert E. Mann
- Succeeded by: Donne Trotter
- Constituency: 24th district (1979–1983); 25th district (1983–1988)

Personal details
- Born: Carol Elizabeth Moseley; August 16, 1947 (age 79) Chicago, Illinois, U.S.
- Party: Democratic
- Spouse: Michael Braun (m. 1973; div. 1986)
- Children: 1
- Education: University of Illinois, Urbana-Champaign (attended); University of Illinois, Chicago (BA); University of Chicago (JD)

Carol Elizabeth Moseley Braun, also sometimes Moseley-Braun (born August 16, 1947), is an American diplomat, politician, and lawyer who represented Illinois in the United States Senate from 1993 to 1999. Moseley Braun was the first African-American woman elected to the U.S. Senate, the first African-American U.S. senator from the Democratic Party and the first female U.S. senator from Illinois.

Moseley Braun was a member of the Illinois House of Representatives from 1979 to 1988 and served as Cook County Recorder of Deeds from 1988 to 1992. She was elected to the U.S. Senate in 1992 after defeating Senator Alan J. Dixon in a Democratic primary. Moseley Braun served one term in the Senate and was defeated by Republican Peter Fitzgerald in 1998.

Following her Senate tenure, Moseley Braun served as the United States Ambassador to New Zealand and Samoa from 1999 to 2001. She was a candidate for the Democratic nomination in the 2004 U.S. presidential election; she withdrew from the race prior to the Iowa caucuses. In November 2010, Moseley Braun began a campaign for mayor of Chicago to replace retiring incumbent Richard M. Daley. She placed fourth in a field of six candidates, losing the 2011 election to Rahm Emanuel. In January 2023, she was nominated by President Joe Biden to serve as a member and chair of the board of directors for the United States African Development Foundation, and began her tenure in April 2024.

== Early life, education, family, and early career ==
Carol Elizabeth Moseley was born in Chicago. She attended public and parochial schools. She attended Ruggles School for elementary school, and she attended Parker High School (now the site of Paul Robeson High School) in Chicago. Her father, Joseph J. Moseley, was a Chicago police officer and jail guard and her mother, Edna A. (Davie), was a medical technician in a hospital. Both her parents were Catholic, and Moseley was raised in the faith.

The family lived in a segregated middle-class neighborhood on the South Side of Chicago. Her parents divorced when she was in her teens, and she lived with her grandmother.

Moseley began her undergraduate studies at the University of Illinois at Urbana–Champaign, but dropped out after four months. She then majored in political science at the University of Illinois at Chicago, graduating in 1969. Moseley earned a J.D. degree from the University of Chicago Law School in 1972.

In 1973, Moseley married Michael Braun, whom she had met in law school. The couple had one son, Matthew, in 1977. Their marriage ended in divorce in 1986.

Moseley Braun worked as a prosecutor in the United States Attorney's office in Chicago from 1973 to 1977. As an Assistant United States Attorney, she worked primarily in the civil and appellate law areas. Her work in housing, health policy, and environmental law won her the Attorney General's Special Achievement Award. She stopped working as a prosecutor after her son's birth, and briefly became a homemaker before being persuaded to run for the Illinois state legislature.

== Early political career ==
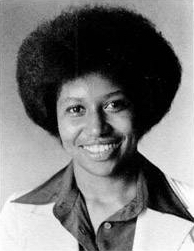
official photograph, circa 1979

Moseley Braun was first elected to public office in 1978, when she was elected to the Illinois House of Representatives. She became the first African American woman to serve as assistant majority leader in that body. As a state representative, she became recognized as a champion for liberal social causes. As early as 1984, she proposed a moratorium on the application of the death penalty in Illinois. In what became a landmark reapportionment case, Crosby v. State Board of Elections, she successfully sued her own party and the state of Illinois on behalf of African-American and Hispanic citizens. When she left the state legislature, her colleagues recognized her in a resolution as "the conscience of the House." In 1988, she was elected Cook County Recorder of Deeds, a post she held for four years.

== U.S. Senator from Illinois ==
=== Elections ===
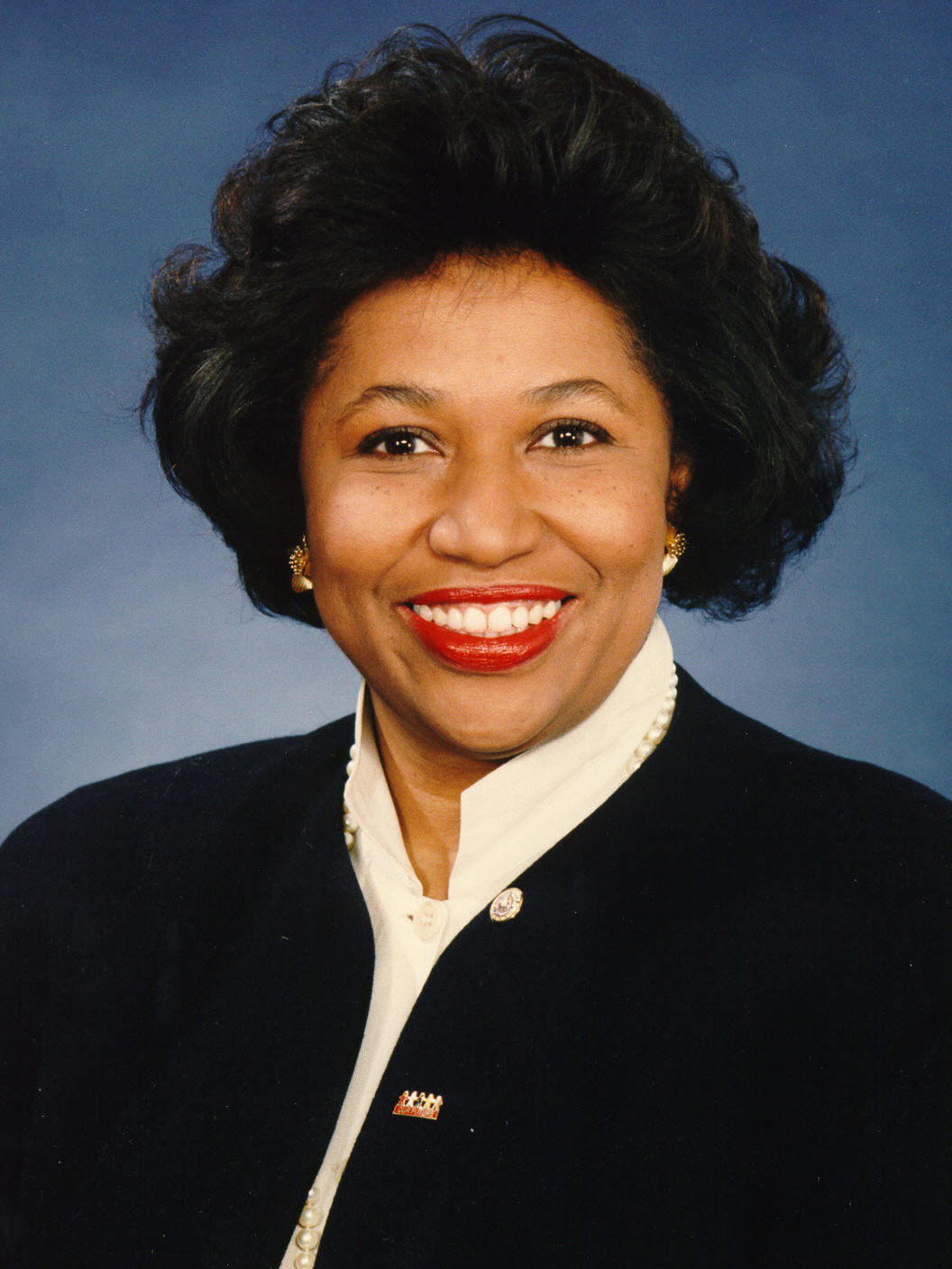
Moseley Braun in 1993

In 1992, angered by incumbent Democratic senator Alan Dixon's vote to confirm Clarence Thomas despite accusations of sexual harassment from Anita Hill, Moseley Braun challenged Dixon in the primary election for his seat. She was backed by the political coalition from the Hyde Park neighborhood of Chicago that had previously backed the campaigns of Harold Washington and Jesse Jackson. Democratic candidate Albert Hofeld's campaign ran many anti-Dixon ads, and Moseley Braun won the Democratic primary. On November 3, 1992, Moseley Braun became the first African American woman to be elected to the United States Senate, defeating Republican Richard S. Williamson. Moseley Braun was also the first woman elected to the U.S. Senate from Illinois and the first African American elected to the U.S. Senate as a Democrat.

Moseley Braun was a one-term senator, losing to Republican Peter Fitzgerald in her re-election bid in 1998.

=== Tenure ===
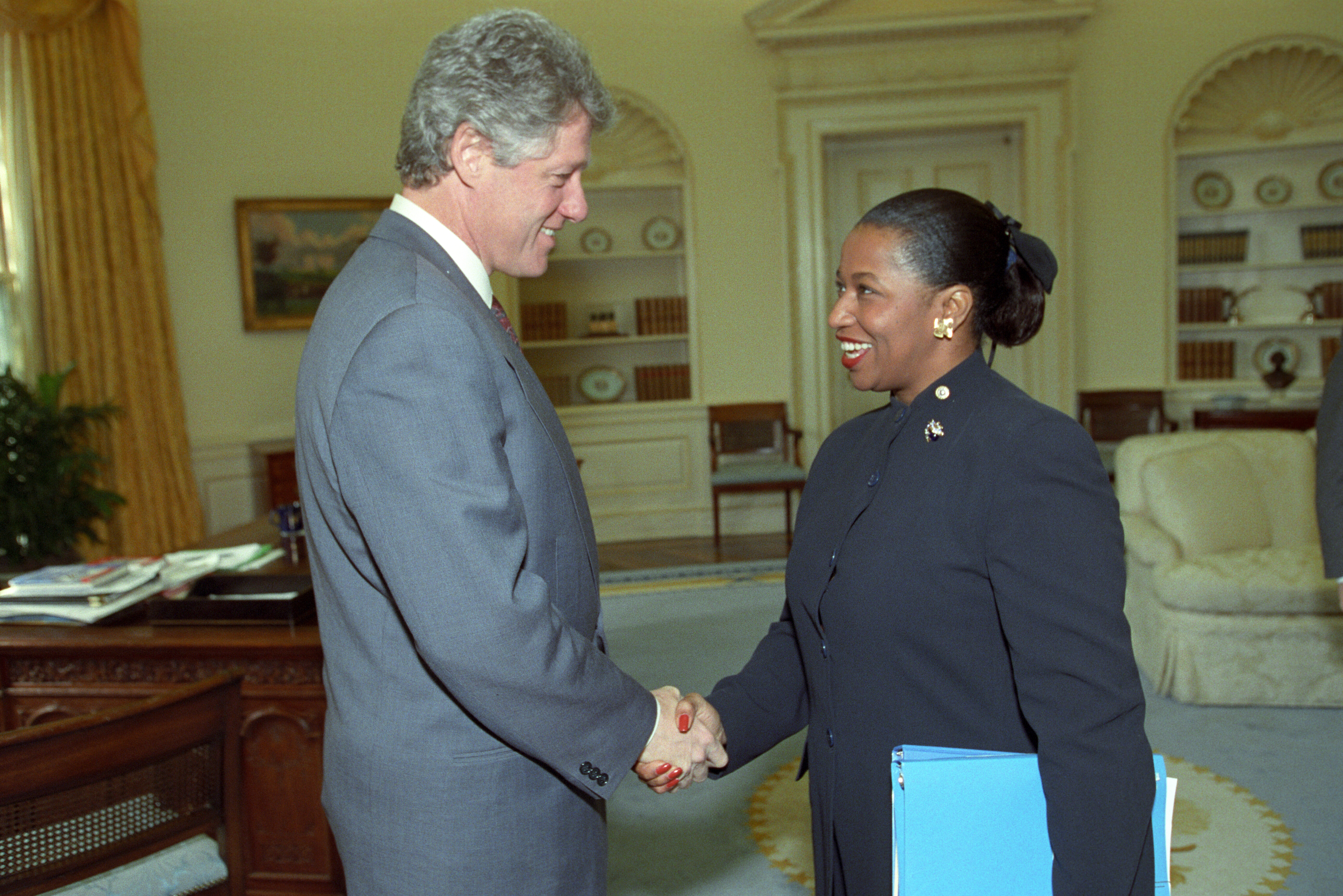
Moseley Braun greeting President Bill Clinton in March 1993

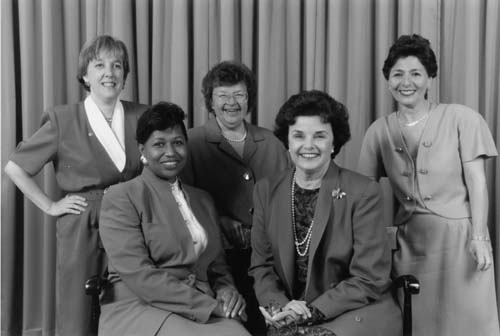
Female Senators of the Democratic Party, 1993. Top row (L-R): Sen. Patty Murray (D-WA), Sen. Barbara Mikulski (D-MD), Sen. Barbara Boxer (D-CA) Bottom row: Sen. Carol Moseley Braun (D-IL), Sen. Dianne Feinstein (D-CA)

Moseley Braun is the first African American woman to serve in the U.S. Senate. Along with Republican Edward Brooke, she was one of two African Americans to serve in the Senate in the 20th century. Moseley Braun was the sole African American in the Senate during her tenure. She was also the first woman to serve on the Senate Finance Committee.

Despite her reputation as a liberal Democrat, Moseley Braun possessed something of a centrist record on economic issues. She voted for the 1993 budget package and against the welfare reform laws passed in 1996, but on many other matters she was more conservative. Moseley Braun voted in favor of the North American Free Trade Agreement (NAFTA) and lawsuit reform measures like the Private Securities Litigation Reform Act (she was also among the minority of Democrats to support the even more controversial Common Sense Product Liability and Legal Reform Act of 1995). She also voted contrary to the interests of the more populist wing of the party by voting for the Freedom to Farm Act and the Telecommunications Act of 1996. Like her Illinois colleague, fellow Democrat Paul Simon, she voted in favor of a Balanced Budget Amendment to the United States Constitution. Moseley Braun also voted to place a nuclear spent fuel storage facility in Nevada; this move was strongly opposed by many Democrats, especially future Majority Leader Harry Reid.

On social issues, however, Moseley Braun was significantly more liberal than many of her fellow senators. She was strongly pro-choice, voting against the ban on partial-birth abortions and the restrictions on funding in military bases for abortions. She also voted against the death penalty and in favor of gun control measures. Moseley Braun was one of only fourteen to vote against the Defense of Marriage Act. She delivered a eulogy for Thurgood Marshall in January 1993.

Moseley Braun was the subject of a 1993 Federal Election Commission investigation over $249,000 in unaccounted-for campaign funds. The agency found some small violations, but took no action against Moseley Braun, citing a lack of resources. Moseley Braun only admitted to bookkeeping errors. The Justice Department turned down two requests for investigations from the IRS.

Women were not allowed to wear pants on the U.S. Senate floor until 1993. In 1993, Senators Moseley Braun and Barbara Mikulski wore pants onto the floor in defiance of the rule. Soon after, female support staff followed their example. Later that year, the rule was amended by Senate Sergeant-at-Arms Martha Pope to allow women to wear pants on the floor so long as they also wore jackets.

In 1993, Moseley Braun made headlines when she convinced the Senate Judiciary Committee not to renew a design patent for the United Daughters of the Confederacy because it contained the Confederate flag. The patent had been routinely renewed for nearly a century, and despite the Judiciary Committee's disapproval, the Senate was poised to pass a resolution sponsored by Senator Jesse Helms of North Carolina that included a provision to authorize the extension of the federal patent. Moseley Braun threatened to filibuster the legislation "until this room freezes over." She also made a plea to her colleagues about the symbolism of the Confederate flag, declaring, "It has no place in our modern times, place in this body, place in our society". Swayed by Moseley Braun's argument, the Senate rejected the UDC's application to renew its patent.

In 1996, Moseley Braun made a private trip to Nigeria, where she met with dictator Sani Abacha. Despite U.S. sanctions against that country due to Abacha's actions, the Senator neither notified nor registered her trip with the State Department. She subsequently defended Abacha's human rights record in Congress. Her former fiancé Kgosie Matthews, who also served on her campaign staff in violation of U.S. immigration regulations, had been a lobbyist for the Nigerian government; Matthews would later leave the country. She paid Matthews, a native of South Africa, a salary of $15,000 a month during the campaign.

In 1998, after George Will wrote a column reviewing the allegations of corruption against her, Moseley Braun responded to Will's comments, saying that "I think because he couldn't say nigger, he said corrupt". She also compared Will to a Ku Klux Klansman, saying: "I mean this very sincerely from the bottom of my heart: He can take his hood and put it back on again, as far as I'm concerned". Later, Moseley Braun apologized for her remarks.

== U.S. Ambassador to New Zealand and Samoa ==
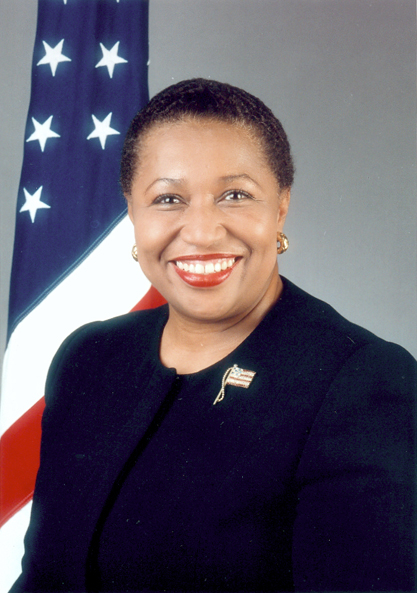
Ambassadorial portrait

On October 8, 1999, President Clinton nominated Moseley Braun to be the United States Ambassador to New Zealand and Samoa. Although her nomination ran into token opposition from her old adversary, Jesse Helms, and from the senator who defeated her, Peter Fitzgerald, the Senate confirmed her on November 10, 1999, in a 96–2 vote. She served in these roles until 2001.

== 2004 presidential campaign ==
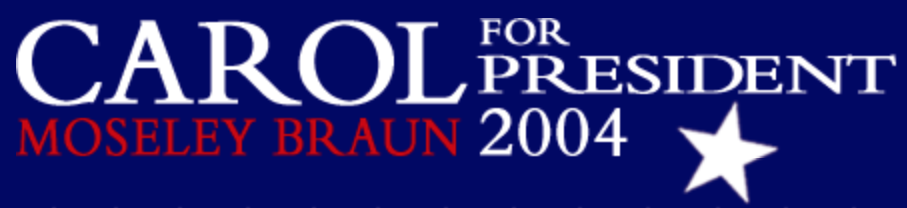
Moseley Braun campaign logo

=== Exploratory committee and campaign launch ===
Analysts had speculated that Moseley Braun was preparing for a potential run to reclaim her former Senate seat in the 2004 United States Senate election in Illinois. However, in January 2003, Braun decided against running for the U.S. Senate again. On February 18, 2003, she announced her intention to run for the Democratic Party presidential nomination, doing so in a speech delivered at the University of Chicago Law School. Braun thereafter launched an exploratory committee for a presidential campaign. She had, in the days leading up to this announcement, made her first campaign-season visits to the early primary and caucus states of New Hampshire, Iowa, and South Carolina. In her announcement speech she declared, "It's time to take the 'men only' sign off the White House door." She joined an already sizable field of candidates for the Democratic nomination.

When asked about her prospects of winning at the launch of her exploratory committee, Moseley Braun declared "I have every hope and every expectation that this will be a successful effort. I'm running for president. I'm not running just to be another pretty face." Many, however, regarded her campaign to be a long shot, with many also regarding it as more of a vanity campaign then a serious effort for the presidency. Some speculation even existed that she was running to siphon black voters away from Al Sharpton's candidacy. Other speculation existed that she was running in an effort to redeem her image after her scandals as a senator and 1998 reelection defeat.

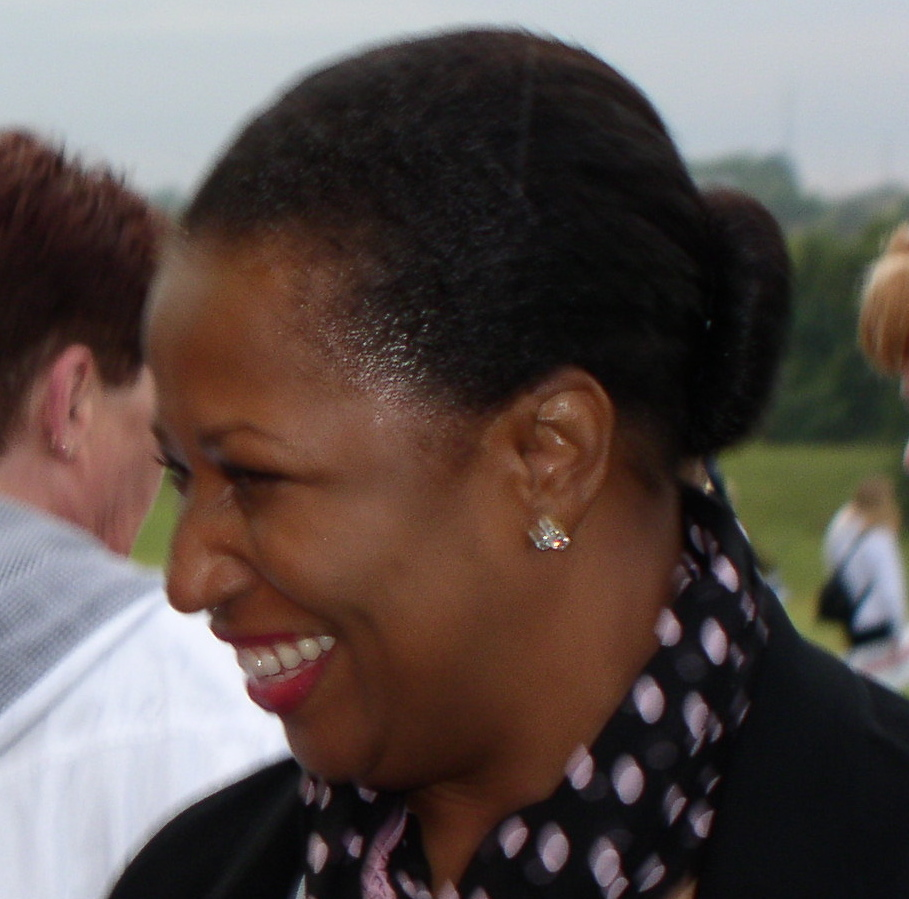
Moseley Braun campaigning in Iowa

After this exploratory phase, Braun formally launched her candidacy on September 23, 2003. Moseley Braun's campaign operation was initially based between two headquarters, one in Chicago and one in Washington, D.C. They were later consolidated to a single headquarters in Chicago.

=== Positions on issues ===
By July 2003, Moseley Braun had failed to release any detailed policy papers. Eric Slater of the Los Angeles Times wrote that, during the debates and forums, rather than focusing on policy, Moseley Braun largely partook in jockeying against candidates such as Sharpton and Howard Dean to appear like the candidate who stood in greatest contrast to incumbent Republican George W. Bush. Despite her lack of policy papers, Braun did voice her positions on a number of issues.

Moseley Braun made her support for a single-payer healthcare system a signature issue of her candidacy. Her proposal was for such a system to be paid for by direct income tax. She also proposed merging Medicare and Medicaid into a unified health program. When she launched her exploratory campaign, she positioned herself in opposition to a potential war with the country of Iraq, which would ultimately materialize months later as the Iraq War. After that war began, she would criticize president George W. Bush for how he proceeding in going to war with what she considers disregard for the United Nations, and would criticize the United States Congress for "abdicating its constitutional role" in allowing Bush to go to war. She also raised concerns about the rising national budget deficit. She described herself as a "budget hawk peace dove", and called for the national budget to be balanced. She ran in general opposition to the measures implemented by the Bush administration in the aftermath of 9/11, arguing that their policies were exploiting Americans' fear after the attacks to put in place "an extreme agenda, dangerous and divisive" and to take away civil liberties. She was particularly critical of United States attorney general John Ashcroft's expansion of law enforcement powers. She argued that the United States should combat terrorism by addressing underlying causes of it, such as by fostering "stability and opportunity" within failed states that might otherwise "provide fertile recruiting grounds for terrorists and extremists." She pledged to regain global goodwill for the United States and restore international cooperation that she argued had dissipated due to Bush's post-9/11 actions.

Moseley Braun also called for a reversal to childcare and education funding cuts, proposing funding the reinstatement of previous funding by eliminating the Bush tax cuts, simplifying the tax process, and eliminating any corporate loopholes that incentivize the offshoring of corporate operations. She opposed school voucher programs, asserting her belief that they deprived public schools of resources. She argued that state and federal funding for public schools needed to be increased to decrease the burden carried by local taxes, arguing that there was a "disproportionate burden property tax payers carry to fund America's public schools."

Moseley Braun argued that the United States should position itself as a leading force in achieving the environmental goals of the Kyoto Protocol, and should invest in environmental technologies with the goal of eliminating the United States' reliance on fossil fuels (including foreign oil). She also opposed extracting oil in protected areas, especially pointing to locations in Alaska. She also called for the United States to pressure international free trade organizations such as the World Trade Organization to make the protection of labor rights, human rights, and environmental standards prerequisites for countries to involve themselves in international trade.

Moseley Braun also opposed any privatization of Social Security, and voiced support for increasing the availability Individual Retirement Account (IRA) and pensions to low-income workers and women in order to remove inequity in retirement security.

=== Campaign operations ===
Moseley Braun's campaign strategy had placed an emphasis on hopes of performing well in the South Carolina primary. With that primary's traditionally sizable black electorate, it was seen to be a likely test of black enthusiasm for her candidacy. Moseley Braun was one of only two major black contenders for the Democratic nomination in 2004, with the other being Al Sharpton. Moseley Braun was also the only significant female candidate running in the 2004 Democratic Party presidential primaries. Moseley Braun's campaign would ultimately end up focusing their efforts on the African-American and female vote, which they regarded to be her base of support.

Moseley Braun's campaign struggled to raise funds. In the first three months of 2003, she raised only $72,450 for her candidacy, less than any other notable contenders in the Democratic primary. As a consequence, she had very few professional campaign staffers. Her campaign was instead largely run by a small number of volunteers. It took until July 1, 2003, for her campaign to hire a formal campaign manager. As the race developed, she continued to trail the other candidates in terms of fundraising. By July 2003, she had only raised $214,000, continuing to be lowest-performing of the nine major Democratic contenders in terms of fundraising. By November 2003, she had only raised $342,518. In total, her campaign would ultimately raise just under $600,000.

In mid-November 2003, Moseley Braun hired Patricia Ireland to serve as her campaign's new manager.

Moseley Braun never performed higher than single-digit numbers in polls for the primaries. Moseley Braun also failed to qualify for the ballot in a number of the scheduled state primaries and caucuses. On January 15, 2004, two days after a disappointing third place showing in the D.C. primary and four days before the Iowa caucuses, Moseley Braun dropped out of the race and endorsed Howard Dean's candidacy. Shortly before Moseley Braun withdrew, her own campaign manager, Patricia Ireland, had publicly conceded that she no longer believed Moseley Braun stood any chance of capturing the Democratic nomination. Upon her departure from the race, Ron Fournier of the Associated Press wrote that, "she leaves the race after having made no impact on it, except for some bright moments in the presidential debates".

== 2011 campaign for mayor of Chicago ==
Moseley Braun campaign logo

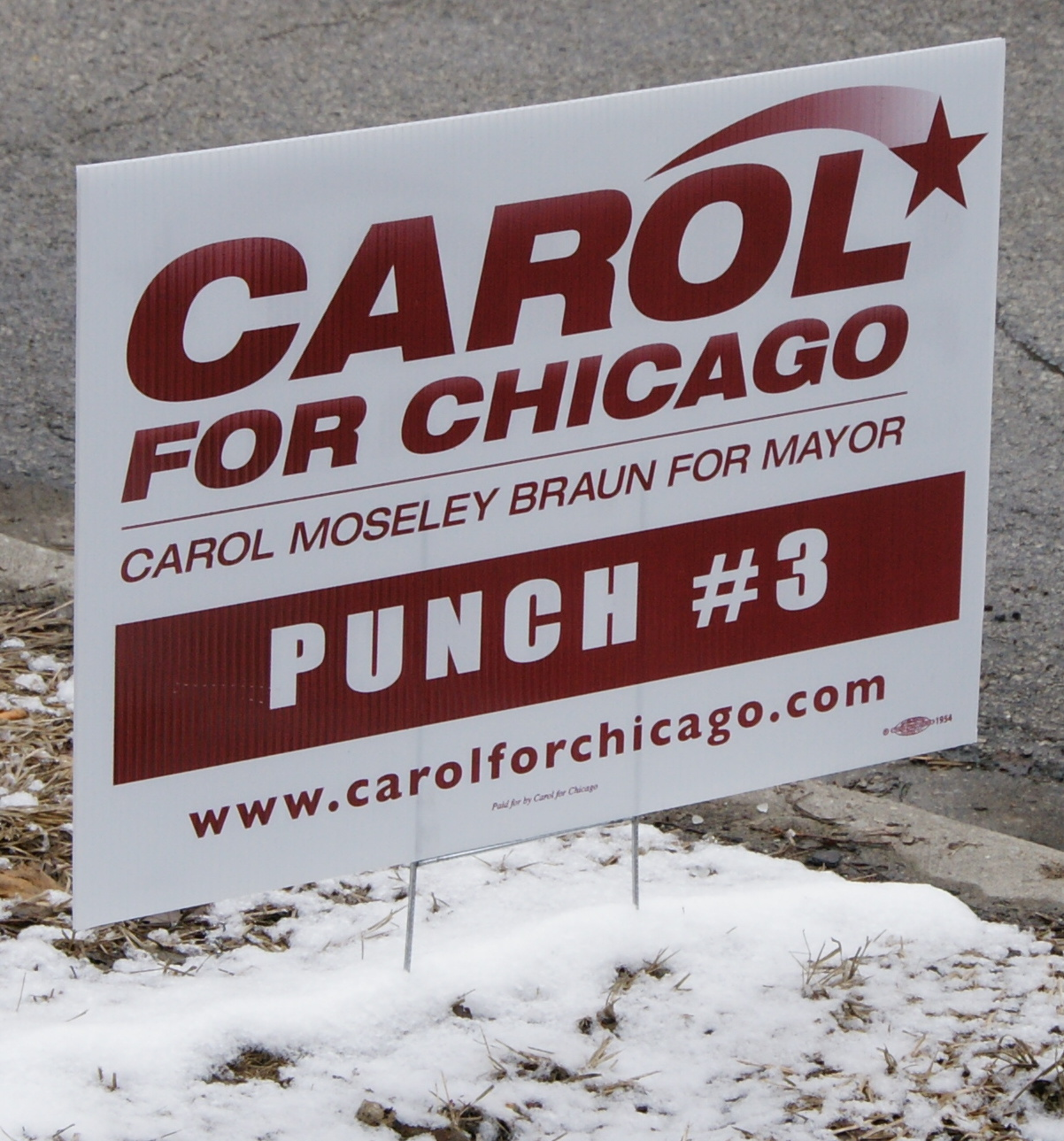
Sign for Moseley Braun's mayoral campaign

In November 2010, after Chicago mayor Richard M. Daley announced that he would not seek re-election, Moseley Braun announced she would run for mayor of Chicago in 2011. In early 2011, two potentially strong African-American candidates—U.S. Rep. Danny Davis and State Sen. James Meeks—left the race and endorsed Moseley Braun, making her the so-called consensus black candidate. This came after a discussions between Moseley Braun and the other two candidates where it was decided that Moseley Braun, with her profile as a former US Senator, ambassador, and presidential candidate, would be the strongest of the three candidates. These discussions had occurred with the involvement of Chicago African American figures such Jesse Jackson and Walter Burnett Jr.

Moseley Braun appeared likely to be a strong contender for the mayoralty. However, a series of scandals and blunders would result in her finishing fourth in the election.

Moseley Braun had several difficulties with her candidacy, including a lack of funding. She raised approximately $705,000, while Rahm Emanuel raised over $15 million. While referred to as the "consensus" African American candidate, she was not receiving much financial backing or from African American politicians and community leaders, many of whom instead backed Rahm Emanuel. Only a few of the city's African-American business leaders (including Elzie Higginbottom and John W. Rogers Jr.) contributed to her campaign. She also received $25,000 from congressman Bobby Rush. With a lack of funds, Moseley Braun only was able to air a single television ad, which she ran late in the campaign. African American politicians and community leaders also did not provide non-financial assistance to Moseley Brown's campaign effort. Moseley Braun's campaign also received no support from trade unions. Moseley Braun encountered criticism for accepting donations from individuals who had already donated the $5,000 maximum (which was instituted January 1, 2011 when the Illinois Campaign Disclosure Act went into effect).

Additionally, Moseley Braun suffered from a poorly run campaign. There was internal conflict within Moseley Braun's campaign organization. Her candidacy was also plagued by gaffes, including missed interviews and an inability to provide a sufficient explanation for her past financial problems. However, the most serious debacle came in a debate on January 30, 2011, when Moseley Braun accused another candidate, Patricia Van-Pelt Watkins, of "being strung out on crack" for 20 years. Van-Pelt Watkins had once been addicted to cocaine, but had been clean for 30 years. This attack on Van-Pelt Watkins backfired and was detrimental to Moseley Braun's own candidacy. Braun's campaign, which had never gained much traction, began to bleed what support it had after she made this attack, with many former supporters fleeing to support Emanuel instead.

As a candidate, Moseley Braun opposed moving the city to having an elected school board. Moseley Braun also criticized frontrunner Rahm Emanuel's tax proposals, arguing that they would fail to assist poorer Chicagoans. She also accused Emanuel of having numerous times voted against Congressional Black Caucus proposals that would have assisted lower-income families. As a candidate, Braun also placed an emphasis on her governmental experience and her ties to the city's black community.

On February 22, 2011, Moseley Braun came in fourth in the field of six, receiving about nine percent of the vote. In her concession speech, she remarked that her young niece could become the first female mayor of Chicago, despite the fact that Jane Byrne had already served as Chicago's first female mayor.

== Later political activities ==
In the 2016 Democratic U.S. Senate primary in Maryland, Moseley Braun endorsed Donna Edwards. In the 2019 Chicago mayoral election runoff, Moseley Braun endorsed Toni Preckwinkle. In the 2023 Chicago mayoral election runoff, Moseley Braun endorsed Brandon Johnson.

In the 2020 Democratic Party presidential primaries, Moseley Braun endorsed Joe Biden. During the November 2019 Democratic presidential debate, Biden mentioned her endorsement, misspeaking and mistakenly referring to her as "the only African-American woman who's ever been elected to the United States Senate", only to be quickly corrected by his opponents, including Kamala Harris, who herself happened to be the second (and, at the time, only other) African-American woman elected to the U.S. Senate. This gaffe of Biden's attracted significant media attention. Moseley Braun traveled to various states to campaign on Biden's behalf. At the 2020 Democratic National Convention, she was responsible for announcing Illinois' votes in the roll call. After Biden's victory in the general election (with Kamala Harris as his vice presidential running mate), Moseley Braun made it publicly known that she was interested in being his Secretary of the Interior. She also expressed interest in holding some other role in his administration. Biden opted to nominate Deb Haaland for Secretary of the Interior. Soon after Biden withdrew from the 2024 presidential election, Moseley Braun voiced her support for Vice President Harris' candidacy to be nominated for president at the 2024 Democratic National Convention.

== United States African Development Foundation ==
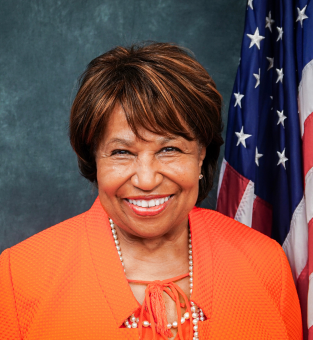
Official portrait, 2024

In January 2023, Biden nominated Moseley Braun to be member and chair of the board of directors of the United States African Development Foundation. In January 2024, Biden again put forth the nomination. The nomination to serve on the board was confirmed on March 8, 2024. Her term on the board will extend until September 22, 2029. She was sworn in as board member and chair in April 2024.

== Work outside government and politics ==
In 2005, Moseley Braun founded an organic products company known as Good Food Organics. Good Food Organics was the parent company of Ambassador Organics. As of 2019, the company was defunct.

Moseley Braun became a visiting professor of political science at Northwestern University in November 2016.

In April 2025, Moseley Braun was elected Board Chair of the DuSable Museum in Chicago.

Trailblazer: Perseverance in Life and Politics, a memoir authored by Moseley Braun, is scheduled to be published on January 21, 2026, by Hanover Square Press.

== Personal life ==
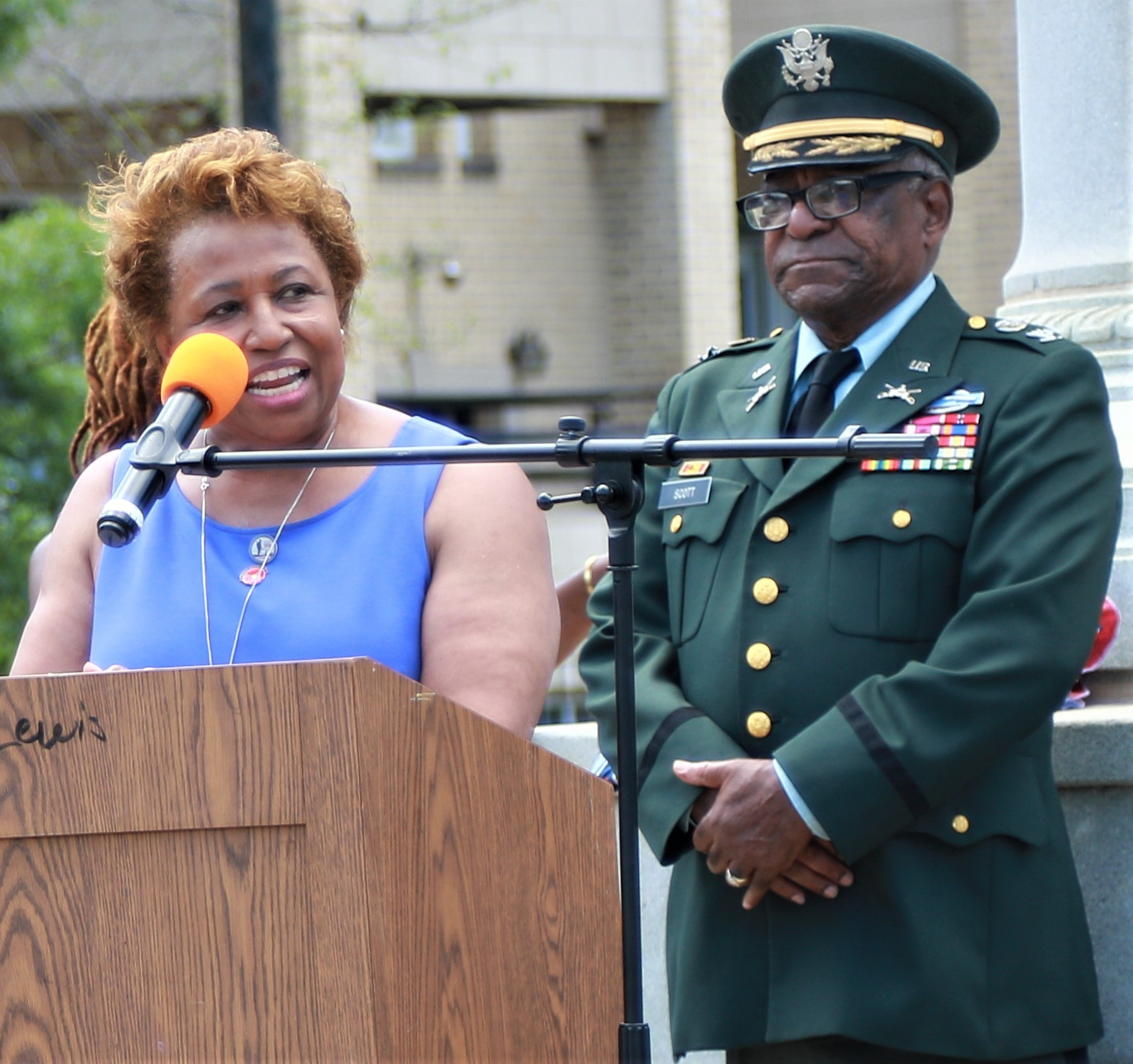
Moseley Braun speaking in Chicago in 2019

In September 1998, Lauryn Kaye Valentine applied for permission to change her name to Carol Moseley Braun. Valentine cited the former senator as her hero and promised not to "dishonor [the] name". The change was made official. That December, however, Valentine put her name forward as a candidate for alderman of Chicago's 37th Ward. Before the election, a Circuit Court judge rescinded the name change, forcing Valentine to revert to her original name. Valentine was later ruled ineligible to run, as she was not a registered voter at the time because of her name changes.

In April 2007, Braun suffered a broken wrist when a mugger emerged from bushes near her front door to steal her purse. Braun resisted and fell during the struggle, fracturing her left wrist. The mugger was chased off by a University of Chicago student while his girlfriend called 911. Braun was later treated at a hospital and released. A man was later charged with the crime and was sentenced to 20 years in prison on July 11, 2008.

Braun's financial problems made headlines in October 2012 when it was revealed that her home was in foreclosure and that she had not made any mortgage payments for over a year. Before she was evicted, she sold her house for approximately $200,000 less than the amount she still owed on her mortgage loan.

== Electoral history ==
1988 Cook County Recorder of Deeds

1988 Cook County Recorder of Deeds Democratic primary
Party	Candidate	Votes	%
Democratic	Carol Moseley Braun	424,480	78.05
Democratic	Sheila A. Jones	119,372	21.95
Total votes		543,852	100

1988 Cook County Recorder of Deeds election
Party	Candidate	Votes	%
Democratic	Carol Moseley Braun	1,020,805	54.32
Republican	Bernard L. Stone	795,540	42.33
Illinois Solidarity	Edward M. Wojkowski	62,968	3.35
Total votes		1,879,313	100

1992 United States Senate election in Illinois

1992 Illinois United States Senate Democratic primary
Party	Candidate	Votes	%
Democratic	Carol Moseley Braun	557,694	38.3%
Democratic	Alan J. Dixon (incumbent)	504,077	34.6%
Democratic	Albert Hofeld	394,497	27.1%
Total votes		1,456,268	100

1992 United States Senate election in Illinois
Party	Candidate	Votes	%	±%
Democratic	Carol Moseley Braun	2,631,229	53.27	
Republican	Richard Williamson	2,126,833	43.06	

1998 United States Senate election in Illinois

1998 Illinois United States Senate Democratic primary
Party	Candidate	Votes	%
Democratic	Carol Moseley Braun (incumbent)	666,419	100
Total votes		666,419	100

1998 United States Senate election in Illinois
Party	Candidate	Votes	%
Republican	Peter Fitzgerald	1,709,041	50.35
Democratic	Carol Moseley Braun (incumbent)	1,610,496	47.44
Reform	Don Torgersen	74,704	2.20
US Taxpayers	Raymond Stalker	280	0.01%
Total votes		3,394,521	100

2004 Democratic Party presidential primaries

District of Columbia 2004 – Democratic Presidential Primary
Party	Candidate	Votes	%	±%
Democratic	Howard Dean	18,132	42.65	
Democratic	Al Sharpton	14,639	34.43	
Democratic	Carol Moseley Braun	4,924	11.58	
Democratic	Dennis Kucinich	3,481	8.19	
Democratic	Others	1,340	3.15	

2011 Chicago mayoral election

2011 Chicago mayoral election
Party	Candidate	Votes	%
Nonpartisan	Rahm Emanuel	326,331	55.27
Nonpartisan	Gery J. Chico	141,228	23.92
Nonpartisan	Miguel del Valle	54,689	9.26
Nonpartisan	Carol Moseley Braun	53,062	8.99
Nonpartisan	Patricia Van Pelt Watkins	9,704	1.64
Nonpartisan	William Walls, III	5,343	0.90
Write-in	Others	34	0.01
Turnout		590,391	41.99

== Op-eds authored ==
- 70 Former U.S. senators: The Senate is Failing to Perform its Constitutional Duties (co-signed with 69 other former U.S. senators) –published by The Washington Post on February 25, 2020
- Democrats Aren’t Just Celebrating Black History. We’re Making It. –published by the Chicago Tribune on February 23, 2024

== See also ==
- Black women in American politics
- List of African-American United States senators
- List of African-American United States Senate candidates
- Women in the United States Senate

Party political offices
Preceded by Alan Dixon	Democratic nominee for U.S. Senator from Illinois (Class 3); 1992, 1998	Succeeded by Barack Obama
U.S. Senate
Preceded by Alan Dixon	United States Senator (Class 3) from Illinois; 1993–1999; Served alongside: Paul Simon, Dick Durbin	Succeeded by Peter Fitzgerald
Diplomatic posts
Preceded by Joe Beeman	United States Ambassador to New Zealand; 1999–2001	Succeeded by Philip Wall; Acting
Preceded by Joe Beeman	United States Ambassador to Samoa; 2000–2001	Succeeded by Philip Wall; Acting
U.S. order of precedence (ceremonial)
Preceded by Joe Donnelly as Former U.S. Senator	Order of precedence of the United States	Succeeded by Peter Fitzgerald as Former U.S. Senator
