= Peter Fitzgerald (politician) =

American politician (born 1960)

Pete Fitzgerald
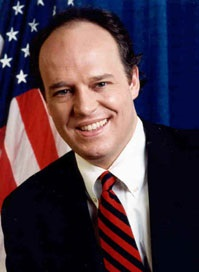

United States Senator from Illinois
- In office January 3, 1999 – January 3, 2005
- Preceded by: Carol Moseley Braun
- Succeeded by: Barack Obama

Member of the Illinois Senate from the 27th district
- In office January 13, 1993 – November 16, 1998
- Preceded by: Virginia B. MacDonald
- Succeeded by: Wendell E. Jones

Personal details
- Born: Peter Gosselin Fitzgerald; October 20, 1960 (age 65) Elgin, Illinois, U.S.
- Party: Republican
- Spouse: Nina Fitzgerald
- Education: Dartmouth College (BA); Aristotelian University (attended); University of Michigan (JD)

Peter Gosselin Fitzgerald (born October 20, 1960) is an American retired lawyer and politician who served as a United States senator from Illinois. A member of the Republican Party, he served from 1999 to 2005. Fitzgerald defeated Democratic incumbent Carol Moseley Braun in 1998, becoming the first Republican to win a U.S. Senate race in Illinois since Charles Percy twenty years earlier. He had previously served in the Illinois State Senate from 1993 to 1998.

Known as a maverick for his willingness to break party lines, Fitzgerald retired from the Senate in 2005 and was succeeded by Barack Obama. After retiring from politics, he and his wife moved to McLean, Virginia. The son of millionaire banking magnate Gerald Francis Fitzgerald, Peter founded Chain Bridge Bank in 2007.

== Early life ==
Born in Elgin, Illinois, one of five children of Gerald Francis and Marjorie (née Gosselin) Fitzgerald, Fitzgerald spent most of his life in Inverness, a northwestern suburb of Chicago.

He graduated from Portsmouth Abbey School, a Catholic boarding school in 1978, and from Dartmouth College in 1982. He completed his post-graduate studies as a Rotary Scholar at Aristotelian University in Greece, and earned his J.D. degree from the University of Michigan in 1986. His family has been continuously involved in commercial banking since the mid-1940s. His father built Suburban Bancorp, a chain of suburban banks, by aggressively founding and buying banks around the Chicago suburbs, which he sold in 1994 to a subsidiary of the Bank of Montreal for $246 million. Fitzgerald ran for the Illinois House of Representatives in 1988, but lost the Republican primary to James M. Kirkland by 1.15%.

== Political career ==
=== Illinois Senate ===
Fitzgerald was first elected to the Illinois Senate in 1992. He was a member of a group of conservative state senators elected in 1992. They often challenged the leadership of the Illinois Republican Party and were dubbed the "Fab Five." The group also included Steve Rauschenberger, Dave Syverson, Patrick O'Malley, and Chris Lauzen.

=== 1994 congressional bid ===
Fitzgerald challenged long-time incumbent Republican congressman Phil Crane in the 1994 Republican primary for Illinois' 8th congressional district. In a multi-candidate field, Fitzgerald lost to Crane 40% to 33%.

=== 1998 senatorial campaign ===
Fitzgerald announced his intention to challenge one-term Democratic incumbent U.S. Senator Carol Moseley Braun in the 1998 election. He faced Illinois Comptroller Loleta Didrickson in the Republican primary. Didrickson had the support of the state Republican party, including Governor Jim Edgar and former Republican presidential nominee Bob Dole, who served as her national campaign chairman. A hard-fought primary ensued, and Fitzgerald narrowly defeated the establishment candidate, becoming the Republican nominee.

Despite great support from Republicans and Independents, he had alienated some of the party establishment during the primary. Meanwhile, Braun was helped by notable Democrats such as First Lady Hillary Clinton and U.S. Congressman Luis V. Gutierrez; final polling had the candidates running even. Fitzgerald defeated Moseley Braun in the general election by a 2.9% margin.

He was the first Republican in Illinois to win a U.S. Senate race in 20 years and the only Republican challenger in the country to defeat an incumbent Democratic senator in the 1998 election cycle.

=== U.S. Senate tenure ===
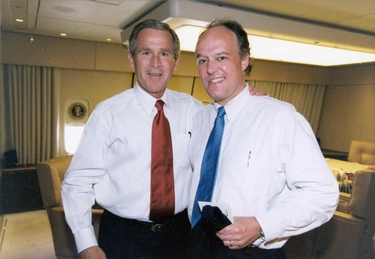
Fitzgerald with President George W. Bush on Air Force One in 2002

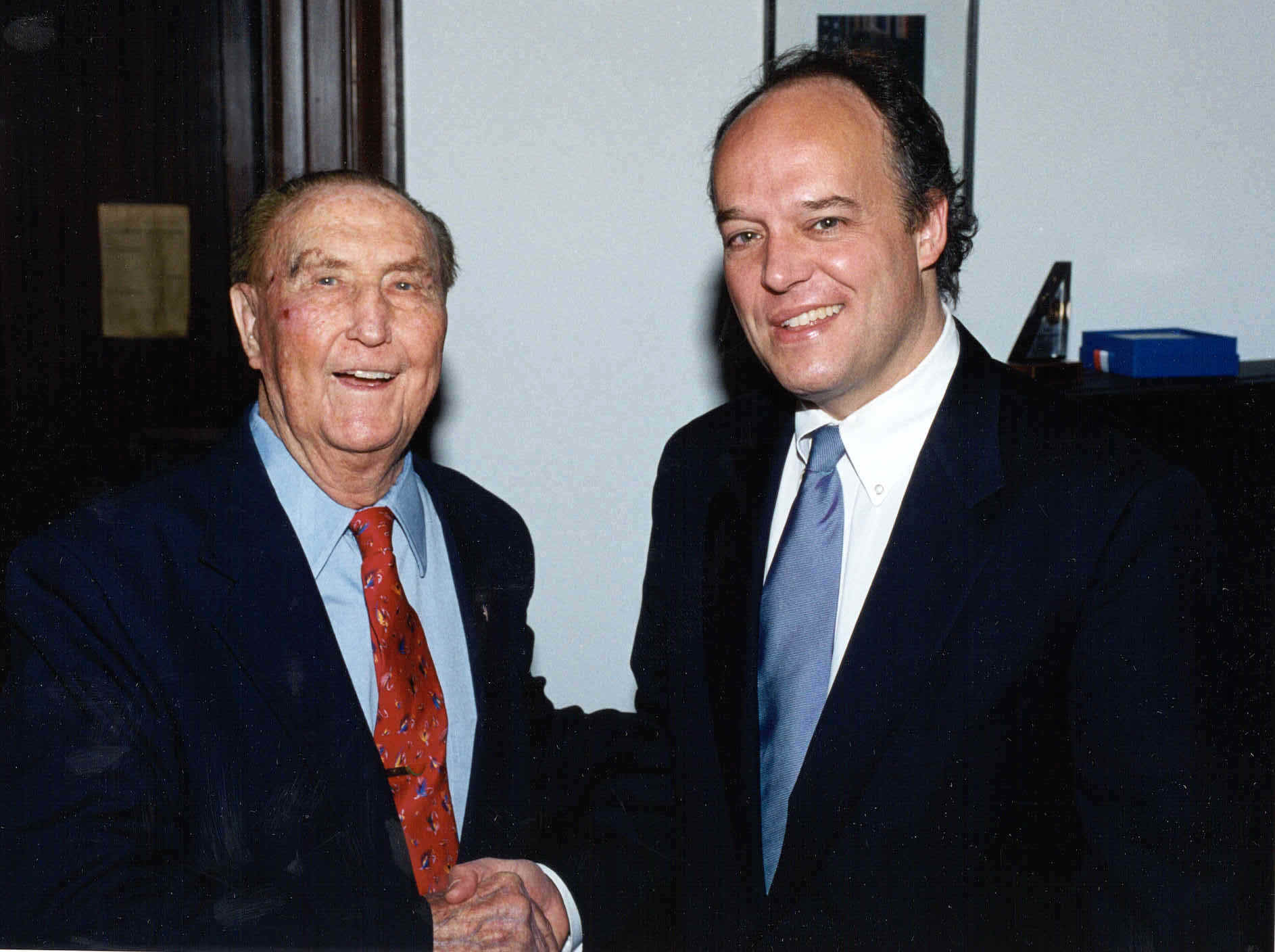
Fitzgerald with South Carolina Senator Strom Thurmond

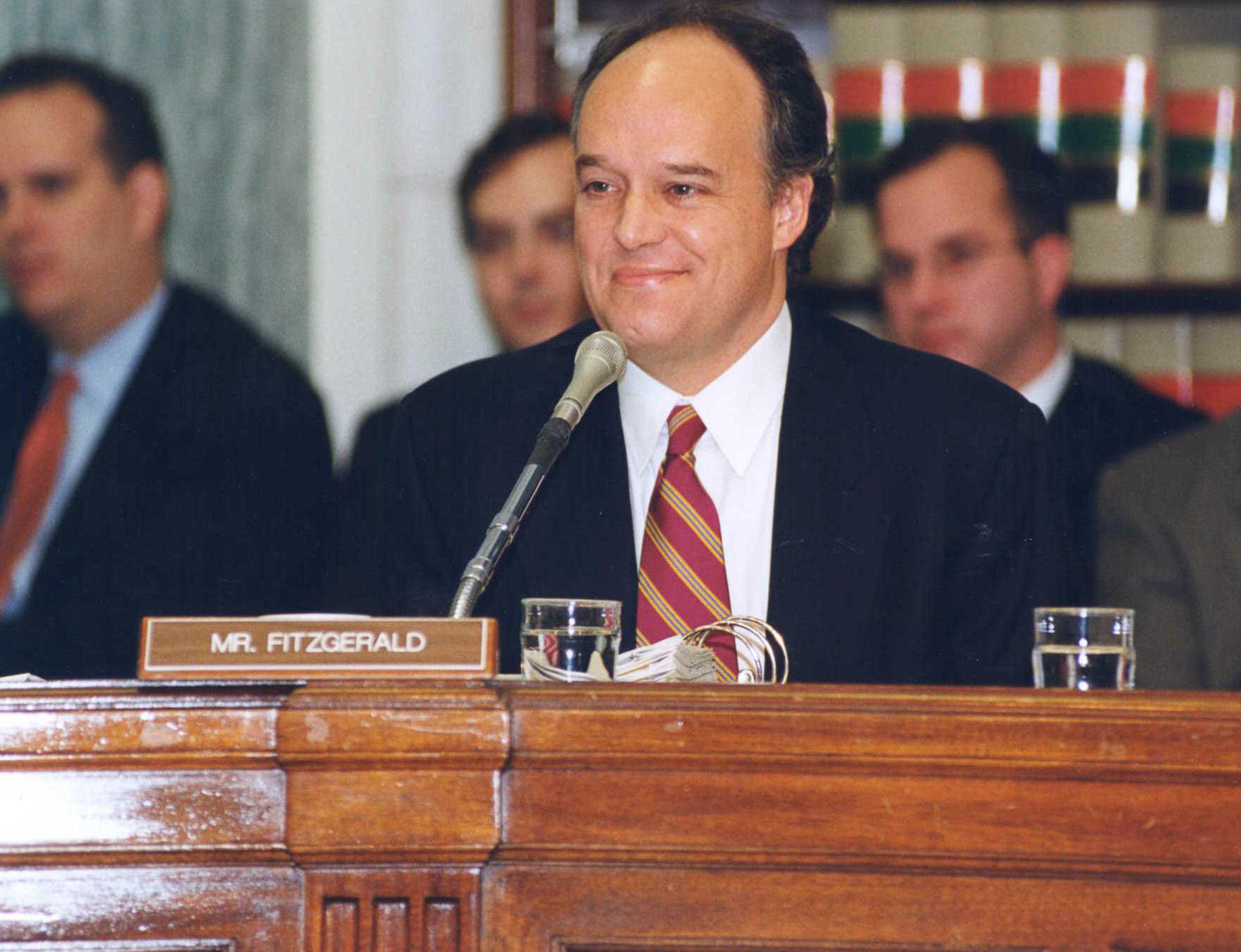
Fitzgerald attends a Senate Commerce Committee hearing in 2002.

Fitzgerald had two major moments in the spotlight in the United States Senate, the first in 2000 when he filibustered a massive federal spending bill because it included funds for the Lincoln Presidential Library in Springfield. He accused Republican governor George Ryan, who later served a six-and-a-half-year prison sentence on a corruption conviction, of opposing competitive bidding so he could dole money to political allies, saying "I want Illinois to get a $150 million (Abraham Lincoln) library, not a $50 million library that just happens to cost $150 million." His second major moment was following the September 11, 2001 terrorist attacks, when Congress quickly passed a massive bailout measure for most of the major airlines, which were in trouble financially. Standing alone out of all members of the U.S. Senate, Fitzgerald delivered a speech, "Who will bail out the American taxpayer", arguing that the airlines would simply go through the money and remain financially unstable. The bill passed 96–1.

Fitzgerald was staunchly conservative on such issues as opposition to abortion (except to save the life of the mother), gay marriage, and taxes, but on some issues he broke with his conservative colleagues, particularly environmental issues; he opposed drilling in the Arctic National Wildlife Refuge throughout his tenure in the U.S. Senate. Fitzgerald also supported "reasonable" gun control, immigration reform, and the McCain–Feingold campaign finance reform legislation.

Throughout his tenure in the U.S. Senate, Fitzgerald battled with the state Republican Party leadership. He insisted on the appointment of an out-of-state U.S. Attorney, Patrick Fitzgerald (unrelated) to investigate corruption in the Illinois state government. Although state party officials wanted a "friendly" attorney for Illinois, Fitzgerald insisted on someone who did not have friends or enemies in the Illinois government. Several indictments resulted, including that of former Republican Governor George Ryan, who was eventually convicted of several criminal abuses of authority, and Democratic Governor Rod Blagojevich, who many years later was convicted of attempting to sell the Senate seat vacated by Fitzgerald's successor and future President Barack Obama. The scandal was seen as ensuring Illinois' reputation as one of the most politically corrupt states.

When the Republican establishment made clear that they would not support him for reelection, Fitzgerald announced he would retire at the end of his current term. Republicans nominated businessman Jack Ryan for the seat in the primaries. However, Ryan was later pressured by the Illinois Republican Party to withdraw because of publicity received from the contents of his previously-sealed divorce case. Fitzgerald stood by Ryan and supported him, despite the pressure from the media and the Illinois Republican party on Ryan to withdraw. Just 86 days before the election, the party drafted Maryland native Alan Keyes as the nominee. Keyes was accused of "carpetbagging," and was defeated by Barack Obama by more than 40 percent of the vote. It has been stated that Fitzgerald, who was popular among independents, stood the best chance of retaining the seat and defeating Obama, who went on to win the presidential election just four years later. During his final months in office, Fox News ran an op-ed on Fitzgerald, "Retiring Senator Stood Up for Principles."

== Post-political career ==
Fitzgerald is the founder and Chairman of Chain Bridge Bank, N.A. in McLean, Virginia He serves on the board of trustees of the National Constitution Center in Philadelphia, which is a museum dedicated to the U.S. Constitution.

== Electoral history ==
- 1998 Republican Primary – U.S. Senate
  - Peter Fitzgerald (R), 51.83%
  - Loleta Didrickson (R), 48.17%
- 1998 General Election – U.S. Senate
  - Peter Fitzgerald (R), 50.35%
  - Carol Moseley Braun (D), 47.44%

Party political offices
Preceded by Richard Williamson	Republican nominee for U.S. Senator from Illinois (Class 3); 1998	Succeeded by Jack Ryan; Withdrew
U.S. Senate
Preceded by Carol Moseley Braun	U.S. Senator (Class 3) from Illinois; 1999–2005; Served alongside: Dick Durbin	Succeeded by Barack Obama
Honorary titles
Preceded by Rick Santorum	Baby of the Senate; 1999–2003	Succeeded by John E. Sununu
U.S. order of precedence (ceremonial)
Preceded by Carol Moseley Braun as Former U.S. Senator	Order of precedence of the United States	Succeeded by Mark Kirk as Former U.S. Senator
