= Howard Dean 2004 presidential campaign =

American political campaign

Howard Dean for President 2004
- Campaign: 2004 United States presidential election (Democratic Party primaries)
- Candidate: Howard Dean; Governor of Vermont (1991–2003)
- Affiliation: Democratic Party
- EC formed: May 31, 2002
- Announced: June 23, 2003
- Suspended: February 18, 2004
- Receipts: (2008-01-31)
- Slogan: Dean for America

Website
- Howard Dean 2004 (archived – Jan 30, 2004)

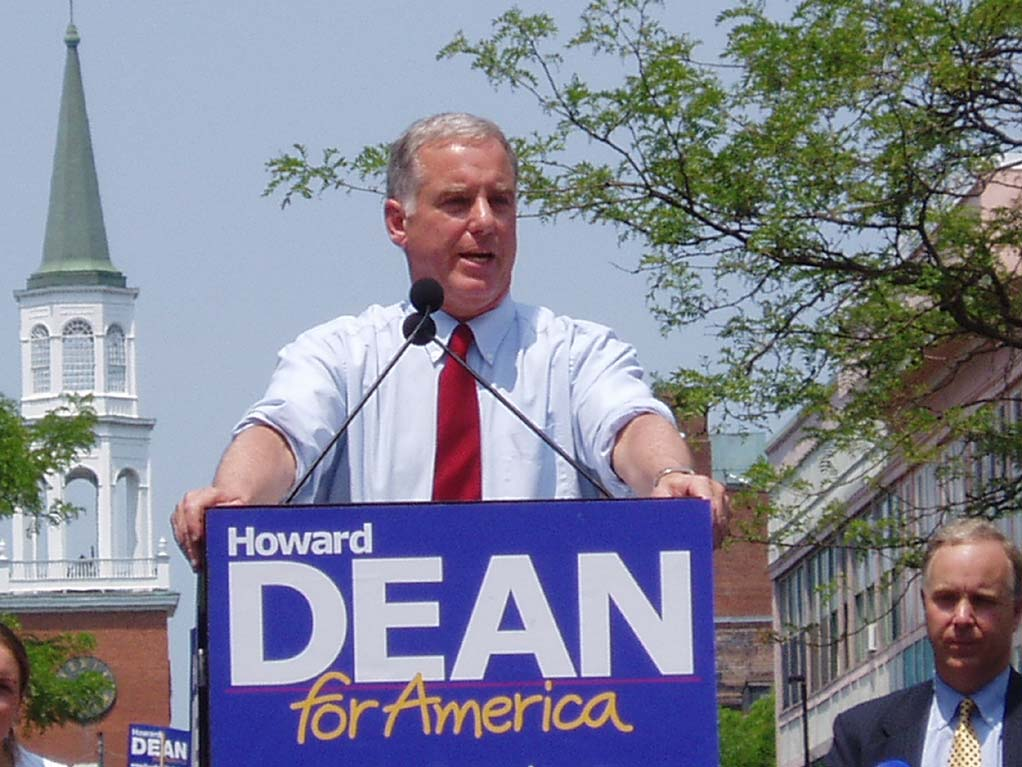
Dean announcing his candidacy

The 2004 presidential campaign of Howard Dean, 79th Governor of Vermont, began when he formed an exploratory committee to evaluate a presidential election campaign on May 31, 2002. Dean then formally announced his intention to compete in the 2004 Democratic primaries to seek the Democratic Party's nomination for President on June 23, 2003. Dean dropped out of the race in February 2004 after a poor showing in the Wisconsin primary which was further impacted by his I Have A Scream speech.

== Announcement ==
Dean officially announced his candidacy on June 23, 2003, at a rally in his home state of Vermont, overlooking the Church Street Marketplace, in the heart of Burlington (Vermont's largest city). During his announcement speech, Dean stressed the importance of universal health care, and fiscal responsibility.

== Fundraising ==
In the "Invisible Primary" of raising campaign funds, Howard Dean led the Democratic pack in the early stages of the 2004 campaign. Among the candidates, he ranked first in total raised ($25.4 million as of September 30, 2003) and first in cash-on-hand ($12.4 million). However, even this performance paled next to that of George W. Bush, who by that date had raised $84.6 million for the Republican primary campaign, in which he had no strong challenger. Prior to the 2004 primary season, the Democratic record for most money raised in one quarter by a primary candidate was held by Bill Clinton in 1995, raising $10.3 million during a campaign in which he had no primary opponent. In the third quarter of 2003, the Dean campaign raised $14.8 million, shattering Clinton's record. All told, Dean's campaign raised around $50 million.

While presidential campaigns have traditionally obtained finance by tapping wealthy, established political donors, Dean's funds came largely in small donations over the Internet; the average overall donation was just under $80. This method of fundraising offered several important advantages over traditional fundraising, in addition to the inherent media interest in what was then a novelty. First, raising money on the Internet was relatively inexpensive, compared to conventional methods such as events, telemarketing, and direct mail campaigns. Secondly, as donors on average contributed far less than the legal limit ($2,000 per person), the campaign could continue to re-solicit them throughout the election season.

Dean's director of grassroots fundraising, Larry Biddle, came up with the idea of the popular fundraising "bat", an image of a cartoon baseball player and bat which appeared on the site every time the campaign launched a fundraising challenge. The bat encouraged Web site visitors to contribute money immediately through their credit cards. This would lead to the bat filling up like a thermometer with the red color indicating the total funds. The site often took suggestions from the netroots on their blog. One of these suggestions led to one of the campaign's biggest accomplishments– an image of Dean eating a turkey sandwich encouraged supporters to donate $250,000 in three days to match a big-donor dinner by Vice President Dick Cheney. The online contributions from that day matched what Cheney made from his fundraiser.

In November 2003, after a much-publicized online vote among his followers, Dean became the first Democrat to forgo federal matching funds (and the spending limits that go with them) since the system was established in 1974. (John Kerry later followed his lead.) In addition to state-by-state spending limits for the primaries, the system limits a candidate to spending only $44.6 million until the Democratic National Convention in July, which sum would almost certainly run out soon after the early primary season. (George W. Bush declined federal matching funds in 2000 and did so again for the 2004 campaign.)

In a sign that the Dean campaign was starting to think beyond the primaries, they began in late 2003 to speak of a "$100 revolution" in which two million Americans would give $100 in order to compete with Bush.

Political commentators have stated that the fundraising of Barack Obama, with its emphasis on small donors and the internet, refined and built upon the model that Dean's campaign pioneered.

== Positions ==
=== Health care ===
A former medical doctor, Dean called for comprehensive universal health care in the US. He proposed an annual $88 billion on health care programs in the nation as well as wanting tax credits to help workers of moderate income buy "affordable" coverage similar to that offered to federal employees, with extra insurance subsidies for companies employing less than 50 people. He also proposed spending nearly $1 trillion over 10 years on health insurance. He even stressed the need for expanding state health care programs for children throughout his campaign.

=== Education ===
Dean opposed using taxpayer-financed vouchers for tuition at parochial or other private schools, and promised to rework federal annual testing in grades 3 through 8 while allowing for more state and local control. He also guaranteed that people would not have to pay more than 10% of their income toward loans after post-secondary graduation as he would provide $10,000 a year in federal aid for university or high-skills learning.

=== Economy and taxes ===
Dean proposed a radically different tax plan than President Bush's which would repeal all of the Bush tax cuts and replace them with tax cuts on the middle class. Throughout his campaign, he stressed the need for lowering taxes on the middle class while raising them on the upper class. He also promised to renegotiate components of the North American Free Trade Agreement (NAFTA) and other free trade agreements with foreign powers, and to "put the U.S. on a path to a balanced budget". However, he never specifically stated any deficit reduction proposals other than repealing the Bush tax cuts.

=== Foreign policy ===
With the guidance of his chief foreign policy advisor, Danny Sebright, Dean made the war in Iraq a pillar of his campaign. He proposed to transfer sovereignty to "credible and legitimate" Iraqi leaders and "encourage the United Nations to take responsibility for this political transition." He also expressed strong support for the War in Afghanistan, saying "One priority should be strengthening our bonds with other countries, especially our historical allies in a world growing ever more interdependent."

Dean also supported opening talks with North Korea, tripling American financing to $30 billion over 10 years to combat unconventional weapons around the world, and approving the use of force to halt genocide.

== Endorsements ==
Dean quickly rose above his outsider image, "topping all his rivals in every measure of a successful candidate – money, organization, momentum, polls, and endorsements". He received a particularly powerful boost when two of the country's largest labor unions, the American Federation of State, County and Municipal Employees (AFSCME) and the Service Employees International Union (SEIU), simultaneously endorsed him in November 2003.

On December 9, 2003, former Vice President Al Gore endorsed Dean for the nomination. Speaking in Harlem, the Democratic Party's previous nominee said, "I'm very proud and honored to endorse Howard Dean to be the next president of the United States of America ... In a field of great candidates, one candidate clearly now stands out, and so I'm asking all of you to join in this grassroots movement to elect Howard Dean." Gore's endorsement was highly coveted, and CNN reported that it "could cement Dean's status as the leading Democratic candidate heading into the kickoff contests now just weeks away in Iowa and New Hampshire."

Less than a month later, Bill Bradley – a popular former U.S. Senator from New Jersey and Gore's challenger in the 2000 primaries – also endorsed Dean. Within days he was joined by Iowa's junior U.S. Senator, Tom Harkin. A previous presidential candidate himself, Harkin enthusiastically promoted Dean as "the Harry Truman of our time ... the kind of plainspoken Democrat we need". Coming just ten days before the Iowa caucuses on January 19, Harkin's support was considered "a key boost to the embattled front-runner".

Another high-profile endorsement followed five days after Harkin's. Former U.S. Senator and ambassador Carol Moseley Braun, whose own presidential candidacy had been endorsed by the National Organization for Women, shut down her struggling campaign and gave her support to Dean.

== Results ==
Dean finished third or lower in most nominating contests throughout the primary season. The exceptions were New Hampshire, Michigan, Washington, Maine and Vermont.

=== Iowa and the "Dean scream" ===
Iowa results by county: Kerry: 30–40%; 40–50%; 50–60%; Edwards: 20–30%; 30–40%; 40–50%; 50–60%; Dean: 30–40%; 40–50%; Tie

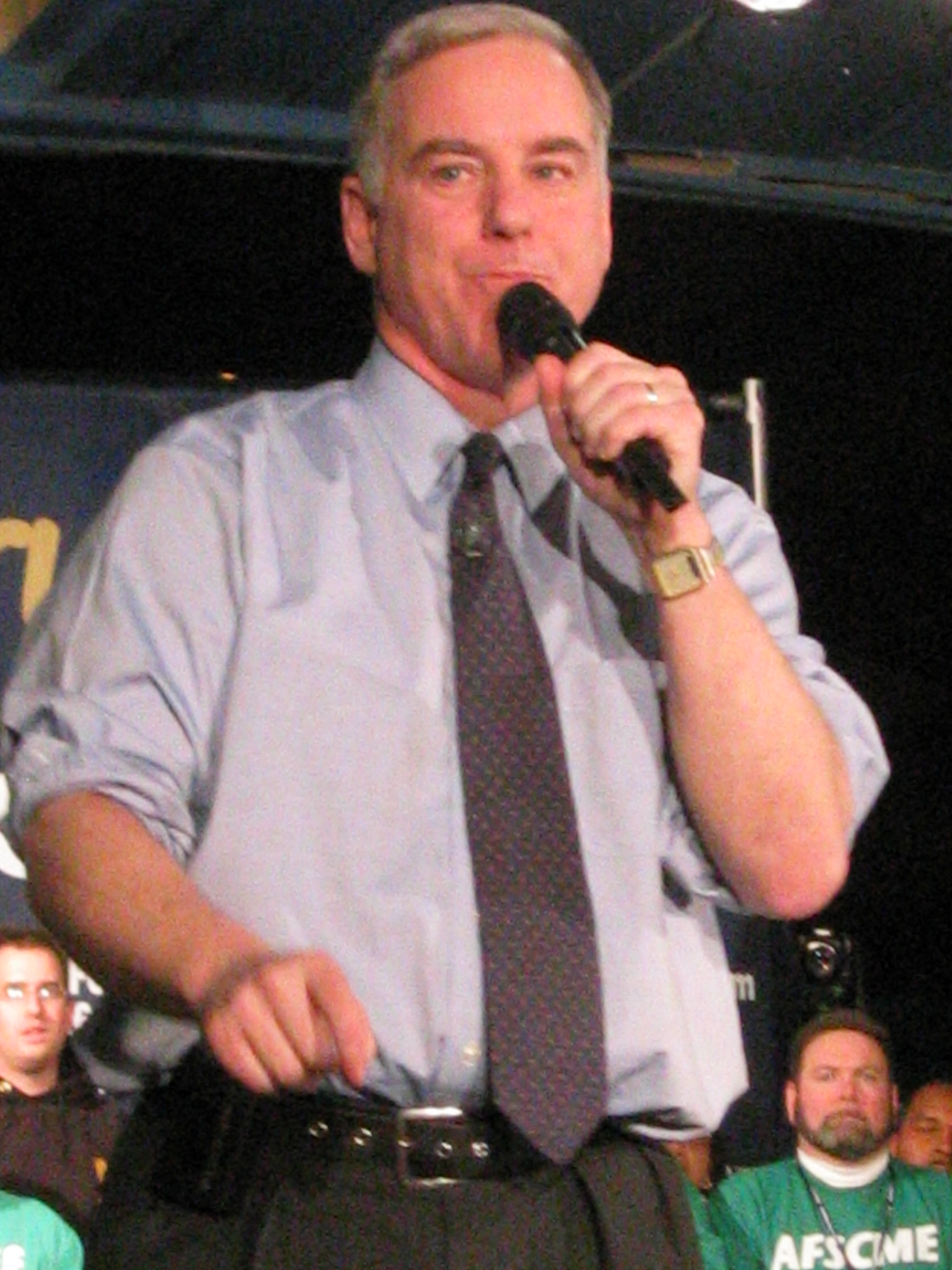
Dean delivering his infamous "I Have A Scream" speech

Polling throughout the primary campaign consistently showed Dean either in first place, or second behind Dick Gephardt. However, last minute surges by rivals John Kerry and John Edwards as well as negative campaigning between the Dean and Gephardt campaigns resulted in an 11th hour slump for both campaigns. In a poll released by the Des Moines Register just before Caucus Day, Dean registered in third place with 20%, behind Kerry with 26%, and Edwards with 23%, but ahead of Dick Gephardt with 18%. Throughout Caucus night, Dean was in a fight with Gephardt for third place in Iowa behind Kerry and Edwards. With 100% of precincts reporting, Kerry received 38%, Edwards received 32%, and Dean came in third with 18% while Gephardt finished in fourth with just 11% of caucus support. Dean's public address that night was widely rebroadcast and portrayed as a media gaffe that ended his campaign.

Dean, who had been suffering with a severe bout of the flu for several days, attended a post-caucus rally for his volunteers at the Val-Air Ballroom in West Des Moines, Iowa and delivered his concession speech, aimed at cheering up those in attendance. Dean was shouting over the cheers of his enthusiastic audience, but the crowd noise was being filtered out by his unidirectional microphone, leaving only his full-throated exhortations audible to the television viewers. To those at home, he seemed to raise his voice out of sheer emotion.

According to a Newsday editorial written by Verne Gay, some members of the television audience criticized the speech as loud, peculiar, and unpresidential. In particular, this quote from the speech was aired repeatedly in the days following the caucus:

Not only are we going to New Hampshire, Tom Harkin, we're going to South Carolina and Oklahoma and Arizona and North Dakota and New Mexico, and we're going to California and Texas and New York. ... And we're going to South Dakota and Oregon and Washington and Michigan, and then we're going to Washington, D.C., to take back the White House! Yeah!

Senator Harkin was on stage with Dean, holding his suit jacket. This final "Yeah!" with its unusual tone that Dean later said was due to the cracking of his hoarse voice, has become known in American political jargon as the "Dean Scream" or the "I Have A Scream" speech. Comedians and late-night comedy show hosts such as Dave Chappelle and Conan O'Brien satirized, mocked, and popularized the sound bite, beginning a media onslaught that many believe contributed immensely to his poor showing in the subsequent races.

Dean conceded that the speech did not project the best image, jokingly referring to it as a "crazy, red-faced rant" on the Late Show with David Letterman. In an interview later that week with Diane Sawyer, he said he was "a little sheepish ... but I'm not apologetic." Sawyer and many others in the national broadcast news media later expressed some regret about overplaying the story. In fact, CNN issued a public apology and admitted in a statement that they indeed may have "overplayed" the incident. The incessant replaying of the "Dean Scream" by the press became a debate on the topic of whether Dean was the victim of media bias. The scream scene was shown an estimated 633 times by cable and broadcast news networks in just four days following the incident, a number that does not include talk shows and local news broadcasts. However, those who were in the actual audience that day insist that they were not aware of the infamous "scream" until they returned to their hotel rooms and saw it on TV. Dean said after the general election in 2004 that his microphone only picked up his voice and did not also capture the loud cheering he received from the audience as a result of the speech. On January 27 Dean finished second to Kerry in the New Hampshire primary. As late as one week before the first votes were cast in Iowa's caucuses, Dean had enjoyed a 30% lead in New Hampshire opinion polls; accordingly, this loss represented another major setback to his campaign.

=== New Hampshire ===
After both Kerry and Edwards defeated Howard Dean in the Iowa Caucuses, the Dean campaign retreated to New Hampshire, where polls consistently showed them in the lead, and where Dean hoped for a comeback by defeating Senator Kerry who came from neighboring Massachusetts.

Polling after the Iowa Caucuses consistently showed Governor Dean behind Senator Kerry by a wide margin in the run up to the New Hampshire Primary. A poll released from Franklin Pierce College showed Kerry leading by as much as 30%–16%. However, after a substantial effort by Dean on the campaign trail, the final poll conducted by Marist College showed Kerry leading 36%–27%.

However, despite signs showing a Dean surge, Howard Dean lost to John Kerry in the New Hampshire primary 38%–26% which set the tone for future defeats at the hands of Kerry and others.

Iowa and New Hampshire were the first in a string of losses for the Dean campaign, culminating in a third place showing in the Wisconsin primary on February 17. Two days before the Wisconsin primary, campaign advisor Steve Grossman announced through an article written by The New York Times Dean campaign correspondent Jodi Wilgoren that he would offer his services to any of the other major candidates "should Dean not win in Wisconsin." This scoop further undermined Dean's campaign. Grossman later issued a public apology. The next day, Dean announced that his candidacy had "come to an end", though he continued to urge people to vote for him, so that Dean delegates would be selected for the convention and could influence the party platform. He later won the Vermont primary on Super Tuesday, March 2. This latter victory, a surprise even to Dean, was due in part to the lack of a serious anti-Kerry candidate in Vermont (John Edwards had declined to put his name on the state's ballot, expecting Dean to win in a landslide), and in part to a television ad produced, funded, and aired in Vermont by grassroots Dean supporters.

=== Wisconsin ===
After grueling losses to John Kerry in New Hampshire, Michigan, Washington as well as other states, Howard Dean staked his entire campaign on favorable showings in the Wisconsin primary scheduled to take place on February 17, 2004

Following results in 7 Nominating Contests on February 3, 2004, Governor Dean re-organized his strategy, focusing on the Wisconsin primary as a way to upset front runner John Kerry. Dean canceled events throughout Michigan to be able to focus on Wisconsin as well as increasing staff members within Wisconsin. Dean also made a pledge (which he would later retract) that Wisconsin was a "must win" state for him in a fund raising e-mail to supporters. Despite being far behind Kerry in delegates and in popular vote, Dean stressed that Wisconsin could "turn around" the fate of his campaign. Dean also implied that it would give him momentum to win in Super Tuesday nominating contests.

As results were beginning to pour in, major news agencies were quick in projecting Governor Dean as coming in third in Wisconsin based on Exit Polling data alone. Final results from Wisconsin showed John Kerry winning with 40% of the vote followed by John Edwards with 34% and Howard Dean coming in third with 18%. As a result of poor contests Dean exited the race the next morning.

=== Vermont ===
The 2004 Vermont Democratic Primary was held on March 2, 2004 the same day as 9 other states including California, New York, and Georgia, a day dubbed "Super Tuesday" for its massive amount of primaries and caucuses held on a particular Tuesday. One of these contests was in Vermont, where Dean had been governor.

Polls closed in Vermont at 7:00 EST along with polls in the state of Georgia. Based on exit polls, CNN projected Howard Dean the winner there.

Much of the reason for Dean's success in his home state of Vermont without campaigning was largely due to the fact that John Edwards was not on the ballot in the state. In January, when Howard Dean was still considered the front-runner, Edwards and several other candidates — Rep. Dick Gephardt of Missouri, Al Sharpton and Sen. Joe Lieberman of Connecticut — decided not to file to get on the primary ballot in Dean's home state. The final results for the Vermont primary were Dean with 58%, Kerry with 34% and Kucinich with 4%

=== Key results ===
| Contest | Place | Percentage |
|---|---|---|
| Iowa | 3rd | 17% |
| New Hampshire | 2nd | 26% |
| Arizona | 3rd | 14% |
| Delaware | 4th | 10% |
| Missouri | 3rd | 9% |
| New Mexico | 3rd | 16% |
| North Dakota | 3rd | 12% |
| Oklahoma | 5th | 4% |
| South Carolina | 5th | 5% |
| Michigan | 2nd | 17% |
| Washington | 2nd | 30% |
| Maine | 2nd | 28% |
| Tennessee | 4th | 4% |
| Virginia | 4th | 7% |
| Nevada | 2nd | 17% |
| Wisconsin | 3rd | 18% |
| Vermont | 1st | 54% |

Dean won the nominating contest (Vermont)
Dean came in either second or third in the nominating Contest (Iowa, New Hampshire, Arizona, Missouri, New Mexico, North Dakota, Michigan, Washington, Maine, and Wisconsin)
Dean came in 4th or lower in the nominating contest (Delaware, Oklahoma, South Carolina, Tennessee, Virginia)

== Withdrawal ==
Dean withdrew from the Democratic race on February 18, 2004, following poor showings in the Wisconsin primary. Dean announced his decision at a rally in Burlington, Vermont, saying "I am no longer actively pursuing the presidency". Dean continued to advise his supporters to fight on saying "Sending delegates to the convention only continues to energize our party. Fight on in the caucuses; we are on the ballots. Use your network to send progressive delegates to the convention in Boston. ... We are not going away, we are staying together, unified, all of us."

After withdrawing from the campaign, Dean founded the group Democracy for America in March 2004 a month after his withdrawal from the presidential race. The group was dedicated to ensuring a Democratic victory in the 2004 Election.

=== Endorsement ===
Dean endorsed presumptive nominee Senator John Kerry of Massachusetts on March 25, 2004 at a rally at George Washington University. Dean, who was one of the favored candidates among young voters, was enthusiastically received by the crowd of college students.

There had been some speculation that Howard Dean would endorse John Edwards before the Super Tuesday nominating contests on March 2, as Edwards's political stances were more in line with Dean's. However, Dean did not comment on the Presidential field before Super Tuesday, when John Edwards dropped out of the race after failing to win a single contest.

== Fundraising ==
In the "invisible primary" of raising campaign dollars, Howard Dean led the Democratic pack in the early stages of the 2004 campaign. Among the candidates, he ranked first in total raised ($25.4 million as of September 30, 2003) and first in cash-on-hand ($12.4 million). However, even this performance paled next to that of George W. Bush, who by that date had raised $84.6 million for the Republican primary campaign, in which he had no real challenger. Prior to the 2004 primary season, the Democratic record for most money raised in one quarter by a primary candidate was held by Bill Clinton in 1995, raising $10.3 million during a campaign in which he had no primary opponent. In the third quarter of 2003, the Dean campaign raised $14.8 million, shattering Clinton's record. All told, Dean's campaign raised around $50 million.

While presidential campaigns have traditionally obtained finance by tapping wealthy, established political donors, Dean's funds came largely in small donations over the Internet; gaining 350,000 donors with the average overall donation size just under $80. This method of fundraising offered several important advantages over traditional fundraising, in addition to the inherent media interest in what was then a novelty. First, raising money on the Internet was relatively inexpensive, compared to conventional methods such as events, telemarketing, and direct mail campaigns. Secondly, as donors on average contributed far less than the legal limit ($2,000 per individual), the campaign could continue to resolicit them throughout the election season.

Dean's director of grassroots fundraising, Larry Biddle, came up with the idea of the popular fundraising "bat", an image of a cartoon baseball player and bat which appeared on the site every time the campaign launched a fundraising challenge. The bat encouraged Web site visitors to contribute money immediately through their credit cards. This would lead to the bat filling up like a thermometer with the red color indicating the total funds. The site often took suggestions from the netroots on their blog. One of these suggestions led to one of the campaigns biggest accomplishments — an image of Dean eating a turkey sandwich encouraged supporters to donate $250,000 in three days to match a big-donor dinner by Vice President Dick Cheney. The online contributions from that day matched what Cheney made from his fundraiser.

In November 2003, after a much-publicized online vote among his followers, Dean became the first Democrat to forgo federal matching funds (and the spending limits that go with them) since the system was established in 1974. (John Kerry later followed his lead.) In addition to state-by-state spending limits for the primaries, the system limits a candidate to spending only $44.6 million until the Democratic National Convention in July, which sum would almost certainly run out soon after the early primary season. (George W. Bush declined federal matching funds in 2000 and did so again for the 2004 campaign.)

In a sign that the Dean campaign was starting to think beyond the primaries, they began in late 2003 to speak of a "$100 revolution" in which 2 million Americans would give $100 in order to compete with Bush.

== Impact ==
While his presidential bid ultimately ended in failure, Dean's campaign served to frame the White House race by tapping into voters' concerns about the war in Iraq, energizing Democrats, and sharpening criticism of incumbent George W. Bush. Dean's lone Pennsylvania delegate, State Rep. Mark B. Cohen of Philadelphia, said Dean's decision, ultimately emulated by Kerry, to forgo primary federal matching funds and exceed the matching fund spending limits "marked the day the Democratic Party became a serious contender for national power in 2004."

On October 11, 2007, it was reported that Leonardo DiCaprio and George Clooney were in early talks about making a "political thriller" based on Howard Dean's 2004 campaign, tentatively titled Farragut North. The movie is based on a play of the same name, which is also the name of a Washington Metro station, by former Dean communications director Beau Willimon. The movie was released in 2011 as The Ides of March, starring Clooney and Ryan Gosling.

In November 2008, a documentary film about Dean and the campaign, Dean and Me, was released and shown at several film festivals.

== See also ==
- Electoral history of Howard Dean
