= Dean scream =

Incident in 2004 speech by Howard Dean

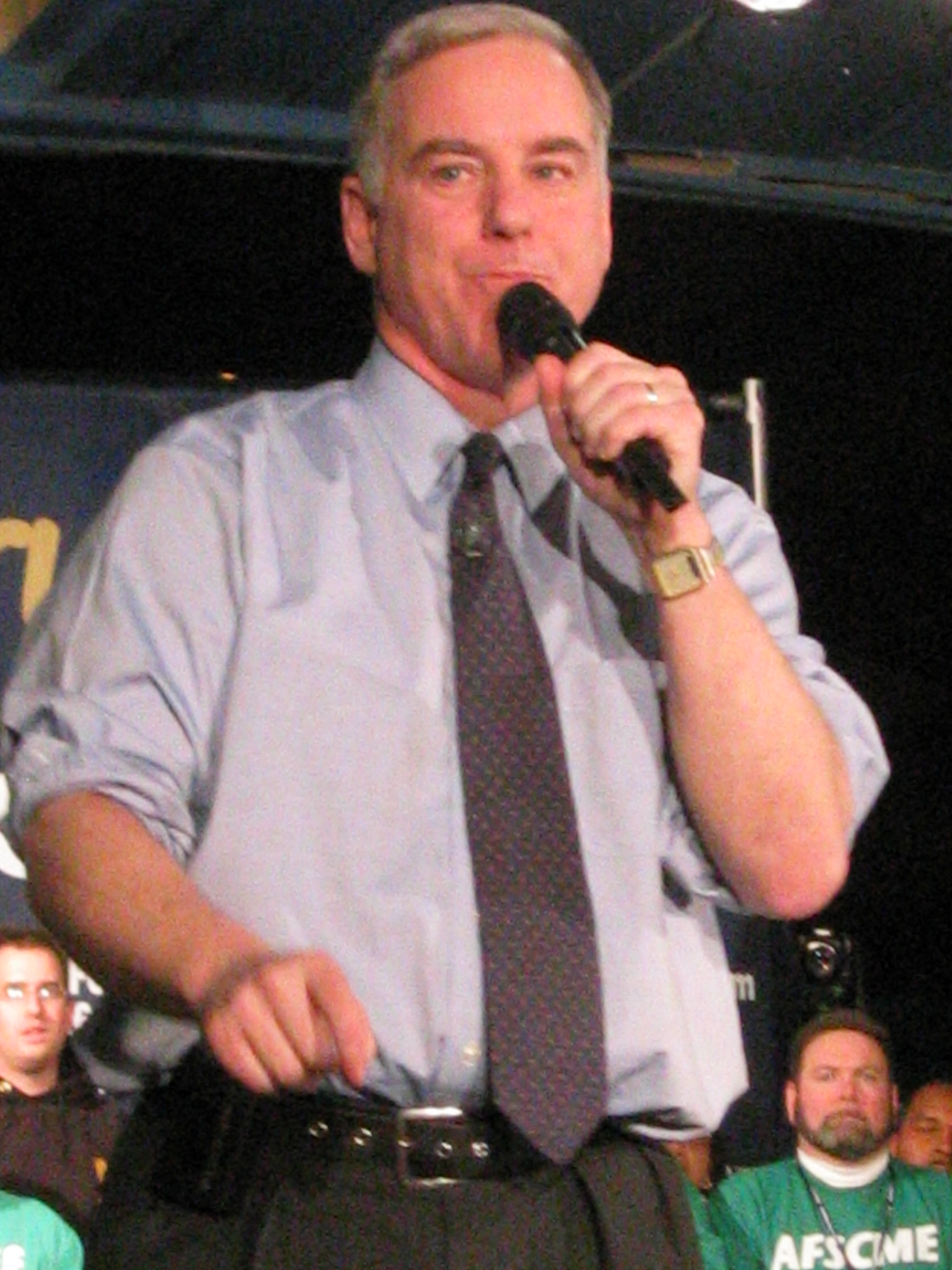
- Dean delivering his speech
- The scream

The Dean scream was an energetic scream by Howard Dean, the former governor of Vermont, on January 19, 2004, during a speech he gave at the Val-Air Ballroom in West Des Moines, Iowa. That night, the presidential candidate had just lost the Iowa caucus to John Kerry and wanted to reassure his supporters. He listed states he would win to a raucous audience, before screaming, "Yeah!" The scream's unusual tone, which Dean later attributed to the cracking of his hoarse voice, immediately attracted media attention. Within four days, it was broadcast 633 times on national news networks and cable channels. The Dean scream is considered the first political meme to go viral online.

Following the scream, Dean lost more primaries and suspended his campaign following his third-place result in Wisconsin. Some commentators have described the speech as a political gaffe that destroyed Dean's campaign by making him sound unpresidential; however, Dean and his campaign staff later commented that he would have lost anyway, due to poor campaign organization. Additionally, Christine Pelosi, Pacific Standard, and historian Robert Thompson all said that Dean's probability of being nominated was already low due to a lack of party insider support, the Iowa loss, and the media's previous painting of Dean as too hot-tempered for the presidency.

== 2004 presidential election and Iowa caucus ==
Vermont governor Howard Dean's 2003–04 presidential campaign began as a huge success in its first several months, garnering popularity from the press and American citizens for his left-leaning populism and anti-Iraq War beliefs; as of fall 2003, he was number one in almost every poll throughout the United States, including those in Iowa and New Hampshire. Dean's Iowa campaign webmaster Adam Mordecai described all of the campaign staff feeling "invincible" initially. However, the amount of press reportage on Dean left little room for the other Democratic candidates to be covered; thus, the Washington establishment, other candidates' campaigns, and the mainstream media focused on his hot-headed public moments to show him as having too little sophistication for the presidential position. Dean was conscious of this and tried to moderate his tone, but often failed as he gave in to the excitement of his audience.

Dean's rankings in the polls started to decline in the three weeks before the Iowa caucus due to the poor operation of his campaign team. Dean blamed his staff for setting it up to be a fight against another primary candidate, that being Dick Gephardt; Mordecai stated a broken voter outreach system caused Dean volunteers to alienate potential supporters by contacting them too many times; and CNN correspondent Kate Albright-Hanna attributed his decreased ratings to the "crazy" image of Dean and his supporters brought upon by the press and the campaigns of his opponents.

Explained Dean campaign manager Joe Trippi, "In Iowa, it was pretty clear we were unraveling, so I was praying that it would somehow hold together before caucus night, that the floor would not collapse on us until the day after. Then we'd have some momentum from a win going into New Hampshire and no one would know it was collapsing." However, John Kerry ended up winning the caucus, Dean coming in third. Tricia Enright, Dean's communications director, summarized the campaign staff's reaction to the results: "You're disappointed we've let down all of these people who worked their hearts out. In their mind, it was their campaign." As Dean recalled his motive when about to speak a post-caucus rally at the Val-Air Ballroom in West Des Moines, Iowa, "You don't suddenly give up and think everything you've done was a waste of time, and I didn't think so. And I was gonna let those kids know that this was not over."

== The rally ==
External videos
- User-created clip of "The Dean Scream", January 19, 2004, C-SPAN
- "Dean 'scream' from the crowd"

Organizer Teri Mills recalled the room being "jam-packed" with 3,000 attendees, and "people were so excited and looking forward to boarding planes to go to New Hampshire." A drunk Mordecai was on stage exciting the audience with Dean and his organizers backstage discussing how to present; as Trippi summarized his thinking process at that moment, "You have millions of Americans watching who have no idea who you are. If the cameras are on you that night, it's your best shot to introduce yourself to America. So that was the plan—win, lose, or draw. But you can't predict how things go once the bus rolls up and he gets out there." Trippi advised Dean, "They're down, go out there and give 'em hell," and Iowa senator Tom Harkin suggested, "Why don't you just throw your jacket off and let her rip." Enright also told the prep shortly before Dean got on stage, "Get ready guys, he's going to be fiery."

When Dean walked on stage, the crowd "just went bananas. It was like a rock star," explained Mills. Those at the event recalled the crowd being so loud they could not even hear Dean; this experience was not reflected in television broadcasts of the rally, as the audio they used was from the unidirectional microphone Dean was holding that significantly decreased the background noise. Taking off his jacket and rolling up the sleeves of his blue shirt, he started his speech with "I'm sure there are some disappointed people here." He then motivated his supporters to keep fighting, and stated what would later be repeated on news stations:

Not only are we going to New Hampshire, Tom Harkin, we're going to South Carolina and Oklahoma and Arizona and North Dakota and New Mexico, and we're going to California and Texas and New York. ... And we're going to South Dakota and Oregon and Washington and Michigan, and then we're going to Washington, D.C., to take back the White House! YEAH!

== Media coverage ==
Dean, campaign staff, and members of the press who were at the ballroom left with the impression of it being an ordinary rally. Explained Dean, "There were 75 print reporters in the room, and I've never talked to one that had any sense that anything unusual was going on." Trippi recalled, "we were all hanging out at the bar afterwards with press, having a beer. And looking up and seeing, repeatedly, this scene of Howard over and over again. So you looked up and went, 'What the? What's going on?' I realized as soon as I saw it that it wasn't going to be good."

Albright-Hanna, a CNN reporter at the event, explained, "there was a sense that it was really loud, but it just felt like a typical rally. Nothing out of the usual happened. Nobody remembered a moment happening at all." She explained that when on the plane to New Hampshire after the rally, "none of the reporters on the press plane were talking about [the Dean scream]"; only when a CNN associate producer brought it up when at New Hampshire was she aware of it. Eric Salzman, who reported Dean's campaign for CBS, revealed it was the network's editors that chose to focus their coverage on the scream despite insistence from journalists at the rally not to: "It was an interesting example of the power of television, because editors said to their reporters, 'Hey, I saw it. I watched it on TV. I know what happened.' And the reporters were trying to say, 'No, it was different if you were there.' And the editors were like, 'Hey. I'm telling you I know what the story is, and this is what we're reporting.'"

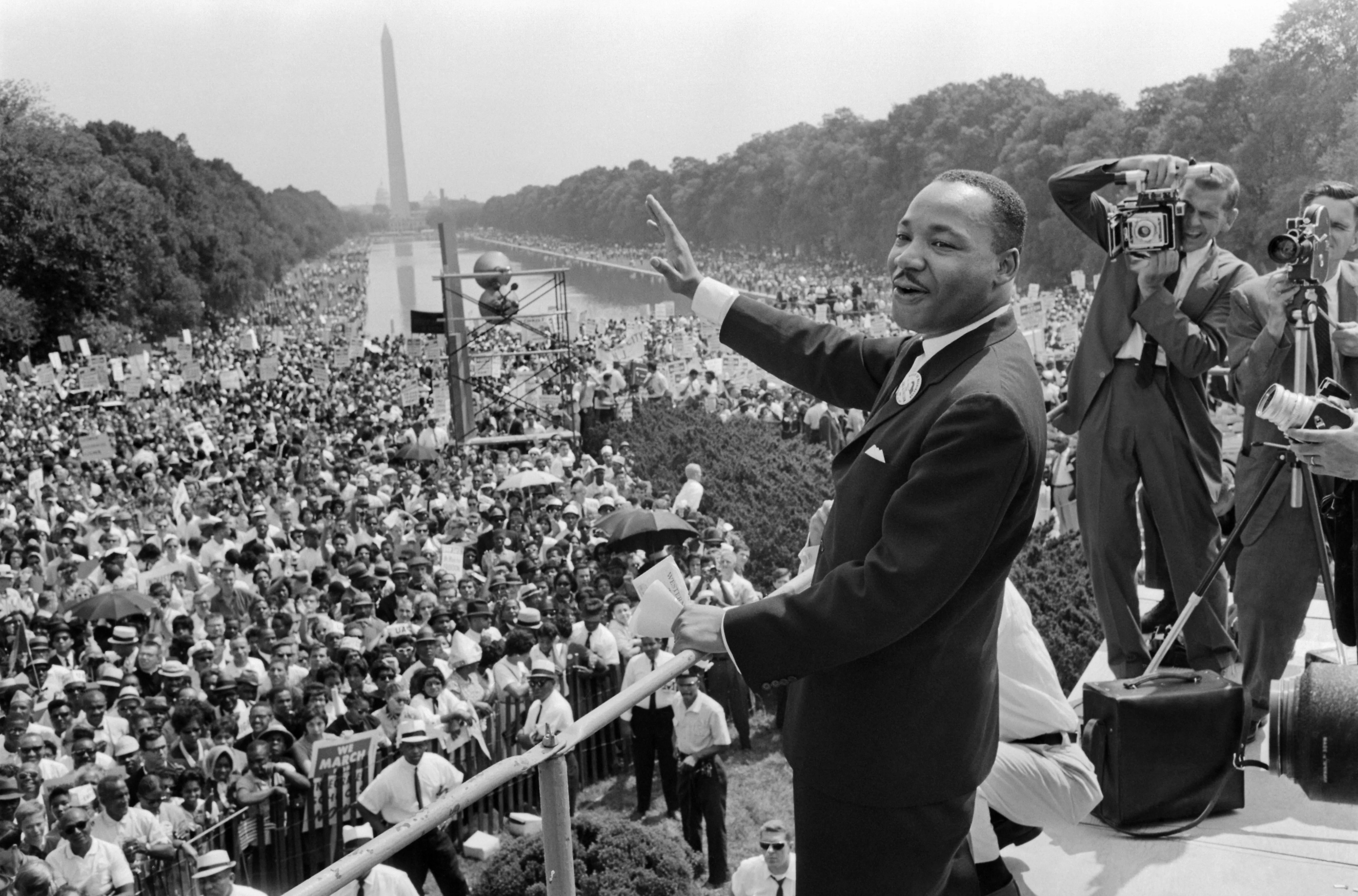
Given that the Dean scream happened on Martin Luther King Jr. Day, it was also named "I Have a Scream", referencing the name of King's speech "I Have a Dream."

National network and cable channels aired the clip 633 times within four days and 937 times in one week, and the media named it the "Dean scream" and "I Have a Scream", given that the speech was presented on Martin Luther King Jr. Day. In addition to the decreased background noise, the network playings of the scream also rejected shots of the crowd screaming, the main reason Dean was being loud.

The scream became popular among netizens and generated multiple parodies. The "Dean scream" is considered the first political meme to have become viral online. Fan remixes of songs such as Lil Jon's "Throw It Up" and Ozzy Osbourne's "Crazy Train" that used it were published online, and it was referenced in the JibJab skit "This Land!", one of the website's earlier videos. A student published on his college magazine's website a remix called "Dean Goes Nuts", which became so popular that within days the site went offline because of bandwidth limits. Season 1, episode 6 of the 2008 show Breaking Bad, titled "Crazy Handful of Nothin'", features the scream subtly dubbed into a scene of an explosion blowing out a building's windows.

In terms of exposure on talk shows, Jay Leno responded, "Did you see Dean's speech last night? Oh my God! Now I hear the cows in Iowa are afraid of getting mad Dean disease. It's always a bad sign when at the end of your speech, your aide is shooting you with a tranquilizer gun;" and David Letterman joked, "Here's what happened: The people of Iowa realized they didn't want a president with the personality of a hockey dad." Dennis Miller, on his show, also used a buzzer named the "Dean scream button" that played the scream when pressed.

== Impact on Dean's campaign ==
Dean and the campaign staff were upset and concerned about the scream's media exposure and its possible negative impacts on the campaign; Albright-Hanna recalled a CNN reporter of Dean's campaign stating that one of Dean's staffers wanted to walk into the network headquarters and set himself on fire with gasoline. In order to keep polling numbers high before the start of the New Hampshire primary, Dean made appearances on shows such as ABC Primetime and Late Show with David Letterman. He made light of the scream, jokingly referring to his Iowa speech as a "crazy, red-faced rant" in his interview with David Letterman. Dean's campaign sent DVDs and VHS tapes of his latest TV appearances to 3,000 New Hampshire residents. This tactic did not work; Dean lost the primaries of New Hampshire and other states to the point where he suspended his campaign after coming in a distant third in the Wisconsin primary in February 2004.

Despite retrospective pieces about the Dean scream summarizing it as a political gaffe that doomed Dean's campaign, this has been contested not only by political experts and journalists but also Dean and his campaign staff. While they admitted the scream was used by the Washington establishment and news media corporations to dismiss Dean's increasingly voguish campaign because "they didn't fundamentally understand" it, they blamed the loss on a lack of structure, poor media training and a risky strategy entirely focused on winning Iowa. Trippi suggested that even if Dean acted more controlled at the rally, "I'm not sure it would've mattered." Graff also suggested the scream "sucked up all the oxygen" out of John Edwards' polling numbers in the Iowa caucus, causing him to lose.

Christine Pelosi stated Dean had been doomed to fail after his third-place result in Iowa. Pacific Standard analyzed a lack of insider support (a strong factor in a candidate's chance of becoming a presidential nominee) already ruining his prospects beforehand, as his public attacks towards Republicans and Democrats who supported the Iraq War already turned off any desire from insiders to endorse him. Historian David Eisenbach said that although the scream contributed to Dean's loss, it would not have done so without the media's previous "crazy-person" portrayal of Dean. Media scholar Robert Thompson suggested that the scream would have worked for Dean far better if he campaigned in 2016.

Although Dean supporters argued he was not aware of how the microphone's sensitivity gave a false impression of his tone, Salzman and political scientist Samuel L. Popkin held Dean accountable for not understanding the system of presidential races; Popkin states he only spoke to those in the room and not to a nationwide television audience that was previously unaware of him, and Salzman reasoned any bad moment of a candidate's speech would have been significantly covered regardless of "how good 99 percent of your speech was."

== Later years ==
On July 27, 2005, New York governor George Pataki imitated the Dean scream at The Water Club when listing states he would campaign in if he ran for president. Dean himself reenacted the scream on May 14, 2015, at the New Jersey Democratic State Committee, listing states that Governor Chris Christie would not win if he ran for president. Dean paraphrased the ending to his scream speech at the 2016 Democratic National Convention.

NBC News, in 2019, reported that "even years later, people turned the 'scream' into dance remixes, YouTube performances and famous comedy skits." Dean said in an interview, "I look back on it with some amusement. I get asked for autographs for it all the time."
