= Danny Sebright =

Danny E. Sebright
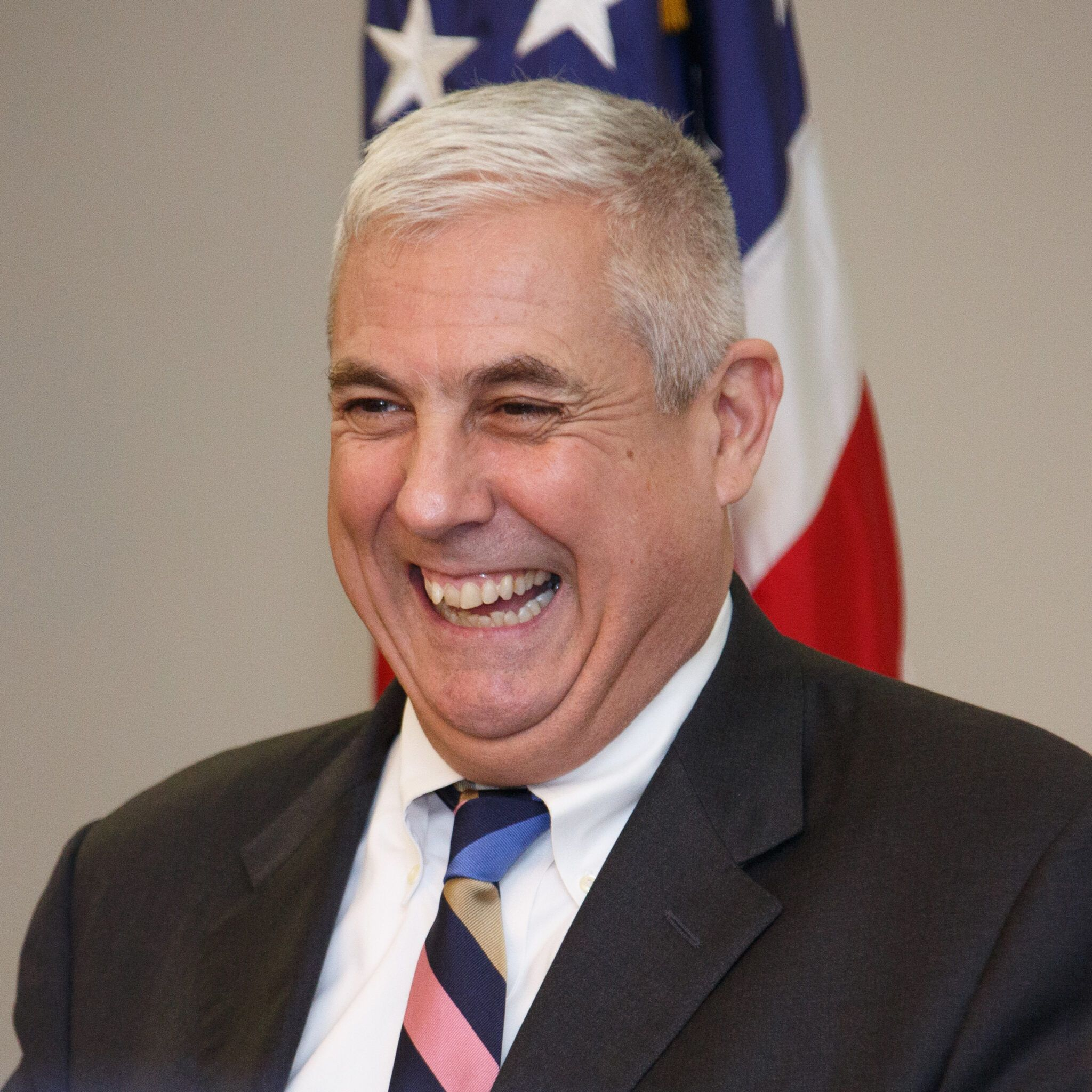
- Born: February 27, 1961 (age 65); East Berlin, Pennsylvania, United States
- Education: George Washington University, Harvard University
- Occupation: National security professional
- Known for: President, U.S.-U.A.E. Business Council

Danny Edward Sebright (born February 27, 1961) is an American national security professional who is the president of the U.S.-U.A.E. Business Council, a Washington, D.C.–based business advocacy organization committed to fostering stronger trade and commercial ties between the United States and the United Arab Emirates.

Sebright served at the Department of Defense and the Defense Intelligence Agency for nearly 20 years, most recently as a Policy Director in the Office of the Secretary of Defense until 2002. Sebright has served on a number of political campaigns, most notably as Governor Howard Dean’s foreign policy advisor during his campaign for president. He worked as a senior advisor in the Middle East practice group at The Cohen Group from 2002 to 2018.

== Education ==
Sebright attended university in Washington, D.C., where he obtained a degree in international affairs from George Washington University's Elliott School of International Affairs in 1984. From 2000 to 2001, Sebright completed the mid-career master's program at Harvard University’s John F. Kennedy School of Government, obtaining a Master's degree in Public Administration in 2001.

== Career ==
=== Defense Intelligence Agency ===
Sebright joined the Defense Intelligence Agency as an intelligence officer immediately upon graduation from university, where he worked for the next ten years, eventually holding a senior rank in the Joint Chiefs of Staff and National Joint Military Intelligence Collection Center. In his time at DIA, he served overseas in the Middle East, Asia, and Africa. He was honored with the Director of Central Intelligence’s Exceptional Analyst Award in 1990, the DIA Civilian Service Award for Operation Desert Shield/Storm in 1991, and the Exceptional Civilian Service Award for diplomatic achievements in Israel in 1992.

=== Department of Defense ===
Following his time at DIA, Sebright transitioned into a director role at Office of the Under Secretary of Defense for Policy, first as Country Director for Israel working under the Assistant Secretary of Defense for International Security Affairs, and later serving as director, Executive Secretariat for the global war on terrorism for the Under Secretary of Policy from 2001 to 2002. During his tenure, Sebright cultivated extensive contacts with U.S. and foreign defense industry officials to coordinate and implement DoD weapons sales to Israel and elsewhere in the Middle East. Simultaneously, he served as a spokesperson on U.S. defense relations with Israel to a wide variety of public groups. Sebright also served as a DoD representative to many of the peace talks brokered by the U.S. between Israel and its Arab neighbors. In 1999 he was the recipient of the Paul H. Nitze Award for Excellence in International Security Policy.

As Director of the Executive Secretariat from 2001 to 2002, Sebright lead a team of policy professionals responsible for initiating, tasking, and tracking Department of Defense and U.S. military actions related to fighting the global war on terrorism, including Operation Enduring Freedom in Afghanistan and Operation Noble Eagle, the defense of the U.S. homeland. As the Bush Administration began early preparations in 2002 to fight a war in Iraq, Sebright retired from his nearly 20-year career of government service.

=== The Cohen Group ===
In 2002, Sebright entered the private sector to work for former U.S. Secretary of Defense William S. Cohen at The Cohen Group, a global strategic consulting firm operating at the intersection of public policy, government, and the private sector. He worked as a senior advisor in the Middle East practice group from 2002 until 2018.

=== U.S.-U.A.E. Business Council ===
In 2008, Sebright was appointed to serve as the president of the newly created U.S.-U.A.E. Business Council, a bilateral trade and advocacy organization that works to foster stronger trade and commercial relations between the U.S. and the U.A.E. Sebright has been instrumental in helping secure the U.S.-U.A.E. 123 Agreement for civilian nuclear energy cooperation in 2009. He has worked to build closer business alliances for U.A.E. investment in the U.S. in projects like GlobalFoundries in Saratoga, New York. He has been at the forefront of efforts to approve landmark U.S. weapons sales and commercial aircraft deals by U.S. companies with the U.A.E. Sebright has been active in Expo 2020 Dubai, helping bring American, Emirati, and international businesses from around the world to the USA Pavilion.

== Personal life ==
Danny Sebright hails from East Berlin, Pennsylvania, where he grew up on a multi-generational dairy farm. After graduating from high school in 1979, Sebright attended the George Washington University’s Elliott School of International Affairs graduating in 1984. He then completed his master's in public policy at Harvard’s Kennedy School of Government graduating in 2001.

Sebright is an active member of the International Institute for Strategic Studies (IISS), and is on the board of the Eisenhower National Advisory Committee at Gettysburg College where he also teaches a seminar on the Middle East within the Eisenhower Institute.

Sebright is a member of the board of the Adams County Foundation, as he believes that giving back to the local community is one of the most important and rewarding aspects of life.

When not in the U.A.E. or Washington, D.C; Sebright splits his time between Gettysburg, Pennsylvania, and Rehoboth Beach, Delaware.
