= Dean and Me =

- Directed by: Heath Eiden
- Produced by: Iris Cahn; Deanna Kamiel
- Starring: Howard Dean
- Release date: 2008
- Running time: 88 minutes
- Country: United States
- Language: English

Dean and Me: Roadshow of an American Primary is a 2008 documentary film about Howard Dean and his campaign in the 2004 presidential election. Dean and Me was directed by Heath Eiden, co-produced by Eiden, Iris Cahn, and Deanna Kamiel.

The film features Dean, Al Franken, Michael Moore, Ted Kennedy, Walter Mondale, Hillary Clinton, Alexandra Pelosi, and many others.

== Background ==
Director Heath Eiden said that he conceived of the project after watching the artist who painted Dean's gubernatorial portrait, which depicted the then-governor sitting in a canoe. The film was later renamed Dean and Me: Lessons From an American Primary.

== Distribution ==
The film has been shown at several film festivals, including the Vermont International Film Festival, the Hartford International Film Festival, the SNOB (Somewhere North of Boston) Film Festival, the film's world premiere was at the Minneapolis-St. Paul International Film Festival.

== Legacy ==
During the 2016 Democratic presidential primary, when fellow Vermonter Bernie Sanders was a candidate, Eiden revisited Dean and Me and said that the film shows that "Bernie Sanders and team, win or lose, learned from Dean's movement that giving up is not an option and ideas never die while some campaigns do.".
