= 2004 Iowa Democratic presidential caucuses =

- January 19, 2004

45 pledged delegates to the 2004 Democratic National Convention
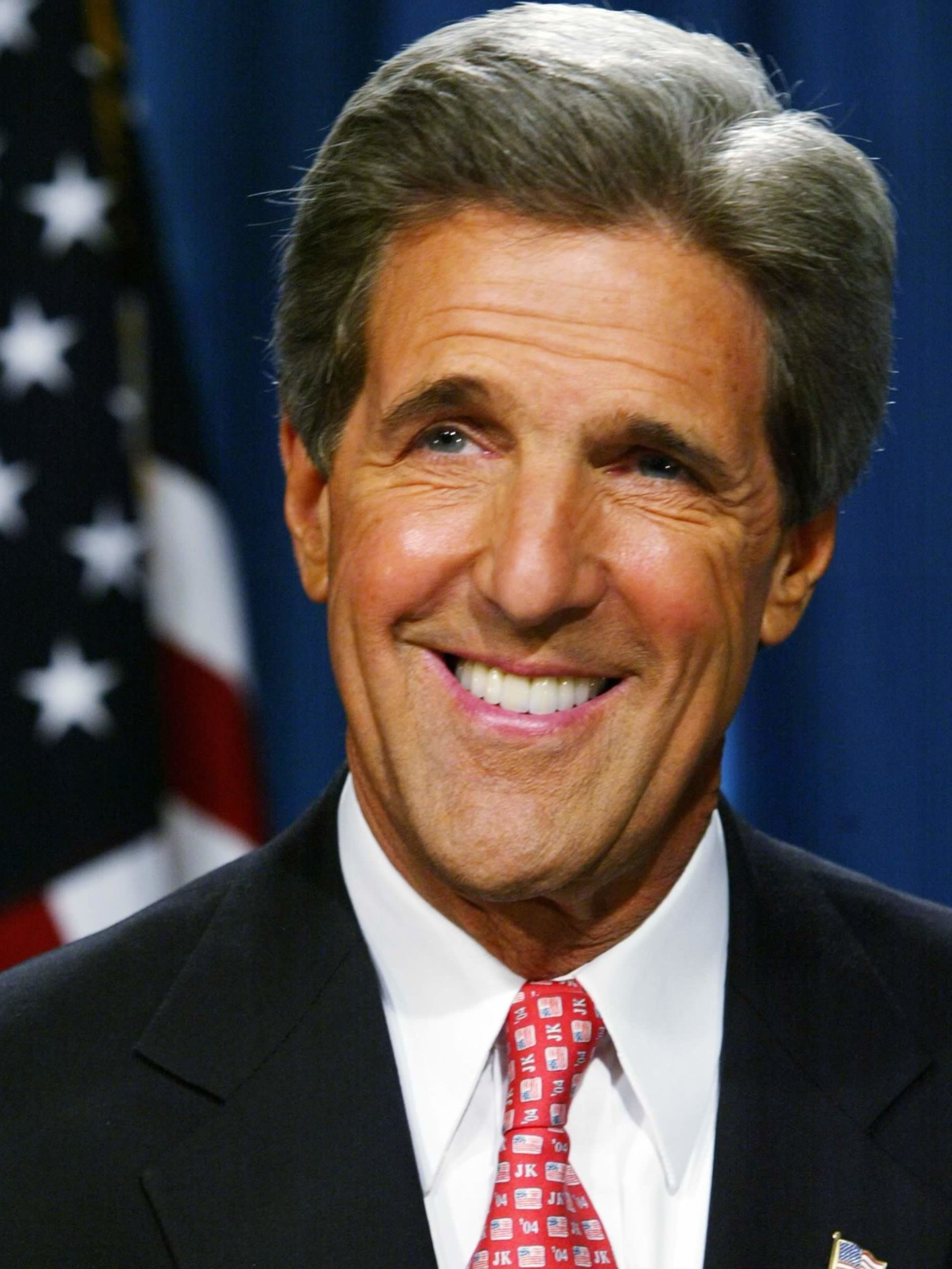

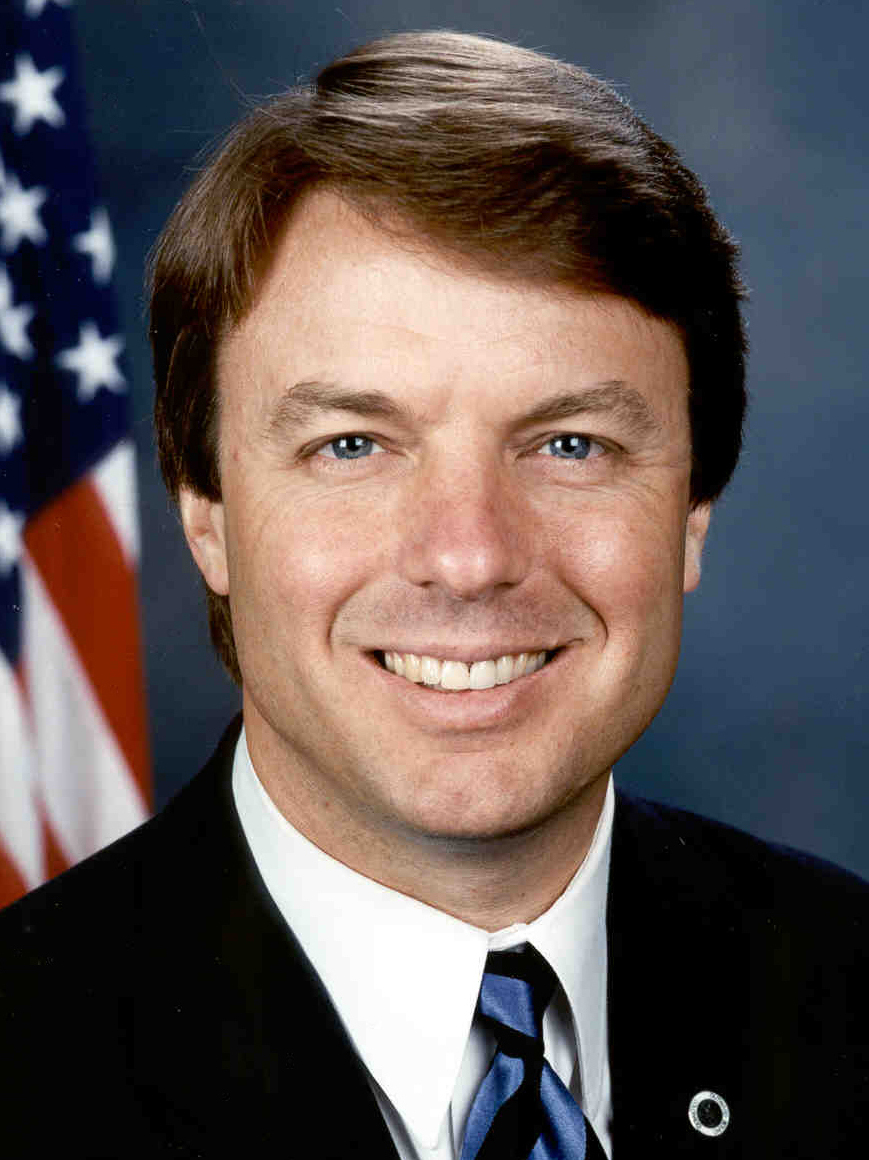

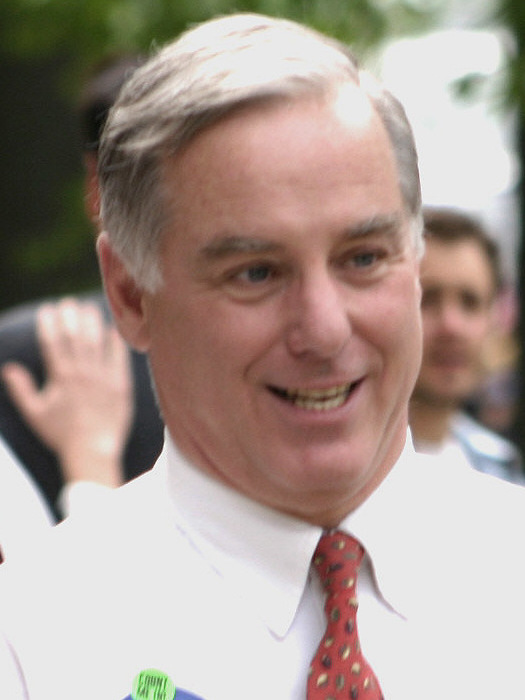

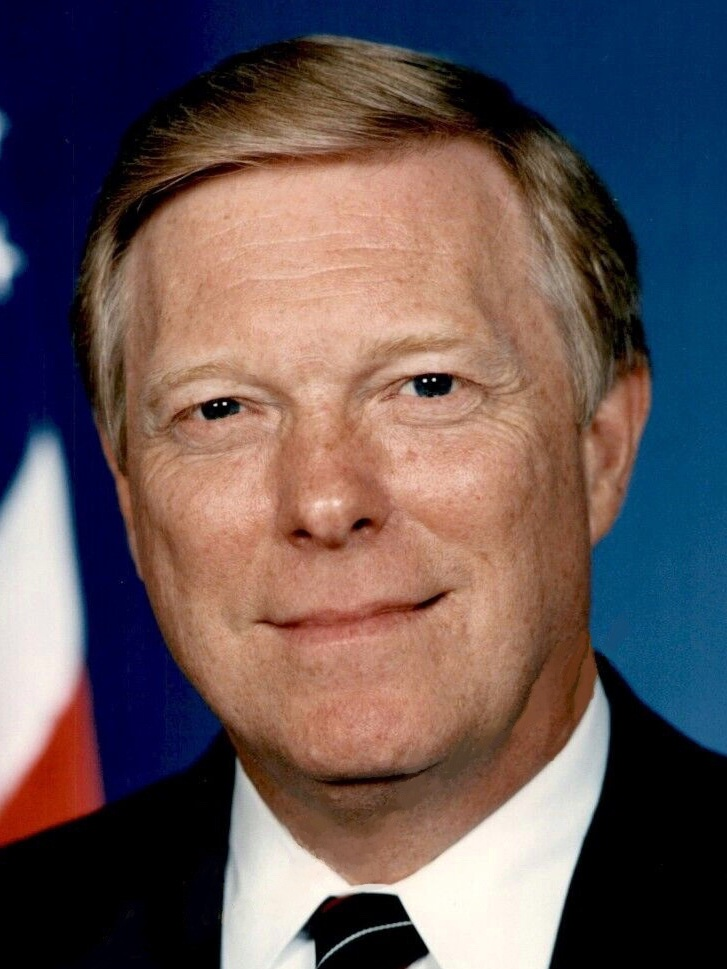
Candidate	John Kerry	John Edwards
Home state	Massachusetts	North Carolina
Delegate count	20	18
SDEs	1,128	954
Percentage (of SDEs)	37.6%	31.8%
Candidate	Howard Dean	Dick Gephardt
Home state	Vermont	Missouri
Delegate count	7	0
SDEs	540	318
Percentage (of SDEs)	18.0%	10.6%
- Caucus results by county Kerry: 30–40% 40–50% 50–60% Edwards: 20–30% 30–40% 40–50% 50–60% Dean: 30–40% 40–50% Tie

The 2004 Iowa Democratic presidential caucuses were an election held on January 19 as part of the United States presidential primary. They were the first major test of some of the leading contenders for the Democratic Party's nomination as its candidate for the 2004 United States presidential election.

== Candidates ==
- Howard Dean, former governor of Vermont
- John Edwards, U.S. senator from North Carolina
- Dick Gephardt, U.S. representative from Missouri
- John Kerry, U.S. senator from Massachusetts
- Dennis Kucinich, U.S. representative from Ohio

== Campaign ==
The first contenders for the nomination arrived in Iowa almost two years before the caucuses were held. The first to arrive were Dick Gephardt and Howard Dean, who began to make occasional speeches there and started to build an organization. In 2003, John Kerry, John Edwards, Carol Moseley Braun, and Dennis Kucinich all began to campaign heavily in the state.

Gephardt went into the campaign with high expectations. He was from a neighboring state, Missouri, had strong union backing, and he had won the state in 1988. During 2003, however, Howard Dean began to grow in popularity across the country on a strong anti-war message that appealed to the party base. Gephardt continued to do well, but Kerry and Edwards both sank to single-digit levels of support. Kucinich and Moseley Braun were never considered strong contenders and polled poorly throughout the campaign.

Three of the Democratic candidates sat out the caucuses. Joe Lieberman and Al Sharpton did not believe they could get sufficient support in the state and concentrated their efforts on New Hampshire. Wesley Clark got into the race too late to be competitive in Iowa.

On January 10, Howard Dean got a major boost when Iowa's junior Senator Tom Harkin endorsed him. On January 15, Carol Moseley Braun withdrew from the race and also threw her support behind Dean.

During the last weeks of the campaign, however, the polls began to indicate a significant change in support. Dean and Gephardt had been hammering each other with negative advertisements, and both began losing support to revived Edwards and Kerry campaigns. Edwards received a major boost when he was endorsed by Iowa's largest newspaper.

Shortly before the caucus, Edwards and Kucinich reached an agreement in which they would ask their supporters to back the other camp in any precinct where they lacked the necessary numbers to qualify for delegates. The deal was widely seen as a blow to the Gephardt campaign, which had expected to pick up the compatibly pro-union Kucinich supporters in such circumstances.

== Results ==
The results were very similar to that indicated by last-minute polling but were a surprise compared with weeks earlier.

2004 Iowa Democratic presidential caucuses Results
Party	Candidate	State delegate equivalents	Percentage	National delegates
Democratic	John Kerry	1,128	37.6%	20
Democratic	John Edwards	954	31.8%	18
Democratic	Howard Dean	540	18.0%	7
Democratic	Richard Gephardt	318	10.6%	0
Democratic	Dennis Kucinich	39	1.3%	0
Democratic	Wesley Clark	3	0.1%	0
Democratic	Uncommitted	15	0.5%	—
Totals		2,997	100.00%	45
Voter turnout		%		—

Source: Des Moines Register

It was reported that 124,331 Iowans participated in the caucuses. The initial county caucuses assigned delegates for further caucuses with delegates not being bound to vote for the candidate. Actual delegates to the Democratic National Convention would be chosen later: 29 at the district caucuses on April 24, 2004 and 16 at the state convention on June 12, 2004. Besides these 45 delegates assigned through the caucus system, 10 other delegates are assigned by the state party and one is elected at large at the state convention. The successful candidate at the 2004 Democratic National Convention required approximately 2,160 delegates to win the nomination.

The results showed a similar pattern across the state. Dean failed to win the support of the college areas as he had hoped, and Gephardt was not successful in winning the union areas.

== Consequences ==
The Iowa caucuses revived the once moribund campaign of Kerry, who proceeded to the New Hampshire primary as one of the front-runners, and ultimately captured the Democratic nomination. Edwards, who had been written off even more than Kerry, used the Iowa results and the later South Carolina primary to give him another boost.

The results were a blow to Dean, who had for weeks been expected to win the caucuses. He planned afterward to move quickly to New Hampshire where he expected to do well and regain momentum. At the time, he had far more money than any other candidate and did not spend much of it in Iowa. Dean's aggressive post-caucus speech to his supporters, culminating with a hoarse scream that came to be known as the Dean scream, was widely shown and mocked on television and on the Internet, although the effect on his campaign was unclear.

The results were disastrous for Dick Gephardt. He had frequently stated that a win in Iowa was essential for his candidacy. He had been seen as the front-runner for well over a year but ended up fourth, effectively ending his campaign. He cancelled planned campaign stops in New Hampshire and dropped out of the race on January 20.

Dennis Kucinich was never expected to win much support in Iowa. His fifth-place finish did not affect his plans to continue campaigning.

== See also ==
- Opinion polling for the 2004 Democratic Party presidential primaries
- 2004 Democratic Party presidential primaries
