= Electoral history of Howard Dean =

Chairman of the Democratic National Committee

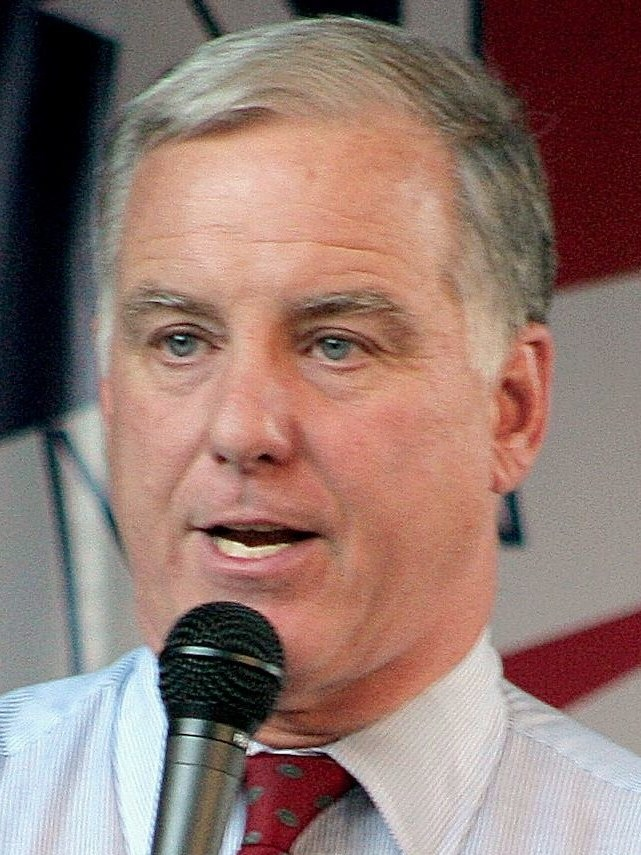
Chairman Dean at a DNC event in 2006

Howard Dean was a Governor of Vermont, candidate for President of the United States, and Chairman of the Democratic National Committee.

== Vermont elections ==
Year	Office	Incumbent	Party	Votes	Pct	Challenger	Party	Votes	Pct	3rd Party	Party	Votes	Pct
1982	VT House	Howard Dean	Democratic	596	66.4%	Timothy K. McKenzie	Citizens	300	33.4%				
1984	VT House	Howard Dean	Democratic	1092	98.9%								
1986	Lt. Gov.	Susan Auld	Republican	84,413	44.4%	Howard Dean	Democratic	99,929	52.5%				
1988	Lt. Gov.	Howard Dean	Democratic	154,660	66.5%	Pan B. Zolotas	Republican	69,731	30.0%	Lisa Steckler	Liberty Union	7,952	3.4%
1990	Lt. Gov.	Howard Dean	Democratic	120,956	58.1%	Michael Bernhardt	Republican	80,706	38.7%				
1992	Gov.	Howard Dean	Democratic	213,523	74.73%	John McClaughry	Republican	65,837	23.04%				
1994	Gov.	Howard Dean	Democratic	145,661	68.6%	David F. Kelley	Republican	40,292	19.0%	Thomas J. Morse	Independent	15,000	7.0%
1996	Gov.	Howard Dean	Democratic	179,544	70.5%	John L. Gropper	Republican	57,161	22.4%				
1998	Gov.	Howard Dean	Democratic	121,425	55.6%	Ruth Dwyer	Republican	89,726	41.1%				
2000	Gov.	Howard Dean	Democratic	148,059	50.4%	Ruth Dwyer	Republican	111,359	37.9%	Anthony Pollina	Progressive	28,116	9.5%

== United States presidential election, 2004 ==
2004 Democratic presidential primaries:

- John Kerry - 9,930,497 (60.98%)
- John Edwards - 3,162,337 (19.42%)
- Howard Dean - 903,460 (5.55%)
- Dennis Kucinich - 620,242 (3.81%)
- Wesley Clark - 547,369 (3.36%)
- Al Sharpton - 380,865 (2.34%)
- Joe Lieberman - 280,940 (1.73%)
- Uncommitted - 157,953 (0.97%)
- Lyndon LaRouche - 103,731 (0.64%)
- Carol Moseley Braun - 98,469 (0.61%)
- Dick Gephardt - 63,902 (0.39%)
