= 2004 New Hampshire Democratic presidential primary =

- January 27, 2004

27 Democratic National Convention delegates (22 pledged, 5 unpledged) The number of pledged delegates received is determined by the popular vote
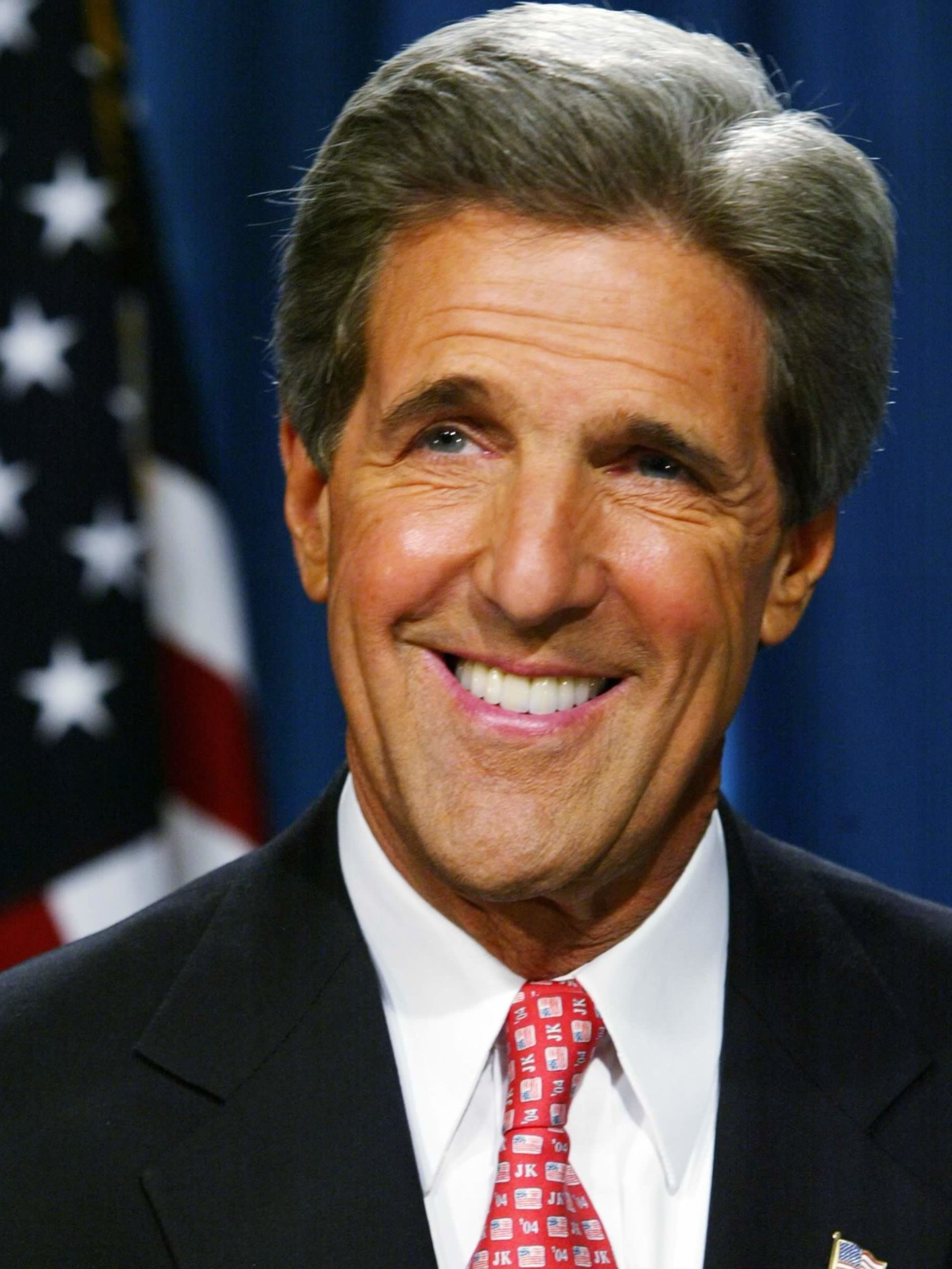

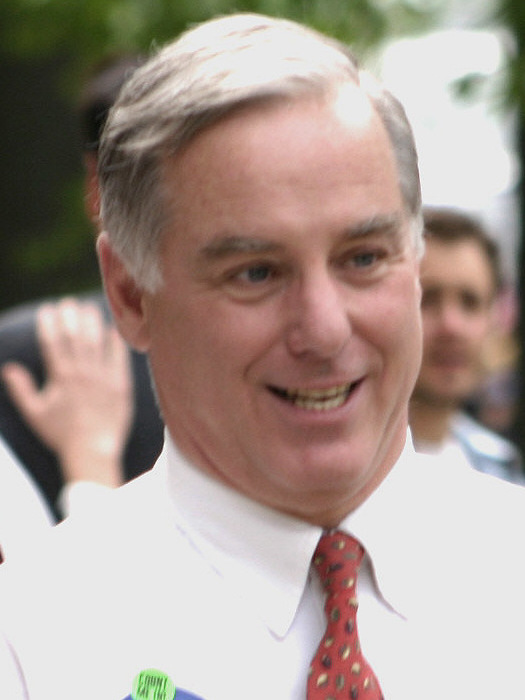

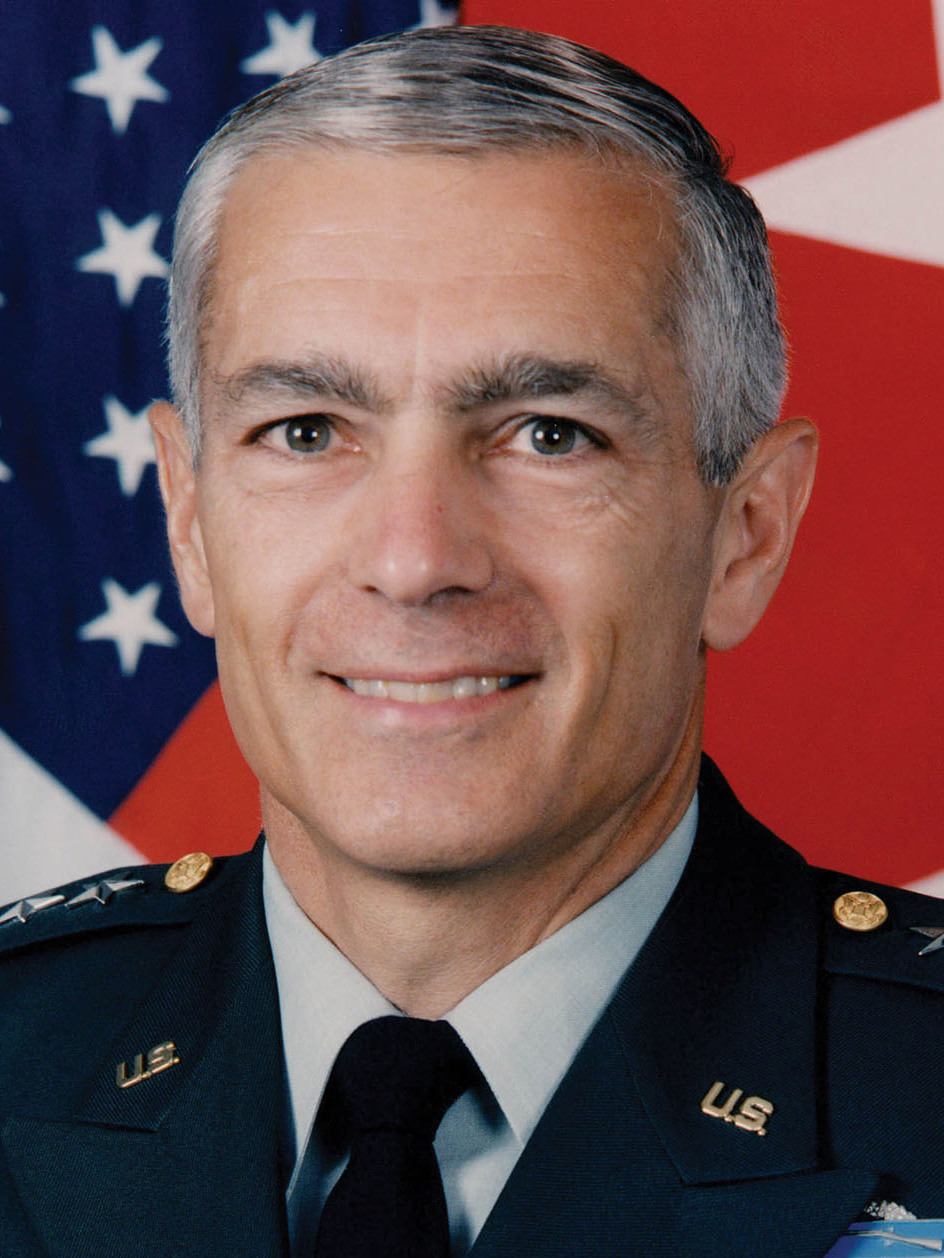

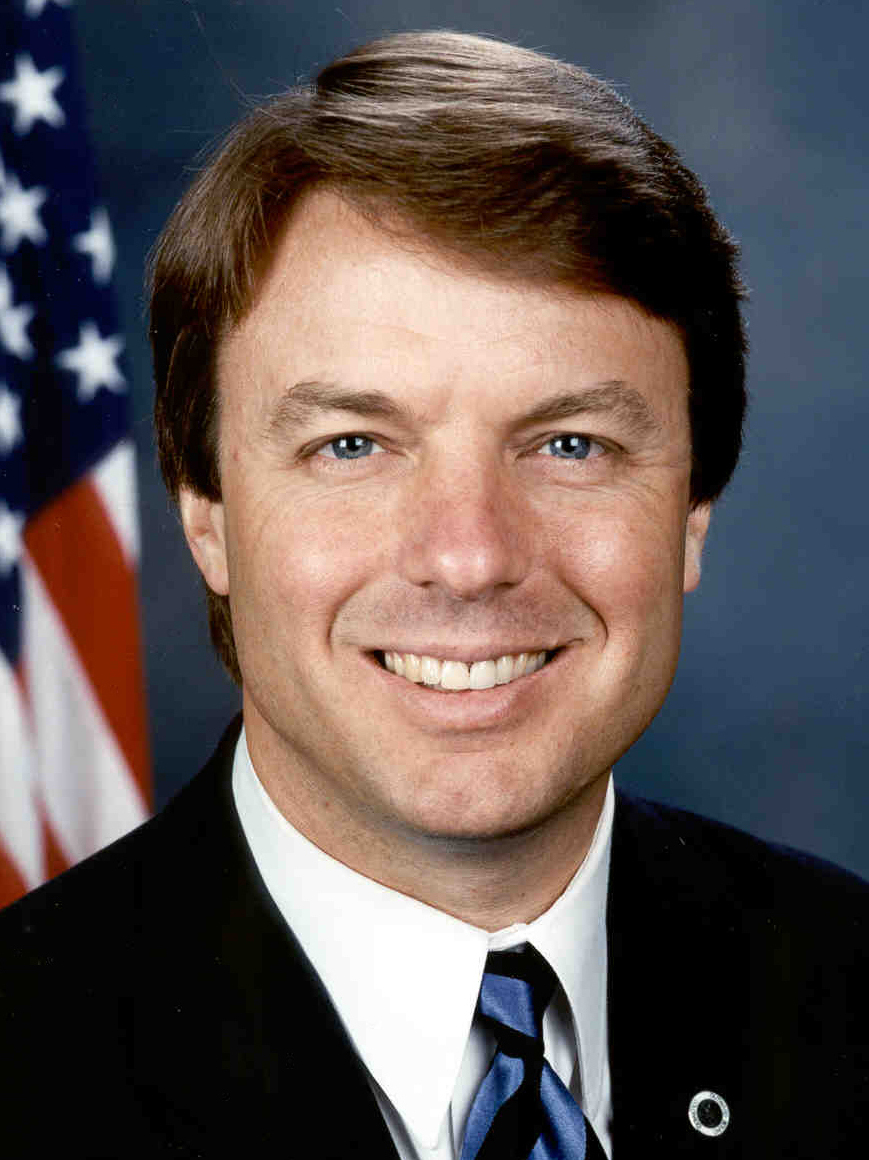

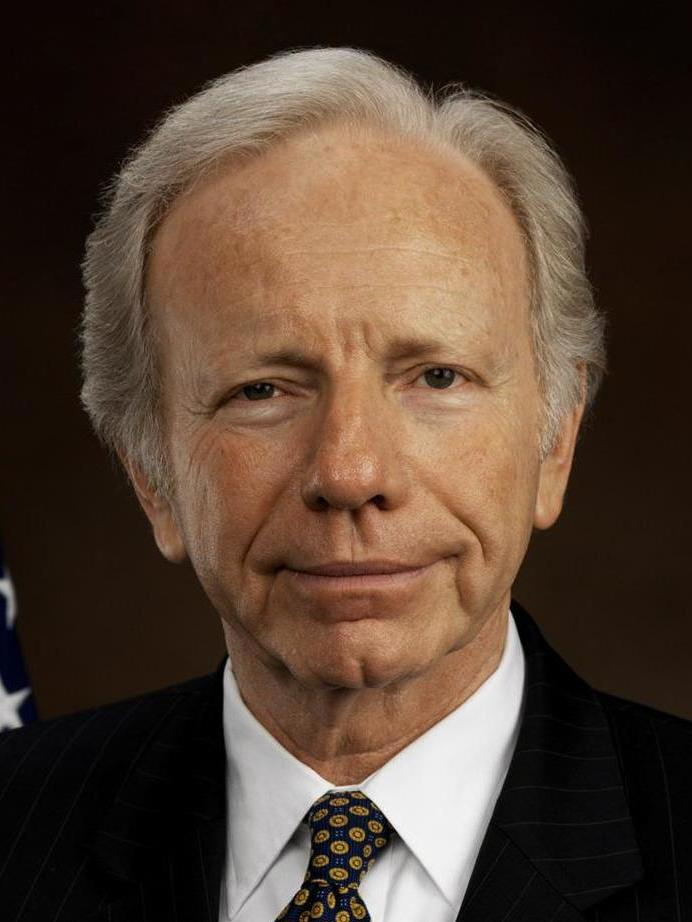

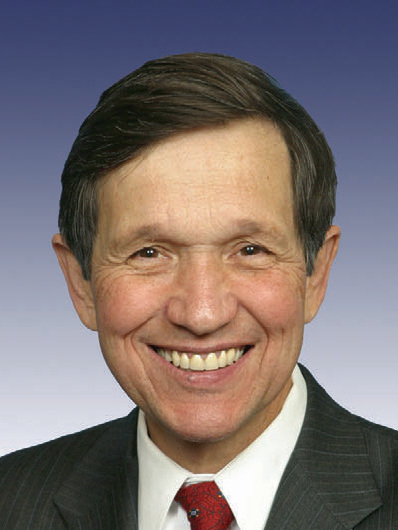
Candidate	John Kerry	Howard Dean	Wesley Clark
Home state	Massachusetts	Vermont	Arkansas
Delegate count	13	9	0
Popular vote	84,377	57,761	27,314
Percentage	38.4%	26.3%	12.4%
Candidate	John Edwards	Joe Lieberman	Dennis Kucinich
Home state	North Carolina	Connecticut	Ohio
Delegate count	0	0	0
Popular vote	26,487	18,911	3,114
Percentage	12.0%	8.6%	1.42%
- Caucus results by county Kerry: 30–40% 40–50% Dean: 30–40% 40–50% Clark: Tie: N/A

The 2004 New Hampshire Democratic presidential primary was held on January 27, 2004. Taking place eight days after the Iowa caucuses, it marked the second contest to take place during the Democratic party's 2004 primary season, as well as the first actual primary to take place.

== Polling ==
Primary polling taken by American Research Group during the last few days of campaigning (January 23 to January 27, 2004) showed that former New Hampshire poll leader as well as national leader Howard Dean was steadily gaining ground to catch up to now front-runner John Kerry.

Candidate	January 23 to 25 poll tracking	January 24 to 26 poll tracking
John Kerry	38%	35%
Howard Dean	20%	25%
John Edwards	16%	15%
Wesley Clark	15%	13%
Joe Lieberman	5%	6%

Gathered from ARG's 2004 NH Democratic Tracking Poll

Margin of Error +/- 4

Tracking polling showed that Dean had been catching up to Kerry in the days before the primary, cutting Kerry's 18 point lead to 10 points in a matter of days. With Dean dropping and Kerry rising, it became apparent that the battle for 1st place in New Hampshire would be close. Also, for third place, Wesley Clark, John Edwards and Joe Lieberman were the only ones fighting for third. With Clark and Edwards both taking hits going into the primary, and Lieberman on the rise, the fight for 1st place and third place, according to polls would be intense.

== Results ==
As results began to come in during Primary night, it became apparent Kerry had won the primary and was promptly projected the winner by several media outlets. Dean finished in second place. Clark and Edwards were in a dead-lock for third place, with both candidates at 12% during the night. Earlier returns showed Lieberman in a stronger position to tie with Clark and Edwards, allowing him to declare to his supporters that it was "a three-way split decision for third place."

As final results were being tallied, Kerry won the primary with 84,277 votes and 38%, Dean finished second, with 57,761 and 26%, and Clark narrowly defeated Edwards for third place, with 27,314 votes and 12%. Lieberman had fallen back in the count and didn't even reach 10%.

2004 New Hampshire Democratic presidential primary
Candidate	Votes	%	Delegates
John Kerry	84,377	38.35%	13
Howard Dean	57,761	26.28%	9
Wesley Clark	27,314	12.43%	
John Edwards	26,487	12.05%	
Joe Lieberman	18,911	8.60%	
Dennis Kucinich	3,114	1.42%	
Other write-ins	1,823	0.83%	
Total	219,787	100%	27

=== Exit Polling ===
Category	All	Clark	Dean	Edwards	Kerry	Lieberman
Male	46%	13%	25%	14%	36%	10%
Female	54%	12%	26%	11%	41%	8%
18-64 Years	89%	12%	25%	13%	39%	8%
65+ Years	11%	10%	28%	10%	38%	13%
Democrat	48%	11%	29%	12%	41%	5%
Republican	4%	10%	8%	9%	29%	26%
Independent	48%	13%	23%	13%	37%	12%

Gathered by CNN

Kerry won huge margins of support amongst almost all constituencies, with his only weak point amongst Republicans, who made up 4% of the voting bloc and was Lieberman's strongest point. Dean repeatedly came distant second or third for almost all categories of voters. Edwards defeated Clark amongst male voters as well as voters under 65, but only by a very tiny margin. Lieberman finished in a distant third in almost all categories except for Republicans, in which he nearly defeated John Kerry.
