= Opinion polling for the 2004 Democratic Party presidential primaries =

Various opinion polls took place ahead of the 2004 Democratic Party presidential primaries.

== Iowa ==
Candidate	6 December 2002	29 January 2003	20 June 2003	26 July 2003	22 September 2003	23 September 2003	1 October 2003	8 October 2003	21 October 2003	18 November 2003	2 December 2003	6 January 2004	7 January 2004	13 January 2004	15 January 2004
John Kerry	18%	24%	15%	14%	20%	13%	17%	16%	9%	15%	9%	15%	18%	21%	26%
Wesley Clark	-	-	-	-	7%	6%	7%	6%	7%	3%	4%	2%	4%	2%	2%
Howard Dean	1%	8%	15%	23%	21%	17%	23%	26%	21%	29%	26%	23%	30%	22%	20%
John Edwards	4%	9%	5%	5%	10%	7%	6%	8%	7%	8%	5%	9%	11%	18%	23%
Joe Lieberman	16%	13%	11%	10%	6%	4%	3%	2%	5%	1%	2%	1%	2%	1%	1%
Dick Gephardt	26%	23%	25%	21%	18%	24%	20%	27%	22%	21%	22%	18%	23%	18%	18%
Dennis Kucinich	-	-	3%	4%	1%	2%	2%	2%	1%	2%	2%	4%	3%	5%	3%
Al Sharpton	-	2%	-	-	-	1%	-	-	-	-	-	1%	-	-	1%
Carol Moseley Braun	-	-	1%	1%	1%	1%	-	2%	1%	-	1%	2%	-	-	1%

Source: Arizona - 2004 Presidential Polls

== New Hampshire ==
Primary polling taken by American Research Group during the last few days of campaigning ( January 23 to January 27, 2004 ) showed that former New Hampshire poll leader as well as national leader Howard Dean was steadily gaining ground on Kerry.

Candidate	January 23 to 25 poll tracking	January 24 to 26 poll tracking
John Kerry	38%	35%
Howard Dean	20%	25%
John Edwards	16%	15%
Wesley Clark	15%	13%
Joe Lieberman	5%	6%

Gathered from ARG's 2004 NH Democratic Tracking Poll

Margin of Error +/- 4

Tracking polling showed that Dean had been catching up to Kerry in the days before the primary, cutting Kerry's 18 point lead to 10 points in a matter of days. With Dean dropping and Kerry rising, it became apparent that the battle for 1st place in New Hampshire would be close. Also, for third place, Wesley Clark, John Edwards and Joe Lieberman were the only ones fighting for third. With Clark and Edwards both taking hits going into the primary, a Lieberman on the rise, the fight for 1st place and third place, according to polls would be intense.

== Missouri ==
Candidate	22 January 2004	29 January 2004	29 January 2004	1 February 2004
John Kerry	25%	37%	44%	56%
John Edwards	9%	11%	14%	17%
Howard Dean	6%	7%	9%	9%
Wesley Clark	3%	6%	5%	6%
Al Sharpton	1%	2%	2%	4%
Joe Lieberman	2%	6%	5%	3%
Dennis Kucinich	1%	-	1%	-
Dick Gephardt	3%	-	1%	-

Source: Missouri - 2004 Presidential Polls

== Delaware ==
Candidate	29 January 2004
John Kerry	27%
Joe Lieberman	16%
Howard Dean	14%
John Edwards	9%
Wesley Clark	8%
Dennis Kucinich	1%
Al Sharpton	1%

Source: Delaware - 2004 Presidential Polls

== Arizona ==
Candidate	22 December 2003	9 January 2004	24 January 2004	29 January 2004	1 February 2004
John Kerry	6%	3%	24%	29%	42%
Wesley Clark	15%	34%	21%	22%	28%
Howard Dean	26%	27%	10%	13%	15%
John Edwards	1%	3%	15%	8%	7%
Joe Lieberman	9%	6%	7%	3%	6%
Dick Gephardt	-	6%	-	-	-
Dennis Kucinich	1%	-	-	2%	1%
Al Sharpton	-	-	-	1%	-
Carol Moseley Braun	-	1%	-	-	-

Source: Arizona - 2004 Presidential Polls
