= 2004 Tennessee Democratic presidential primary =

- February 10, 2004

85 Democratic National Convention delegates (69 pledged, 16 unpledged) The number of pledged delegates received is determined by the popular vote
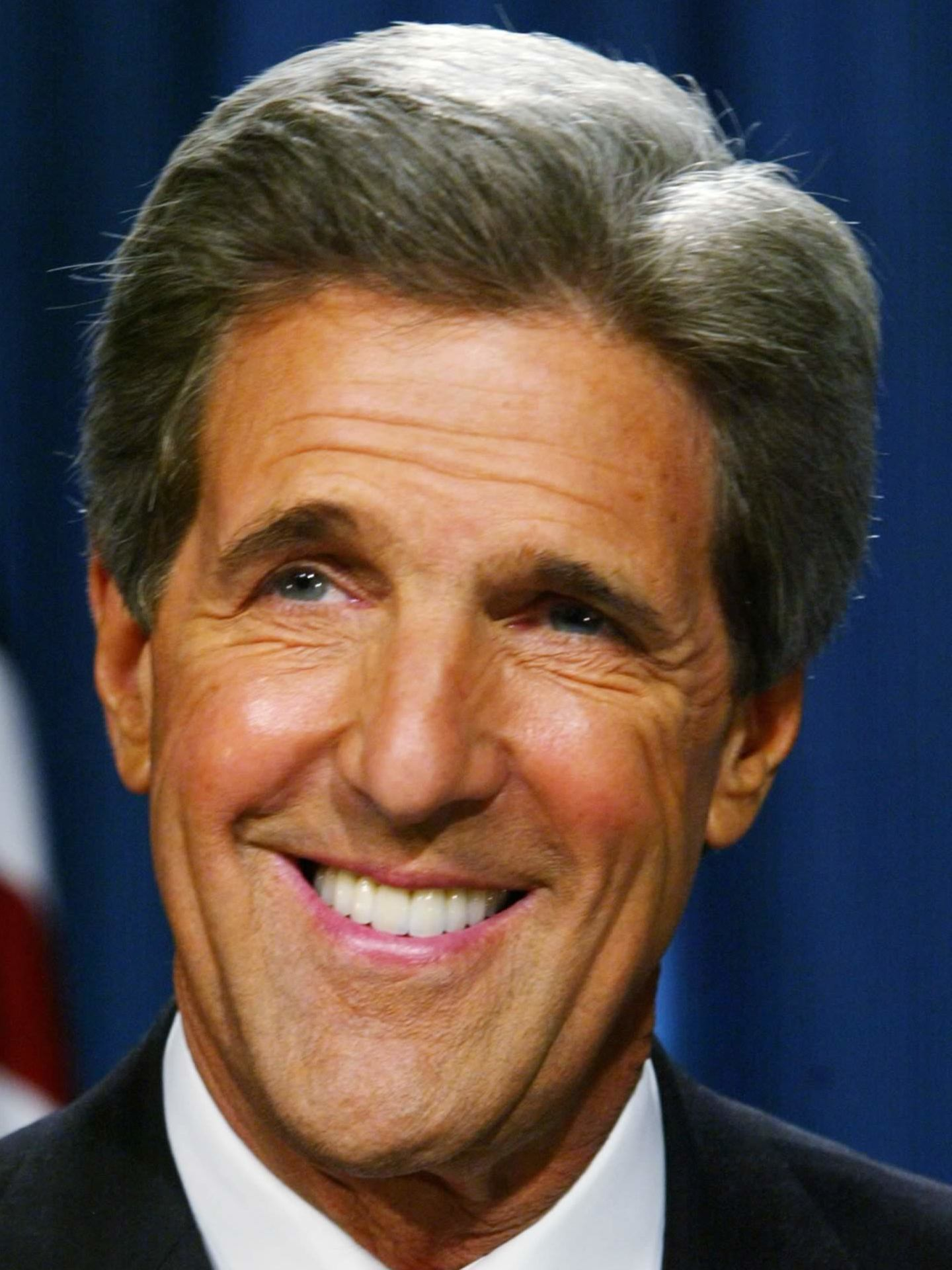

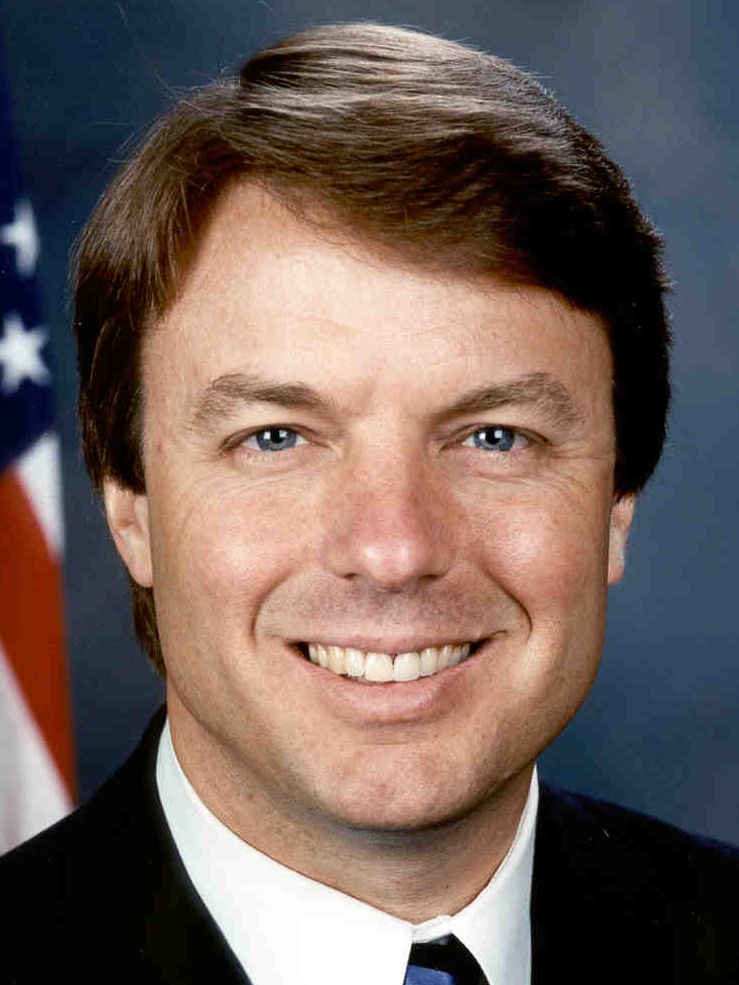

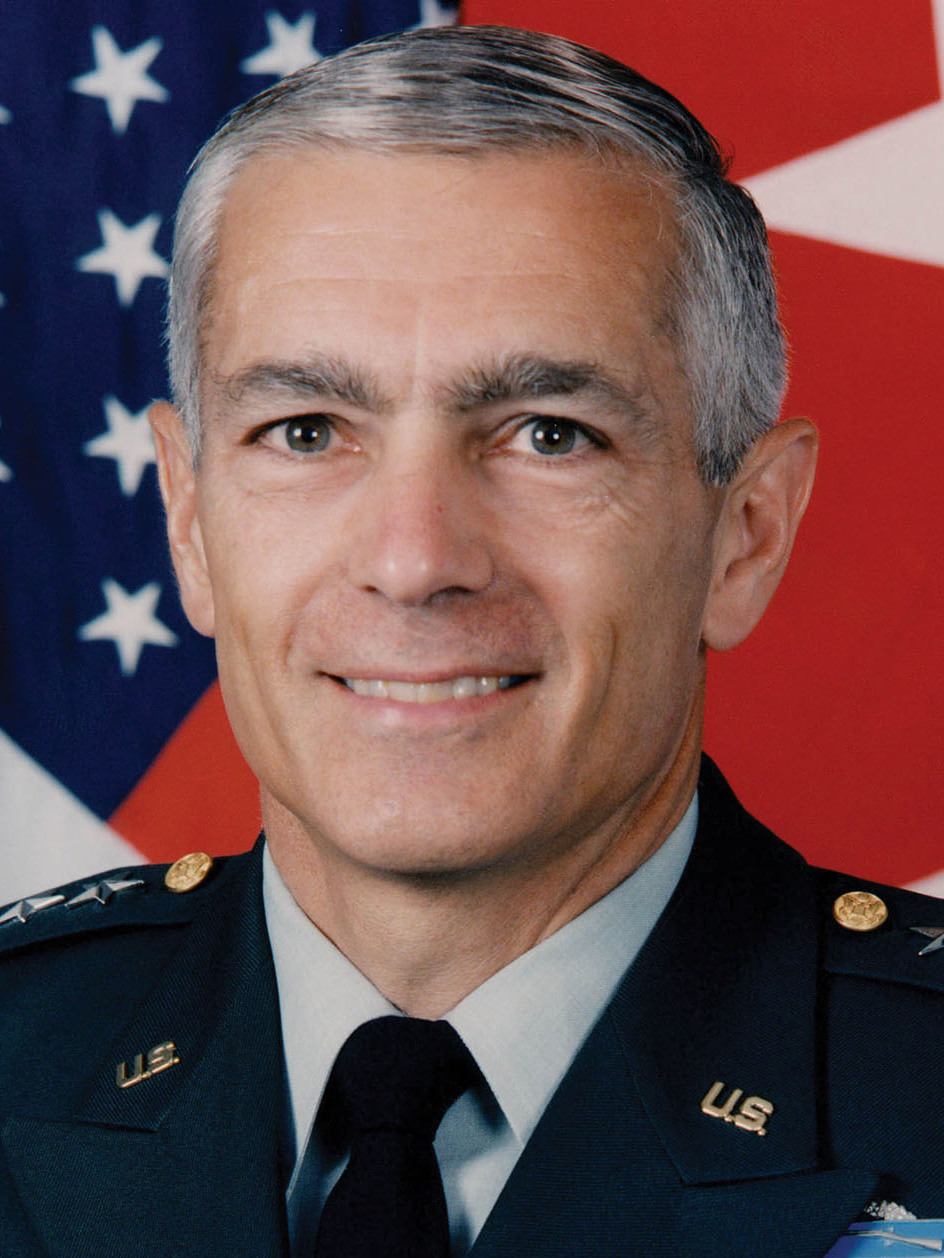
Candidate	John Kerry	John Edwards
Home state	Massachusetts	North Carolina
Delegate count	31	20
Popular vote	151,527	97,914
Percentage	41.02%	26.51%
Candidate	Wesley Clark
Home state	Arkansas
Delegate count	18
Popular vote	85,315
Percentage	23.10%
- County results Kerry 30–40% 40–50% 50–60% Edwards 30–40%

The 2004 Tennessee Democratic presidential primary was held on February 10 in the U.S. state of Tennessee as one of the Democratic Party's statewide nomination contests ahead of the 2004 presidential election. The primary determined 69 delegates to the 2004 Democratic National Convention, who were awarded on a proportional basis. John Kerry won with 41.02% of the vote and was awarded 31 delegates.

== Results ==
Tennessee Democratic Presidential Primary Results – 2004
Party	Candidate	Votes	Percentage	Delegates
Democratic	John Kerry	151,527	41.02%	31
Democratic	John Edwards	97,914	26.51%	20
Democratic	Wesley Clark	85,315	23.10%	18
Democratic	Howard Dean (withdrawn)	16,128	4.37%	0
Democratic	Al Sharpton	6,107	1.65%	0
Democratic	Joe Lieberman	3,213	0.87%	0
Democratic	Uncommitted	2,727	0.74%	0
Democratic	Carol Moseley Braun (withdrawn)	2,490	0.67%	0
Democratic	Dennis Kucinich	2,279	0.62%	0
Democratic	Dick Gephardt (withdrawn)	1,402	0.38%	0
Democratic	Lyndon LaRouche	283	0.08%	0
Totals		626,738	100.00%	69

== See also ==
- 2004 Tennessee Republican presidential primary
- 2004 Democratic Party presidential primaries
- 2004 United States presidential election in Tennessee
- 2004 Tennessee elections
