= 2004 Tennessee Republican presidential primary =

- February 10, 2004

52 pledged delegates to the; 2004 Republican National Convention

Candidate	George W. Bush	Uncommitted
Home state	Texas	n/a
Delegate count	52	0
Popular vote	94,557	4,504
Percentage	95.45%	4.55%
- County results Bush: 85% 90% 95%

The 2004 Tennessee Republican presidential primary was held on February 10, 2004, along with primaries in Arkansas and Oregon. Voters chose the state's 52 pledged delegates to the 2004 Republican National Convention.

Incumbent president George W. Bush won the primary and all of the state's delegates.

== Procedure ==
Tennessee was allocated 55 delegates to the Republican National Convention: 52 were allocated based on the results of the primary, with the other three being unpledged superdelegates.

12 delegates were assigned statewide while 27 were assigned to the state's nine congressional districts, with three delegates per district. The delegate allocation rules for both statewide and district delegates were the same. A candidate would win all the delegates if they won a majority of the vote, but if the candidate with the most votes won less than 50%, the delegates were awarded proportionally based on the popular vote with a 20% threshold to qualify for delegates.

== Results ==
2004 Tennessee Republican presidential primary
Candidate	Votes	%	Delegates
George W. Bush (incumbent)	94,557	95.45%	52
Write-ins	4,504	4.55%	
Total	99,061	100%	52

=== Results by county ===
2004 Tennessee Republican presidential primary (results by county)
County	George W. Bush		Uncommitted		Total votes cast
County	Votes	%	Votes	%	Total votes cast
Anderson	601	96.47%	22	3.53%	623
Bedford	189	98.95%	2	1.05%	191
Benton	205	92.76%	16	7.24%	221
Bledsoe	179	94.71%	10	5.29%	189
Blount	1,950	96.01%	81	3.99%	2,031
Bradley	1,188	97.62%	29	2.38%	1,217
Campbell	337	96.84%	11	3.16%	348
Cannon	101	99.02%	1	0.98%	102
Carroll	274	95.47%	13	4.53%	287
Carter	3,725	92.48%	303	7.52%	4,028
Cheatham	484	95.46%	23	4.54%	507
Chester	144	99.31%	1	0.69%	145
Claiborne	235	97.51%	6	2.49%	241
Clay	41	100%	0	0%	41
Cocke	2,197	94.86%	119	5.14%	2,316
Coffee	619	97.48%	16	2.52%	635
Crockett	55	98.21%	1	1.79%	56
Cumberland	1,417	98.40%	23	1.60%	1,440
Davidson	5,308	96.21%	209	3.79%	5,517
Decatur	99	93.40%	7	6.60%	106
Dekalb	93	94.90%	5	5.10%	98
Dickson	404	96.88%	13	3.12%	417
Dyer	336	97.67%	8	2.33%	344
Fayette	280	97.90%	6	2.10%	286
Fentress	157	99.37%	1	0.63%	158
Franklin	306	98.39%	5	1.61%	311
Gibson	320	97.86%	7	2.14%	327
Giles	180	96.26%	7	3.74%	187
Grainger	905	96.69%	31	3.31%	936
Greene	4,028	92.70%	317	7.30%	4,345
Grundy	95	96.94%	3	3.06%	98
Hamblen	2,270	94.23%	139	5.77%	2,409
Hamilton	6,646	96.46%	244	3.54%	6,890
Hancock	562	92.28%	47	7.72%	609
Hardeman	127	95.49%	6	4.51%	133
Hardin	280	97.22%	8	2.78%	288
Hawkins	1,688	95.21%	85	4.79%	1,773
Haywood	79	95.18%	4	4.82%	83
Henderson	1,146	89.88%	129	10.12%	1,275
Henry	181	97.31%	5	2.69%	186
Hickman	165	95.93%	7	4.07%	172
Houston	77	96.25%	3	3.75%	80
Humphreys	149	98.03%	3	1.97%	152
Jackson	92	93.88%	6	6.12%	98
Jefferson	1,292	95.35%	63	4.65%	1,355
Johnson	268	92.41%	22	7.59%	290
Knox	9,885	95.62%	453	4.38%	10,338
Lake	37	100%	0	0%	37
Lauderdale	177	97.79%	4	2.21%	181
Lawrence	197	93.81%	13	6.19%	210
Lewis	75	91.46%	7	8.54%	82
Lincoln	327	98.20%	6	1.80%	333
Loudon	579	97.31%	16	2.69%	595
Macon	884	89.02%	109	10.98%	993
Madison	1,636	94.29%	99	5.71%	1,735
Marion	406	92.69%	32	7.31%	438
Marshall	106	97.25%	3	2.75%	109
Maury	592	98.01%	12	1.99%	604
McMinn	845	95.16%	43	4.84%	888
Mcnairy	317	96.94%	10	3.06%	327
Meigs	232	100%	0	0%	232
Monroe	667	97.66%	16	2.34%	683
Montgomery	1,219	96.21%	48	3.79%	1,267
Moore	69	98.57%	1	1.43%	70
Morgan	159	96.95%	5	3.05%	164
Obion	131	95.62%	6	4.38%	137
Overton	262	97.04%	8	2.96%	270
Perry	38	95.00%	2	5.00%	40
Pickett	385	89.12%	47	10.88%	432
Polk	232	95.08%	12	4.92%	244
Putnam	524	96.50%	19	3.50%	543
Rhea	768	95.88%	33	4.12%	801
Roane	534	98.16%	10	1.84%	544
Robertson	349	97.21%	10	2.79%	359
Rutherford	3,483	94.83%	190	5.17%	3,673
Scott	149	97.39%	4	2.61%	153
Sequatchie	80	96.39%	3	3.61%	83
Sevier	2,297	95.00%	121	5.00%	2,418
Shelby	11,792	96.67%	406	3.33%	12,198
Smith	99	99.00%	1	1.00%	100
Stewart	204	98.55%	3	1.45%	207
Sullivan	1,261	96.55%	45	3.45%	1,306
Sumner	1,064	97.79%	24	2.21%	1,088
Tipton	531	96.90%	17	3.10%	548
Trousdale	37	97.37%	1	2.63%	38
Unicoi	1,778	87.93%	244	12.07%	2,022
Union	199	93.87%	13	6.13%	212
Van Buren	123	99.19%	1	0.81%	124
Warren	409	96.69%	14	3.31%	423
Washington	4,337	95.95%	183	4.05%	4,520
Wayne	254	98.07%	5	1.93%	259
Weakley	224	96.97%	7	3.03%	231
White	144	92.31%	12	7.69%	156
Williamson	2,222	95.90%	95	4.10%	2,317
Wilson	764	96.95%	24	3.05%	788
Total	94,557	95.45%	4,504	4.55%	99,061

== See also ==
- 2004 Republican Party presidential primaries
- 2004 Tennessee Democratic presidential primary
- 2004 United States presidential election in Tennessee
- 2004 Tennessee elections
