= List of awards and nominations received by Wesley Clark =

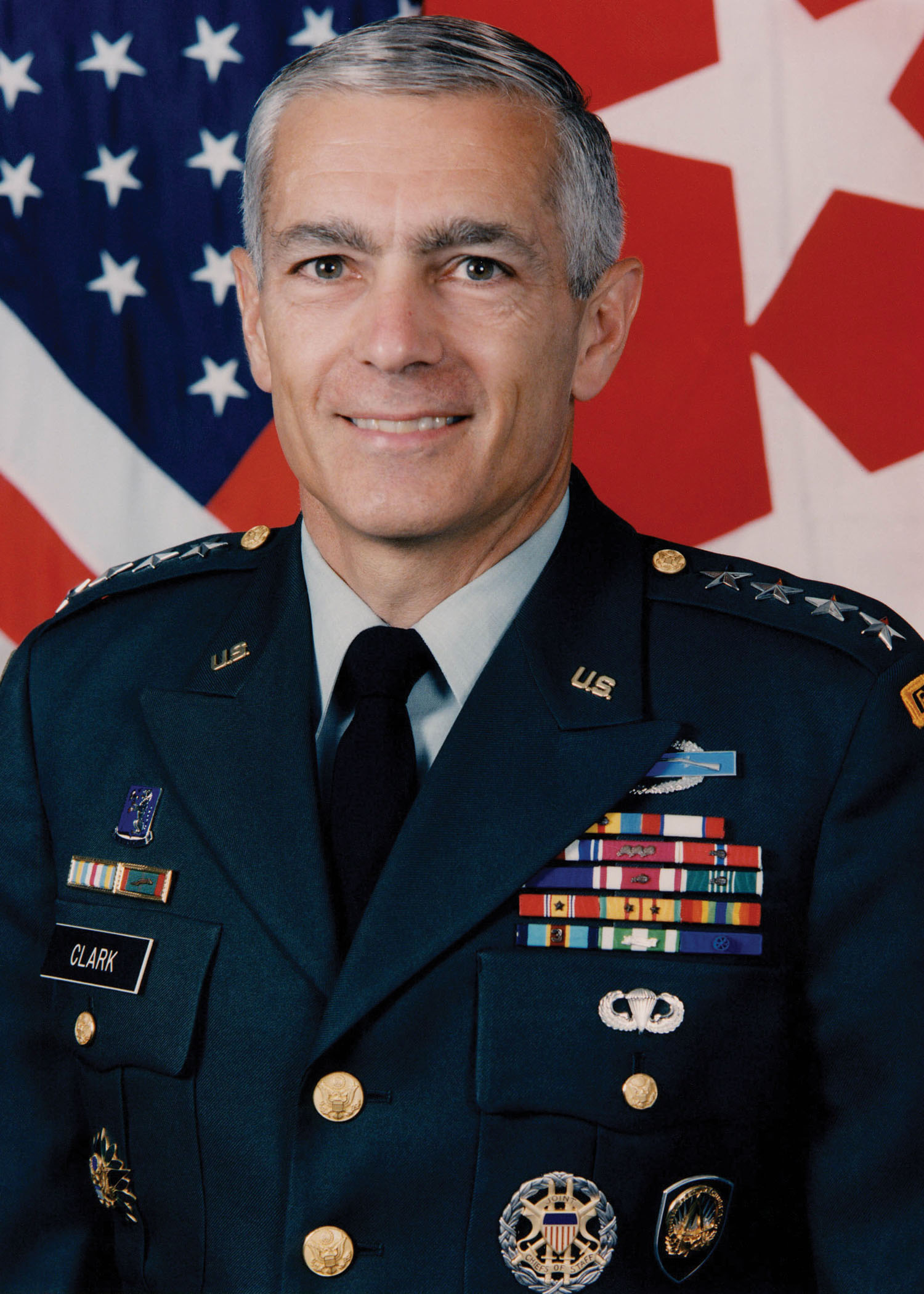
Wesley Clark in full uniform, which displays his U.S. military awards and honors

The following is a list of awards and honors awarded to Wesley Clark. These include awards and decorations of the United States Army, civilian awards, international honors, and knighthoods.

== Awards and honors ==
=== U.S. Military decorations ===
Each "Oak Leaf Cluster" or "Service Star" denotes an additional bestowal of the same award or in the case of some campaign medals, one campaign star is awarded.

Defense Distinguished Service Medal (with four oak leaf clusters)
- For Bosnia service
- Joint Staff, end of tour
- For service at U.S. Southern Command
- For service as Commander of the Kosovo conflict
- For service as Supreme Allied Commander, Europe
Distinguished Service Medal (with oak leaf cluster)
- 1st Cavalry Division 1994
- Upon retirement 2000
Silver Star
- 1970
Legion of Merit (with three oak leaf clusters)
- SHAEF 1979
- D.A. Staff 1983
- MJC 1986
- MJC 1991
Bronze Star (with one oak leaf cluster)
- 1969
- 1970
Purple Heart
- 1970
Meritorious Service Medal (with oak leaf cluster)
- 1977
- 1985
Army Commendation Medal (with oak leaf cluster)
- 1969
- 1974
Joint Meritorious Unit Citation
- 2000
National Defense Service Medal (with service star)
Vietnam Service Medal (with three service stars)
Kosovo Campaign Medal (with one campaign star)
Army Service Ribbon
Overseas Service Ribbon (with award numeral 3)

Combat Infantryman Badge
Ranger Tab
Parachutist Badge
Army Staff Identification Badge
Joint Chiefs of Staff Identification Badge
SACEUR Badge
77th Armored Regiment Distinctive Unit Insignia

=== Civilian awards ===
Presidential Medal of Freedom, 2000
White House Fellowship, 1975
Legacy of Leadership Award, 1999
Lady Liberty Award for National Security and World Peace, 2000
Balkan Peace Award, 2001
Secretary of State's Open Forum Distinguished Public Service Award, 2001
Hanno R. Ellenbogen Citizenship Award, 2013

=== Foreign Honours ===
The United States Constitution prohibits government officials from accepting titles of nobility from foreign governments without Congressional approval, but no such prohibition exists on private citizens. However, the Foreign Gifts and Decorations Act gave such approval in certain circumstances, subject to the approval of "the employing agency". The following are Clark's inductions into honours, some of which from monarchies are categorised as orders of knighthood, in which the rank and grade of knight is the lowest grade in the instance the order has multiple grades:

Albania
	Member of the Decoration of Gjergj Kastrioti Skënderbeu
Argentina
	Grand Cross of the Order of May
Belgium
	Knight Grand Cross of the Order of Leopold I
Estonia
	Grand Cross of the Order of the Cross of the Eagle of Estonia
France
	Commander of the Order of the Legion of Honour
	Officer of the Order of National Merit
Germany
	Grand Cross of the Order of Merit of the Federal Republic of Germany
Hungary
	Unknown Grade of the Order of Merit of the Republic of Hungary
Italy
	Grand Officer of the Military Order of Italy
Latvia
	Grand Cross (with Swords) of the Order of Viesturs
Lithuania
	Grand Cross of the Order of Gediminas
Luxembourg
	Knight Grand Officer of the Order of Merit
Morocco
	Knight Grand Cordon of the Order of Ouissam Alaouite
Netherlands
	Knight Grand Cross (with Swords) of the Order of Orange-Nassau
Poland
	Grand Officer of the Order of Merit of the Republic of Poland
Portugal
	Grand Cross of the Order of Military Merit
Slovenia
	Member of the Order of Freedom of the Republic of Slovenia
United Kingdom
	Honorary Knight Commander of the Order of the British Empire

=== Other Foreign Honors ===
Canadian Meritorious Service Cross (Military version)
Bulgarian Madarski Konnik Medal
Cross of Merit of the Minister of Defence of the Czech Republic First Class
Commemorative Medal of the Minister of Defence of the Slovak Republic First Class
Spanish Military White Grand Cross
Croatian Order of Duke Trpimir with Ribbon and Star
Vietnam Gallantry Cross Unit Citation
Vietnam Civil Actions Unit Citation
Vietnam Campaign Medal
