= 2004 Republican Party presidential primaries =

- January 19 to June 8, 2004

2,509 delegates (1,736 pledged and 773 unpledged) to the Republican National Convention 1,255 (majority) votes needed to win

Candidate	George W. Bush	Uncommitted	Bill Wyatt
Home state	Texas		California
Delegate count	2,509	0 (Note: While there were technically 773 delegates that went to the convention unnbound, they presumably cast their support for the president)	0
Contests won	49	0	0
Popular vote	7,853,863	91,926	10,937
Percentage	98.1%	1.2%	0.1%
- Republican presidential primary, 2004 George W. Bush No votes/information available
Previous Republican nominee
George W. Bush
Republican nominee
George W. Bush

From January 19 to June 8, 2004, voters of the Republican Party chose its nominee for president in the 2004 United States presidential election. Incumbent President George W. Bush was again selected as the nominee through a series of primary elections and caucuses culminating in the 2004 Republican National Convention held from August 30 to September 2, 2004, in New York City.

== Primary race overview ==
Incumbent President George W. Bush announced in mid-2003 that he would campaign for re-election; he faced no major challengers. He then went on, throughout early 2004, to win every nomination contest, including a sweep of Super Tuesday, beating back the vacuum of challengers and maintaining the recent tradition of an easy primary for incumbent Presidents (the last time an incumbent was seriously challenged in a presidential primary contest was when Senator Ted Kennedy challenged Jimmy Carter for the Democratic nomination in 1980).

Bush won every state with comfortable margins: his worst performance was in New Hampshire, where he received 79.8% of the vote. The only human challenger to receive over 5% of the vote in any state was Bill Wyatt from California, who received 10% of the vote in Oklahoma in a minor upset. "Uncommitted" also received over 5% of the vote in Massachusetts (8.7%), Rhode Island (12.4%) and Texas (7.5%).

Bush managed to raise US$130 million in 2003 alone, and expected to set a national primary fund-raising record of $200 million by the time of the 2004 Republican National Convention in New York City.

Several states and territories canceled their respective Republican primaries altogether, citing Bush being the only candidate to qualify on their respective ballot, including Connecticut, Florida, Mississippi, New York, Puerto Rico, and South Dakota.

Senator Lincoln Chafee of Rhode Island, an opponent of the war in Iraq, Bush's tax cuts, drilling in the Arctic National Wildlife Refuge, and much of Bush's social agenda, considered challenging Bush in the New Hampshire primary in the fall of 2003. He decided not to run after the capture of Saddam Hussein in December 2003. He would later change his party affiliation to Democratic and run in that party's 2016 presidential primaries.

As of the 2024 presidential election, Bush is the last incumbent president, Democrat or Republican, to win all the delegates going into the national convention.

== Candidates ==
=== Nominee ===
Candidate	Most recent office	Home state	Campaign Withdrawal date	Popular vote	Contests won	Running mate
George W. Bush	President of the United States (2001–2009)	Texas	(Campaign • Positions); Secured nomination: March 10, 2004	7,853,863 (98.01%)	49	Dick Cheney

=== Challengers ===
==== On the ballot in two or more primaries ====
- William Tsangares ran for president under the pseudonym "Bill Wyatt." The then-43-year-old T-shirt maker left the Democratic Party to become a Republican after Democrats voted for the war in Iraq, an action he saw as a betrayal. Tsangares traveled 12,000 miles and spent an estimated $20,000 on his presidential campaign. He managed to get on the ballot in New Hampshire, Missouri, Oklahoma, and Louisiana, and even the Democratic Primary ballot in Arizona. He finished tenth in the New Hampshire primary with 0.23% of the vote (153 votes), placed second in Missouri, where he received 1,268 votes (1.03%). However, a minor upset occurred on Mini-Tuesday when Tsangares won just over 10% of the vote in Oklahoma and 4% in Louisiana. He also received 233 votes (0.10%) in the Arizona Democratic primary.
- Blake Ashby, a Republican entrepreneur frustrated with the explosion of debt under President Bush, ran as a protest candidate in the Republican primaries. On the ballot in New Hampshire and Missouri, he spent approximately $20,000 on his campaign, visiting New Hampshire and campaigning in his home state of Missouri and participated in the C-SPAN Minor Candidates Forum. He finished seventh in New Hampshire with 264 votes, and third in Missouri with 981 votes.

Candidate	Home state	Total votes	%
Uncommitted	–	91,926	1.1%
(others)	various	49,281	0.8%
Bill Wyatt	California	10,847	0%
Blake Ashby	Missouri	1.145	0%

==== On the ballot in one primary ====
All but one of the following were on the ballot only in the state of New Hampshire.

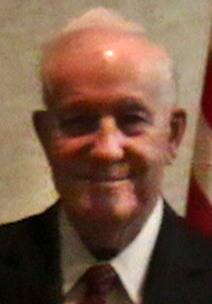
Retired engineer Jack Fellure of West Virginia
got 14 votes in the North Dakota Caucases.

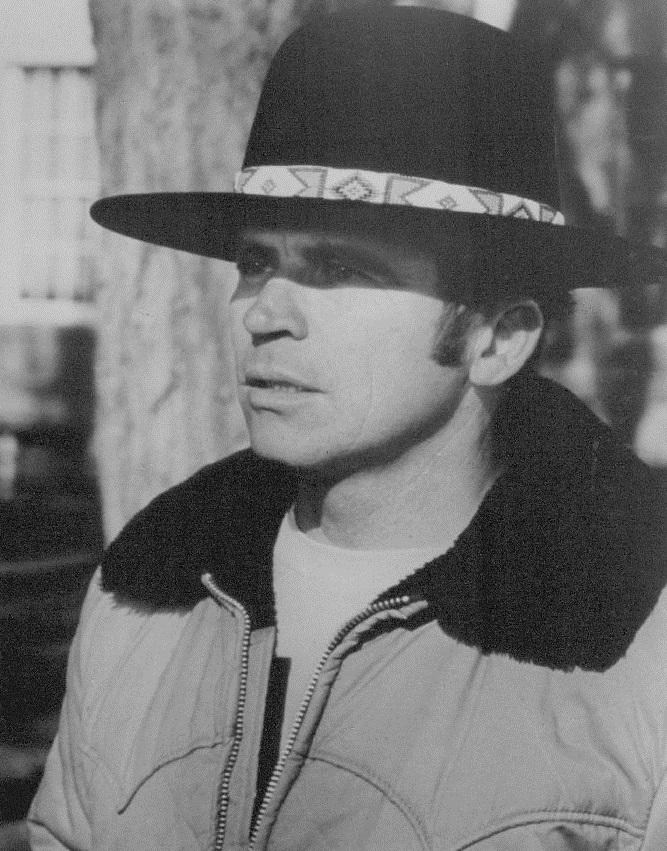
Actor Tom Laughlin of California

==== Declined to be candidates ====
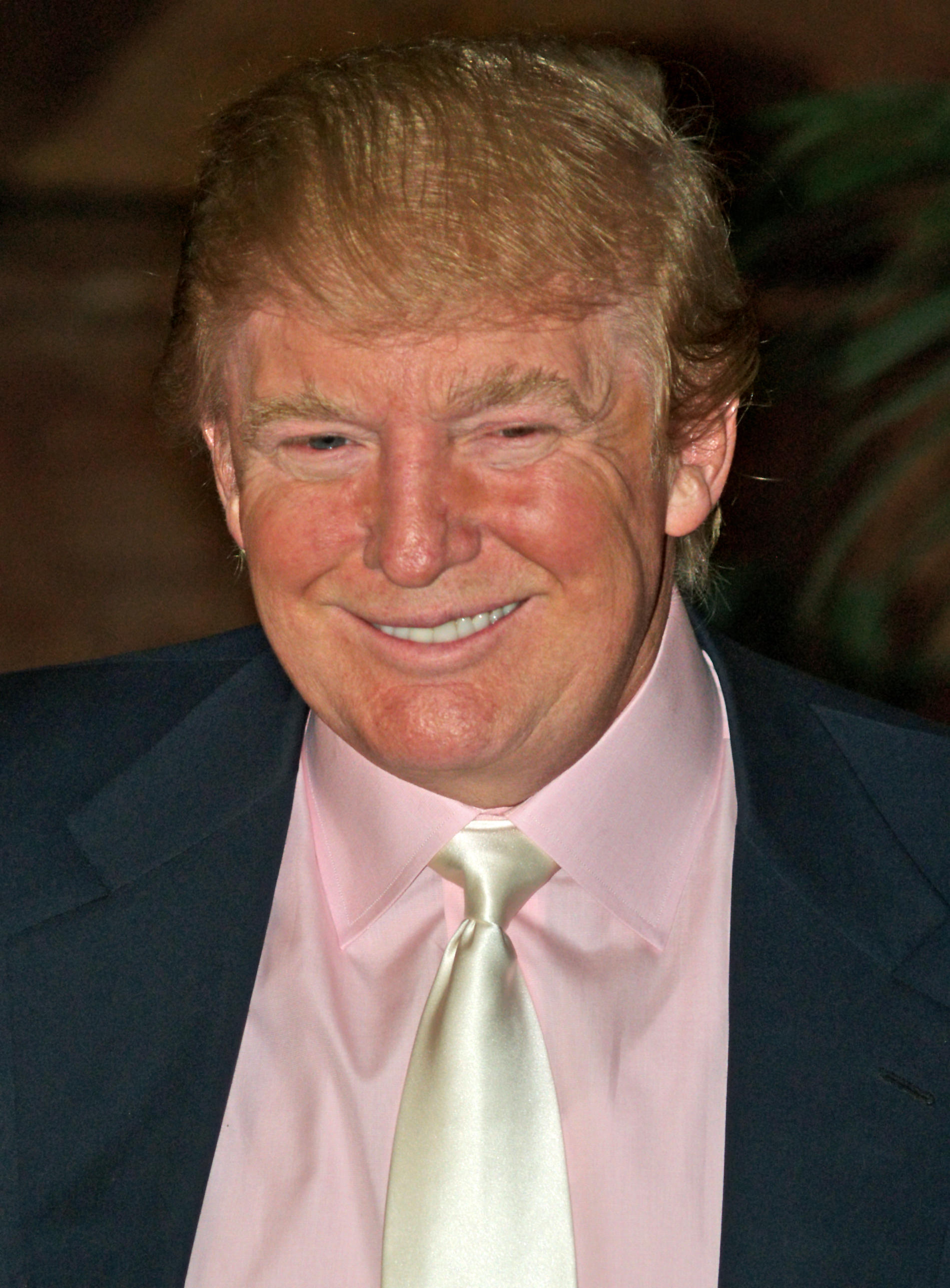
Businessman
Donald Trump
from New York

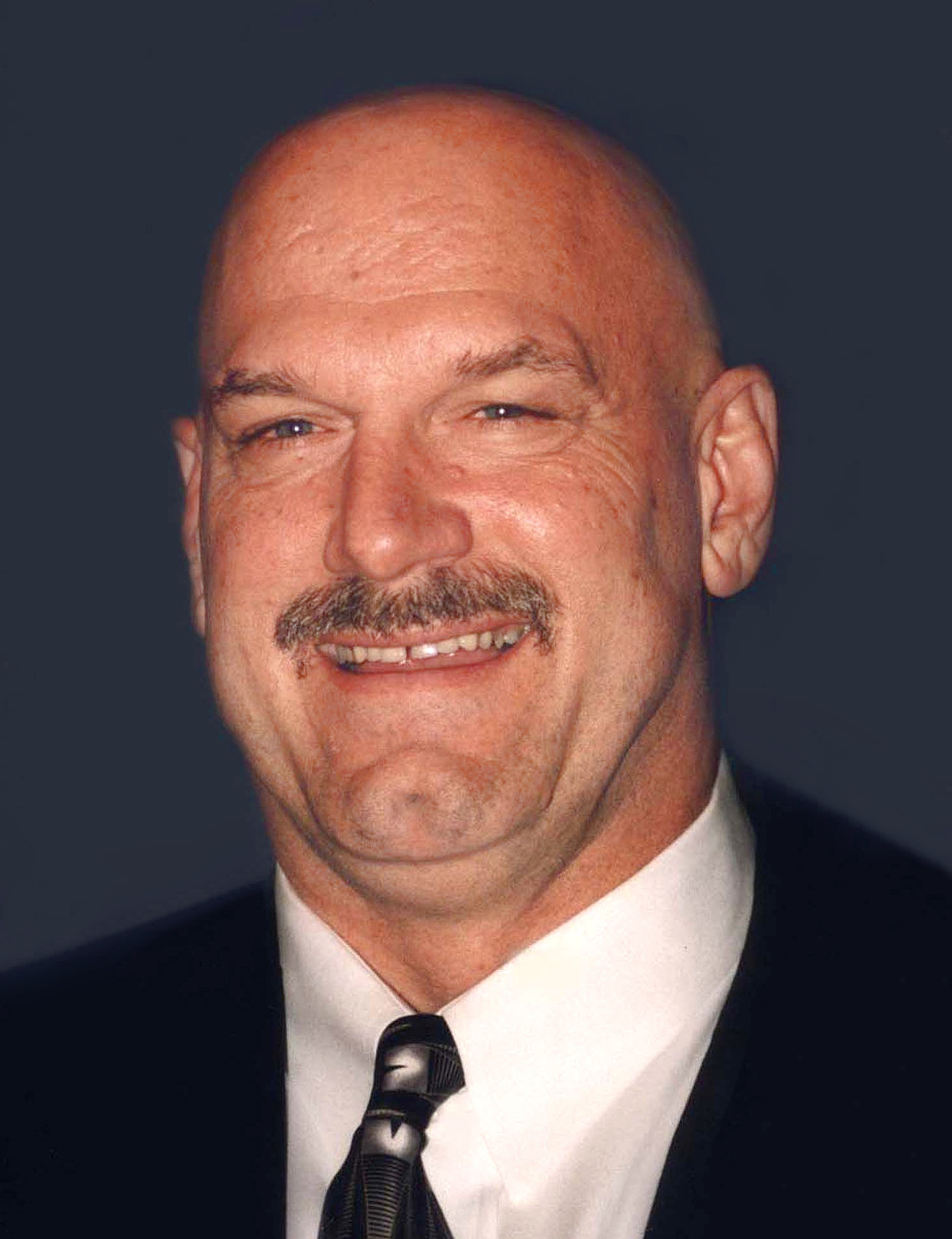
Former Governor
Jesse Ventura
from Minnesota
(Independent)

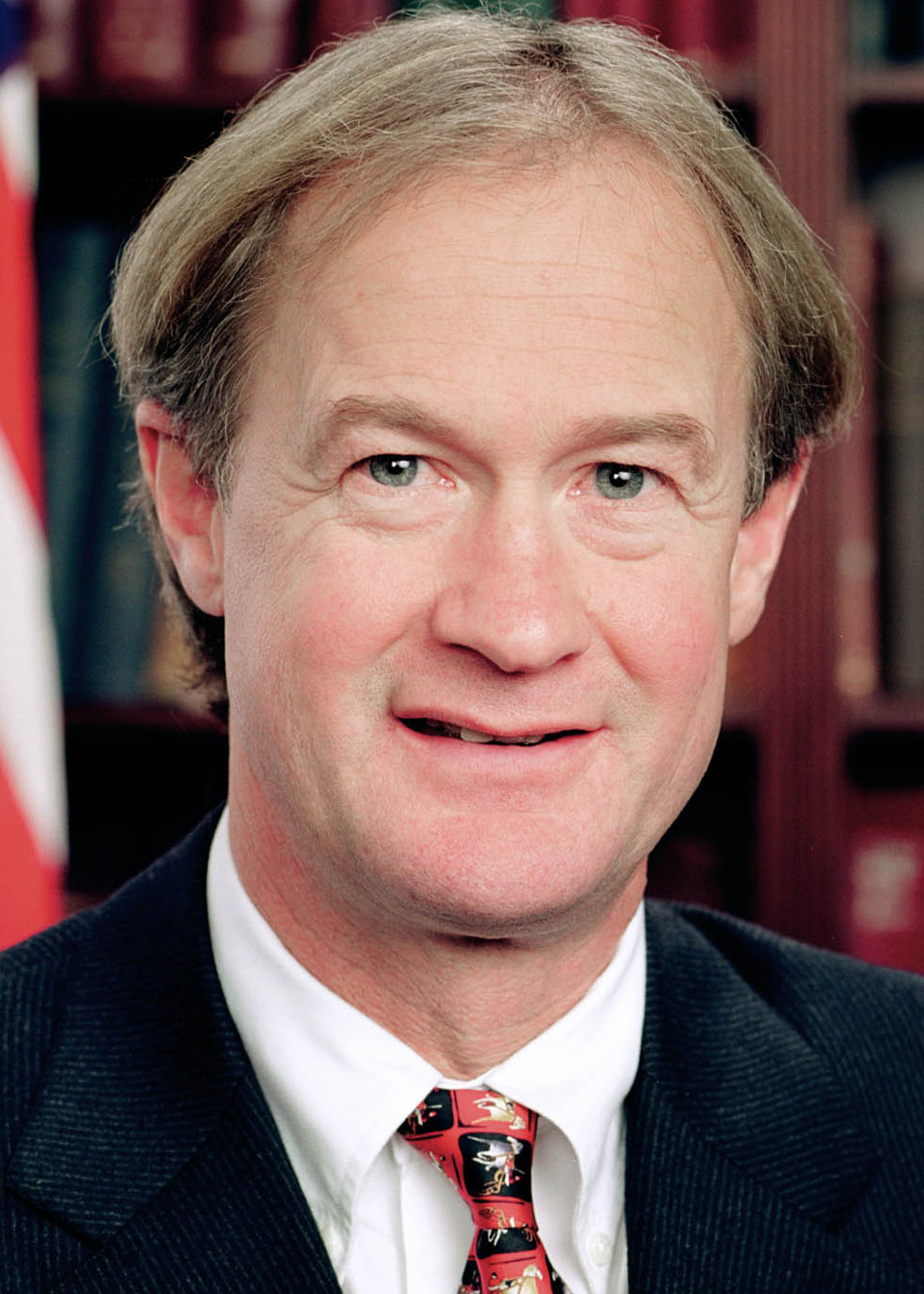
U.S. Senator
Lincoln Chafee
from Rhode Island

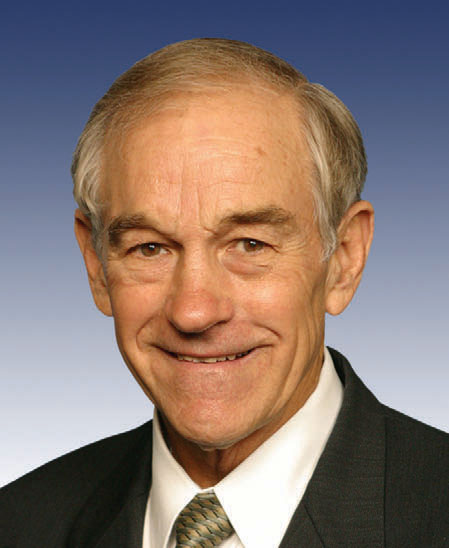
U.S. Representative
Ron Paul
from Texas

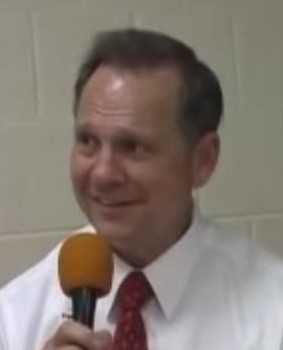
Former State Chief Justice
Roy Moore
from Alabama

Candidate	Home state	Total votes	%
Richard Bosa	New Hampshire	841	1.2%
John Buchanan	Georgia	836	1.2%
John Rigazio	New Hampshire	803	1.2%
Robert Haines	New Hampshire	579	0.9%
Michael Callis	New Hampshire	388	0.6%
Millie Howard	Ohio	239	0.4%
Tom Laughlin	California	154	0.2%
Jim Taylor		124	0.2%
Mark "Dick" Harnes		87	0.1%
Cornelius E. O'Connor		77	0.1%
George Gostigian		52	0.1%
Jack Fellure	West Virginia	14	0%

== Results ==
There were 2,509 total delegates to the 2004 Republican National Convention, of which 650 were so-called "superdelegates" who were not bound by any particular state's primary or caucus votes and could change their votes at any time. A candidate needs 1,255 delegates to become the nominee. Except for the Northern Mariana Islands and Midway Atoll, all states, territories, and other inhabited areas of the United States offer delegates to the 2004 Republican National Convention.

=== Contested primaries ===
For brevity, states that did not hold a contest or had Bush as the only option on the ballot are omitted. Only candidates who placed third or better in a primary are included.

Legend:	1st place (popular vote)	2nd place (popular vote)	3rd place (popular vote)	Candidate has withdrawn	Candidate unable to appear on ballot

Date	Pledged delegates	Contest	George W. Bush	BW Bill Wyatt	Jack Fellure	Other	Uncommitted	Total votes cast
January 27	29	New Hampshire	79.8% 29 delegates 53,962 votes	0.2% 153 votes	Not on ballot	20.0% 13,718 votes (Note: 4.2% for John Kerry (write-in, 2,819 votes); 2.7% for Howard Dean (write-in, 1,789 votes); 6.6% for other on-ballot candidates (4,444 votes); 6.8% for other write-ins (4,666 votes))	Not on ballot	67,833 votes
February 3 Mini-Tuesday	57	Missouri	95.1% 57 delegates 117,007 votes	1.0% 1,268 votes	Not on ballot	0.8% 981 votes (Note: All for Blake Ashby)	3.1% 3,830 votes	123,086 votes
February 3 Mini-Tuesday	26	North Dakota	99.1% 26 delegates 2,002 votes	Not on ballot	0.7% 14 votes	0.2% 4 votes (Note: All for Ed Schafer (not running))	Not on ballot	2,020 votes
February 3 Mini-Tuesday	41	Oklahoma	90.0% 41 delegates 59,577 votes	10.0% 6,635 votes	Not on ballot			66,198 votes
February 10	52	Tennessee	95.4% 52 delegates 94,557 votes	Not on ballot			4.6% 4,504 votes	99,061 votes
February 17	37	Wisconsin	99.2% 37 delegates 158,677 votes	Not on ballot			0.8% 1,207 votes	159,884 votes
March 2 Super Tuesday	41	Massachusetts	90.6% 41 delegates 62,773 votes	Not on ballot		0.7% 455 votes (Note: Various write-ins)	8.7% 6,050 votes	69,278 votes
March 2 Super Tuesday	18	Rhode Island	84.9% 18 delegates 2,152 votes	Not on ballot		2.7% 69 votes (Note: Various write-ins)	12.4% 314 votes	2,535 votes
March 9	45	Louisiana	96.1% 45 delegates 69,205 votes	3.9% 2,805 votes	Not on ballot			72,010 votes
March 9	135	Texas	92.5% 135 delegates 635,948 votes	Not on ballot			7.5% 51,667 votes	2,535 votes
March 16	60	Illinois	100% 60 delegates 583,575 votes	Not on ballot			Not on ballot	583,575 votes
May 18	35	Arkansas	97.1% 35 delegates 37,234 votes	Not on ballot			2.9% 1,129 votes	38,363 votes
May 18	43	Kentucky	92.5% 43 delegates 108,603 votes	Not on ballot			7.5% 8,776 votes	117,379 votes
May 18	28	Oregon	94.9% 28 delegates 293,806 votes	Not on ballot			5.1% 15,700 votes	309,506 votes
May 25	26	Idaho	89.5% 26 delegates 110,800 votes	Not on ballot			10.5% 12,993 votes	123,793 votes
June 1	45	Alabama	92.8% 45 delegates 187,038 votes	Not on ballot			7.2% 14,449 votes	201,487 votes
Totals votes from contested states	718	16 contests	95.3% 718 delegates 2,576,916 votes	0.4% 10,861 votes	0.000% 14 votes	0.53% 15,227 votes	5.2% 120,619 votes	2,723,637 votes
Convention roll call			100% 2,509 delegates	0%				

=== Counties carried ===
Republican presidential primary, 2004 results by county (exceptions: Minnesota, Maryland, Nebraska & North Dakota – at-large) George W. Bush No votes/information available

== See also ==
- 2004 Democratic Party presidential primaries
