= 2004 Oregon Republican presidential primary =

- May 18, 2004

28 delegate to the 2004 Republican National Convention

Candidate	George W. Bush	Uncommitted (voting option)
Home state	Texas
Delegate count	28
Popular vote	293,806	15,700
Percentage	94.9%	5.1%
- Primary results by county Bush: 90–95% 95–100%

The 2004 Oregon Republican presidential primary was held on May 18, 2000, as part of the 2004 Republican Party primaries for the 2004 presidential election. 28 delegates to the 2004 Republican National Convention were allocated to the presidential candidates. The contest was alongside the Kentucky primary and Arkansas primary.

Incumbent President George W. Bush won the contest by a total of 28 delegates.

== Candidates ==
The following candidates were on the ballot:

- Incumbent President George W. Bush
- Uncommitted (voting option)

== Results ==
Incumbent President George W. Bush won the primary with a total of 28 delegates to the 2004 Republican National Convention and 293,806 popular votes (94.9%) from the state of Oregon. Uncommitted, which was just a voting option, received 15,700 popular votes (5.1%). President Bush continued to win, Bush has won every primary contest since New Hampshire started.

Republican primary, May 18, 2004
Candidate	Votes	Percentage	Actual delegate count		
Candidate	Votes	Percentage	Bound	Unbound	Total
George W. Bush	293,806	94.9%	28		28
Uncommitted (voting option)	15,700	5.1%			
Total:	309,506	100.00%	28		28

== See also ==
- 2004 United States presidential election in Oregon
- 2004 Oregon Democratic presidential primary
- 2004 United States presidential election
- 2004 Democratic Party presidential primaries
