= 2004 United States presidential election in Oklahoma =

- November 2, 2004
- Turnout: 68.3% (of registered voters); 55.6% (of voting age population)

Nominee	George W. Bush	John Kerry
Party	Republican	Democratic
Home state	Texas	Massachusetts
Running mate	Dick Cheney	John Edwards
Electoral vote	7	0
Popular vote	959,792	503,966
Percentage	65.57%	34.43%

Bush
50–60%
60–70%
70–80%
80–90%
90–100%
Kerry
50–60%
60–70%
70–80%
80–90%
90–100%
Other
Tie
No vote
President before election
George W. Bush
Republican
Elected President
George W. Bush
Republican

The 2004 United States presidential election in Oklahoma took place on November 2, 2004, and was part of the 2004 United States presidential election. Voters chose seven representatives, or electors, to the Electoral College, who voted for president and vice president.

Oklahoma was won by incumbent President George W. Bush by a 31.14% margin of victory. Prior to the election, all 12 news organizations considered this a state Bush would win, or otherwise considered a safe red state. Bush won this state, every single county, and congressional district. Giving Bush 65.57% of the vote, it was the most Republican state in the south and Bush's fifth best performance in the country after Utah, Wyoming, Idaho and Nebraska.

Oklahoma has been a Republican-leaning state since 1952 and a Republican stronghold since 1980. This was the first of six consecutive elections to date in which every county in the state was won by the Republican candidate.

== Primaries ==
- 2004 Oklahoma Democratic presidential primary
- 2004 Oklahoma Republican presidential primary

== Campaign ==
=== Predictions ===
There were 12 news organizations who made state-by-state predictions of the election. Here are their last predictions before election day.

Source	Ranking
D.C. Political Report	Solid R
Cook Political Report	Solid R
Research 2000	Solid R
Zogby International	Likely R
Washington Post	Likely R
Washington Dispatch	Likely R
Washington Times	Solid R
The New York Times	Solid R
CNN	Likely R
Newsweek	Solid R
Associated Press	Solid R
Rasmussen Reports	Likely R

=== Polling ===
Bush won every single pre-election poll, each with a double-digit margin and with at least 53% of the vote, except for the first poll. Many polls had Bush winning with a 30% margin or even higher. The final three polls' average had Bush leading 63% to 32%.

=== Fundraising ===
Bush raised $1,194,549. Kerry raised $357,038.

=== Advertising and visits ===
Neither campaign advertised or visited this state during the fall campaign.

== Analysis ==
By 2000, Oklahoma had long been one of the more Republican-leaning states in the South, having been one of only two Southern states to have voted for Gerald Ford over Jimmy Carter in 1976, and having been one of a handful of Southern states never to vote for Bill Clinton. In 2000, George W. Bush, then the governor of the neighboring state of Texas, carried Oklahoma with a little over 60% of the vote, making it his sixth-best state nationally and his best state in the South that year. However, Al Gore did manage to carry a cluster of traditionally Democratic rural counties in the eastern part of the state.

In 2004, Bush improved his percentage in Oklahoma by a little over 5% and carried every county in the state, the first of six consecutive elections (as of 2024) in which the Republican has swept the state's counties. He performed strongly in both the state's rural areas, and in its two main population centers, getting 64% of the vote in both Oklahoma and Tulsa Counties. Only in six counties was Kerry so much as able to hold Bush to a single-digit margin: Cherokee, Choctaw, Coal, McIntosh, Muskogee, and Okmulgee. None of these cast over 30,000 votes. However, in McIntosh County, John Kerry held Bush to a margin of just 2%, which would be the closest any Democrat since Gore came to carrying any Oklahoma county until Joe Biden came within 1.5% of carrying Oklahoma County in 2020.

The third-party vote, which had amounted to 1.26% of the total state vote in 2000, disappeared in 2004, as no independent obtained ballot access in the state in 2004. Oklahoma has the toughest laws regarding third-party ballot access, and 2004 was the first of three elections in a row in which only the Democrat and the Republican appeared on the ballot (with write-in votes not allowed).

== Results ==
2004 United States presidential election in Oklahoma
Party	Candidate	Running mate	Votes	Percentage	Electoral votes
Republican	George W. Bush (incumbent)	Dick Cheney (incumbent)	959,792	65.57%	7
Democratic	John Kerry	John Edwards	503,966	34.43%	0
Voter turnout (Voting age population)					55.6%

=== By county ===
County	George W. Bush Republican		John Kerry Democratic		Margin		Total
County	#	%	#	%	#	%	Total
Adair	4,971	65.99%	2,562	34.01%	2,409	31.98%	7,533
Alfalfa	2,201	82.40%	470	17.60%	1,731	64.80%	2,671
Atoka	3,142	61.75%	1,946	38.25%	1,196	23.50%	5,088
Beaver	2,272	88.44%	297	11.56%	1,975	76.88%	2,569
Beckham	5,454	73.85%	1,931	26.15%	3,523	47.70%	7,385
Blaine	3,199	72.36%	1,222	27.64%	1,977	44.72%	4,421
Bryan	8,615	59.99%	5,745	40.01%	2,870	19.98%	14,360
Caddo	6,491	62.37%	3,916	37.63%	2,575	24.74%	10,407
Canadian	33,297	77.42%	9,712	22.58%	23,585	54.84%	43,009
Carter	12,178	65.32%	6,466	34.68%	5,712	30.64%	18,644
Cherokee	9,569	52.60%	8,623	47.40%	946	5.20%	18,192
Choctaw	3,168	54.55%	2,639	45.45%	529	9.10%	5,807
Cimarron	1,242	87.10%	184	12.90%	1,058	74.20%	1,426
Cleveland	65,720	65.90%	34,007	34.10%	31,713	31.80%	99,727
Coal	1,396	53.71%	1,203	46.29%	193	7.42%	2,599
Comanche	21,170	63.78%	12,022	36.22%	9,148	27.56%	33,192
Cotton	1,742	65.98%	898	34.02%	844	31.96%	2,640
Craig	3,894	60.86%	2,504	39.14%	1,390	21.72%	6,398
Creek	18,848	65.50%	9,929	34.50%	8,919	31.00%	28,777
Custer	7,839	73.67%	2,801	26.33%	5,038	47.34%	10,640
Delaware	10,017	64.18%	5,591	35.82%	4,426	28.36%	15,608
Dewey	1,843	81.87%	408	18.13%	1,435	63.74%	2,251
Ellis	1,685	81.01%	395	18.99%	1,290	62.02%	2,080
Garfield	17,685	76.00%	5,586	24.00%	12,099	52.00%	23,271
Garvin	7,610	67.24%	3,707	32.76%	3,903	34.48%	11,317
Grady	14,136	70.31%	5,970	29.69%	8,166	40.62%	20,106
Grant	1,950	77.35%	571	22.65%	1,379	54.70%	2,521
Greer	1,529	68.02%	719	31.98%	810	36.04%	2,248
Harmon	838	70.30%	354	29.70%	484	40.60%	1,192
Harper	1,397	83.90%	268	16.10%	1,129	67.80%	1,665
Haskell	2,946	55.33%	2,378	44.67%	568	10.66%	5,324
Hughes	3,066	57.32%	2,283	42.68%	783	14.64%	5,349
Jackson	7,024	75.89%	2,232	24.11%	4,792	51.78%	9,256
Jefferson	1,546	59.39%	1,057	40.61%	489	18.78%	2,603
Johnston	2,635	60.60%	1,713	39.40%	922	21.20%	4,348
Kay	14,121	70.33%	5,957	29.67%	8,164	40.66%	20,078
Kingfisher	5,630	84.64%	1,022	15.36%	4,608	69.28%	6,652
Kiowa	2,610	64.88%	1,413	35.12%	1,197	29.76%	4,023
Latimer	2,535	56.58%	1,945	43.42%	590	13.16%	4,480
LeFlore	10,683	61.31%	6,741	38.69%	3,942	22.62%	17,424
Lincoln	10,149	71.52%	4,041	28.48%	6,108	43.04%	14,190
Logan	11,474	70.21%	4,869	29.79%	6,605	40.42%	16,343
Love	2,295	59.87%	1,538	40.13%	757	19.74%	3,833
Major	3,122	85.32%	537	14.68%	2,585	70.64%	3,659
Marshall	3,363	61.70%	2,088	38.30%	1,275	23.40%	5,451
Mayes	9,946	58.93%	6,933	41.07%	3,013	17.86%	16,879
McClain	10,041	72.85%	3,742	27.15%	6,299	45.70%	13,783
McCurtain	7,472	66.98%	3,684	33.02%	3,788	33.96%	11,156
McIntosh	4,692	51.11%	4,488	48.89%	204	2.22%	9,180
Murray	3,665	63.24%	2,130	36.76%	1,535	26.48%	5,795
Muskogee	15,124	54.58%	12,585	45.42%	2,539	9.16%	27,709
Noble	3,993	74.94%	1,335	25.06%	2,658	49.88%	5,328
Nowata	2,805	62.82%	1,660	37.18%	1,145	25.64%	4,465
Okfuskee	2,542	59.32%	1,743	40.68%	799	18.64%	4,285
Oklahoma	174,741	64.23%	97,298	35.77%	77,443	28.46%	272,039
Okmulgee	8,363	53.17%	7,367	46.83%	996	6.34%	15,730
Osage	11,467	58.70%	8,068	41.30%	3,399	17.40%	19,535
Ottawa	7,443	59.41%	5,086	40.59%	2,357	18.82%	12,529
Pawnee	4,412	63.25%	2,564	36.75%	1,848	26.50%	6,976
Payne	19,560	65.95%	10,101	34.05%	9,459	31.90%	29,661
Pittsburg	11,134	59.91%	7,452	40.09%	3,682	19.82%	18,586
Pontotoc	9,647	65.13%	5,165	34.87%	4,482	30.26%	14,812
Pottawatomie	17,215	66.59%	8,638	33.41%	8,577	33.18%	25,853
Pushmataha	2,863	59.68%	1,934	40.32%	929	19.36%	4,797
Roger Mills	1,388	78.42%	382	21.58%	1,006	56.84%	1,770
Rogers	24,976	67.70%	11,918	32.30%	13,058	35.40%	36,894
Seminole	5,624	60.66%	3,648	39.34%	1,976	21.32%	9,272
Sequoyah	8,865	60.00%	5,910	40.00%	2,955	20.00%	14,775
Stephens	13,646	71.22%	5,515	28.78%	8,131	42.44%	19,161
Texas	5,450	84.29%	1,016	15.71%	4,434	68.58%	6,466
Tillman	2,273	65.92%	1,175	34.08%	1,098	31.84%	3,448
Tulsa	163,452	64.43%	90,220	35.57%	73,232	28.86%	253,672
Wagoner	19,081	67.57%	9,157	32.43%	9,924	35.14%	28,238
Washington	16,551	70.69%	6,862	29.31%	9,689	41.38%	23,413
Washita	3,705	73.44%	1,340	26.56%	2,365	46.88%	5,045
Woods	3,166	77.26%	932	22.74%	2,234	54.52%	4,098
Woodward	6,193	80.94%	1,458	19.06%	4,735	61.88%	7,651
Totals	959,792	65.57%	503,966	34.43%	455,826	31.14%	1,463,758

==== Counties that flipped from Democratic to Republican ====
- Cherokee (largest city: Tahlequah)
- Choctaw (largest city: Hugo)
- Haskell (largest city: Stigler)
- Hughes (largest city: Holdenville)
- Latimer (largest city: Wilburton)
- McIntosh (largest city: Checotah)
- Muskogee (largest city: Muskogee)
- Okmulgee (largest city: Okmulgee)
- Ottawa (largest city: Miami)

=== By congressional district ===
Bush won all five congressional districts, including one held by a Democrat.

District	Bush	Kerry	Representative
1st	65%	35%	John Sullivan
2nd	59%	41%	Brad Carson
2nd	59%	41%	Dan Boren
3rd	72%	28%	Frank Lucas
4th	67%	33%	Tom Cole
5th	64%	36%	Ernest Istook

== Electors ==
Technically the voters of Oklahoma cast their ballots for electors: representatives to the Electoral College. Oklahoma is allocated seven electors because it has five congressional districts and two senators. All candidates who appear on the ballot or qualify to receive write-in votes must submit a list of seven electors, who pledge to vote for their candidate and their running mate. Whoever wins the majority of votes in the state is awarded all seven electoral votes. Their chosen electors then vote for president and vice president. Although electors are pledged to their candidate and running mate, they are not obligated to vote for them. An elector who votes for someone other than their candidate is known as a faithless elector.

The electors of each state and the District of Columbia met on December 13, 2004, to cast their votes for president and vice president. The Electoral College itself never meets as one body. Instead, the electors from each state and the District of Columbia met in their respective capitols.

The following were the members of the Electoral College from the state. All 7 were pledged for Bush/Cheney:

1. George Wiland
2. Paul Hollrah
3. Colby Schwartz
4. Diana Gunther
5. Ken Bartlett
6. Donald Burdick
7. Bob Hudspeth

The slate for the Democrats, which was not elected, consisted of George Krumme, Edwynne Krumme, Maxine Horner, Jim Hamilton, Bernice Mitchell, Betty McElderry, and Bob Lemon.

== See also ==
- United States presidential elections in Oklahoma
- Presidency of George W. Bush
