= 2004 Massachusetts Republican presidential primary =

- March 2, 2004

41 delegate to the 2004 Republican National Convention

Candidate	George W. Bush	Uncommitted
Home state	Texas	–
Delegate count	41	0
Popular vote	62,773	6,050
Percentage	90.6%	8.7%

The 2004 Massachusetts Republican presidential primary was held on March 2, 2004, as part of the 2004 Republican Party primaries for the 2004 presidential election. 41 delegates to the 2004 Democratic National Convention were allocated to presidential candidates. The contest was held on Super Tuesday alongside primaries in Rhode Island. Although there were only two states organized, called it as "Mini-Tuesday".

President Bush won the primary in a landslide, there weren't many competitors in this race.

== Candidates ==
The following candidates:

- President George W. Bush
- Write-ins
- Uncommitted (voting option)

== Results ==
President George W. Bush won the primary with 62,773 popular votes (90,6%) and 41 delegates to the Republican National Convention, Bush did not encounter many obstacles in the contest. Write-ins received 455 popular votes (0,7%) and Uncommitted received 6,050 popular votes (8,7%), this was still one of the biggest records of a Republican primary.

Results:

Massachusetts Republican primary, March 2, 2004
Candidate	Votes	Percentage	Actual delegate count		
Candidate	Votes	Percentage	Bound	Unbound	Total
George W. Bush	62,773	90,6%	41		41
Uncommitted (voting option)	6,050	8.7%			
Write-in candidate	455	0.7%			
Total:	69,278	100.00%	41		41

== See also ==
- 2004 United States presidential election
- 2004 United States presidential election in Massachusetts
- 2004 Massachusetts Democratic presidential primary
- 2004 Democratic Party presidential primaries
