= 2004 United States presidential election in Kentucky =

- November 2, 2004
- Turnout: 64.74%

Nominee	George W. Bush	John Kerry
Party	Republican	Democratic
Home state	Texas	Massachusetts
Running mate	Dick Cheney	John Edwards
Electoral vote	8	0
Popular vote	1,069,439	712,733
Percentage	59.55%	39.69%

Bush
50–60%
60–70%
70–80%
80–90%
Kerry
40–50%
50–60%
60–70%
President before election
George W. Bush
Republican
Elected President
George W. Bush
Republican

The 2004 United States presidential election in Kentucky took place on November 2, 2004, and was part of the 2004 United States presidential election. Voters chose eight representatives, or electors, to the Electoral College, who voted for president and vice president.

Kentucky was won by incumbent President George W. Bush by a 19.86% margin of victory. Prior to the election, all 12 news organizations considered this a state Bush would win, or otherwise a red state. Bush widened his margin of victory since his victory in 2000 against Al Gore, the former senator of neighboring Tennessee, by 4.73%. He made his strongest progress in the eastern part of the state and at the border with Virginia. As of 2024, this is the last election in which Fayette County home of Lexington, Kentucky has voted for the Republican candidate, and the last in which Knott County, Floyd County, Breathitt County, Bath County, Pike County, Carter County, and Magoffin County voted for the Democratic candidate. This was the first time that a Republican won a majority in Ballard County.

This victory coincided with a U.S. Senate election, where controversial Republican incumbent Jim Bunning was narrowly reelected over Daniel Mongiardo, most likely due to Bush's landslide victory.

== Primaries ==
- 2004 Kentucky Democratic presidential primary
- 2004 Kentucky Republican presidential primary

== Campaign ==
=== Predictions ===
There were 12 news organizations who made state-by-state predictions of the election. Here are their last predictions before election day.

Source	Ranking
D.C. Political Report	Solid R
Cook Political Report	Solid R
Research 2000	Solid R
Zogby International	Likely R
Washington Post	Likely R
Washington Dispatch	Likely R
Washington Times	Solid R
The New York Times	Solid R
CNN	Likely R
Newsweek	Solid R
Associated Press	Solid R
Rasmussen Reports	Likely R

=== Polling ===
Bush won every single pre-election poll, and won each by a double-digit margin of victory and with at least 52% of the vote. The final three polls averaged Bush leading 57% to 38%.

=== Fundraising ===
Bush raised $2,398,982. Kerry raised $1,433,748.

=== Advertising and visits ===
Neither campaign advertised or visited this state during the fall campaign.

== Results ==
President George W. Bush easily defeated Massachusetts Senator John F. Kerry in Kentucky, capturing the state's 8 electoral votes. Bush did well throughout the state. Kerry only won a handful of counties. Kerry performed decently in coal country in east Kentucky but fared poorly in other rural parts of the state. Kerry did win Jefferson County, the most populous county in the state and home of Louisville. However this was not enough to overcome Bush's lead. This race was not close, whereas the concurrent senate race was very tight.

United States presidential election in Kentucky, 2004
Party	Candidate	Votes	Percentage	Electoral votes
Republican	George W. Bush (incumbent)	1,069,439	59.55%	8
Democratic	John Kerry	712,733	39.69%	0
Reform	Ralph Nader	8,856	0.49%	0
Libertarian	Michael Badnarik	2,619	0.15%	0
Constitution	Michael Peroutka	2,213	0.12%	0
Totals		1,795,860	100.00%	8
Voter turnout (voting age population)				57.5%

=== By county ===
County	George W. Bush Republican		John Kerry Democratic		Various candidates Other parties		Margin		Total
County	#	%	#	%	#	%	#	%	Total
Adair	5,628	75.57%	1,764	23.69%	55	0.74%	3,864	51.88%	7,447
Allen	5,202	72.62%	1,923	26.85%	38	0.53%	3,279	45.77%	7,163
Anderson	6,363	66.34%	3,141	32.75%	87	0.91%	3,222	33.59%	9,591
Ballard	2,389	57.19%	1,759	42.11%	29	0.70%	630	15.08%	4,177
Barren	10,822	67.05%	5,216	32.32%	102	0.63%	5,606	34.73%	16,140
Bath	2,269	46.13%	2,608	53.02%	42	0.85%	-339	-6.89%	4,919
Bell	6,722	61.10%	4,210	38.27%	70	0.64%	2,512	22.83%	11,002
Boone	32,329	71.71%	12,391	27.49%	362	0.80%	19,938	44.22%	45,082
Bourbon	4,953	60.28%	3,198	38.92%	66	0.80%	1,755	21.36%	8,217
Boyd	11,501	52.81%	10,132	46.53%	144	0.66%	1,369	6.28%	21,777
Boyle	7,764	62.16%	4,646	37.20%	80	0.64%	3,118	24.96%	12,490
Bracken	2,363	65.46%	1,213	33.60%	34	0.95%	1,150	31.86%	3,610
Breathitt	2,542	42.77%	3,327	55.97%	75	1.26%	-785	-13.20%	5,944
Breckinridge	5,580	65.49%	2,884	33.85%	56	0.66%	2,696	31.64%	8,520
Bullitt	19,433	67.88%	9,043	31.59%	151	0.53%	10,390	36.29%	28,627
Butler	4,109	73.66%	1,436	25.74%	33	0.59%	2,673	47.92%	5,578
Caldwell	4,066	64.04%	2,245	35.36%	38	0.60%	1,821	28.68%	6,349
Calloway	9,293	61.36%	5,728	37.82%	124	0.81%	3,565	23.54%	15,145
Campbell	25,540	63.57%	14,253	35.48%	382	0.96%	11,287	28.09%	40,175
Carlisle	1,734	60.95%	1,102	38.73%	9	0.32%	632	22.22%	2,845
Carroll	2,175	55.81%	1,688	43.32%	34	0.87%	487	12.49%	3,897
Carter	5,422	48.77%	5,577	50.17%	118	1.06%	-155	-1.40%	11,117
Casey	5,109	80.83%	1,174	18.57%	38	0.60%	3,935	62.26%	6,321
Christian	13,935	66.31%	6,970	33.17%	110	0.52%	6,965	33.14%	21,015
Clark	9,540	62.28%	5,661	36.96%	116	0.76%	3,879	25.32%	15,317
Clay	5,726	74.49%	1,901	24.73%	60	0.77%	3,825	49.76%	7,687
Clinton	3,369	77.41%	952	21.88%	31	0.72%	2,417	55.53%	4,352
Crittenden	2,726	65.06%	1,438	34.32%	26	0.62%	1,288	30.74%	4,190
Cumberland	2,356	72.74%	848	26.18%	35	1.09%	1,508	46.56%	3,239
Daviess	25,372	61.16%	15,788	38.06%	323	0.78%	9,584	23.10%	41,483
Edmonson	3,595	65.59%	1,856	33.86%	30	0.55%	1,739	31.73%	5,481
Elliott	871	29.46%	2,064	69.80%	22	0.75%	-1,193	-40.34%	2,957
Estill	3,633	65.17%	1,907	34.21%	35	0.63%	1,726	30.96%	5,575
Fayette	66,406	52.88%	57,994	46.18%	1,176	0.94%	8,412	6.70%	125,576
Fleming	3,749	60.44%	2,406	38.79%	48	0.78%	1,343	21.65%	6,203
Floyd	6,612	36.97%	11,132	62.24%	141	0.79%	-4,520	-25.27%	17,885
Franklin	12,281	50.89%	11,620	48.15%	232	0.96%	661	2.74%	24,133
Fulton	1,527	52.84%	1,340	46.37%	23	0.80%	187	6.47%	2,890
Gallatin	1,869	60.82%	1,188	38.66%	16	0.52%	681	22.16%	3,073
Garrard	4,784	71.85%	1,841	27.65%	33	0.50%	2,943	44.20%	6,658
Grant	5,951	67.44%	2,818	31.94%	55	0.62%	3,133	35.50%	8,824
Graves	9,903	61.02%	6,206	38.24%	120	0.74%	3,697	22.78%	16,229
Grayson	7,170	70.69%	2,905	28.64%	68	0.67%	4,265	42.05%	10,143
Green	3,866	74.26%	1,312	25.20%	28	0.54%	2,554	49.06%	5,206
Greenup	8,696	52.91%	7,630	46.43%	109	0.67%	1,066	6.48%	16,435
Hancock	2,286	56.74%	1,709	42.42%	34	0.84%	577	14.32%	4,029
Hardin	24,627	67.58%	11,507	31.58%	307	0.84%	13,120	36.00%	36,441
Harlan	6,659	60.15%	4,332	39.13%	79	0.71%	2,327	21.02%	11,070
Harrison	4,855	62.80%	2,807	36.31%	69	0.89%	2,048	26.49%	7,731
Hart	4,269	62.93%	2,470	36.41%	45	0.67%	1,799	26.52%	6,784
Henderson	10,467	55.97%	8,101	43.32%	133	0.72%	2,366	12.65%	18,701
Henry	4,094	62.99%	2,366	36.41%	39	0.60%	1,728	26.58%	6,499
Hickman	1,395	59.56%	926	39.54%	21	0.90%	469	20.02%	2,342
Hopkins	12,314	65.35%	6,420	34.07%	109	0.58%	5,894	31.28%	18,843
Jackson	4,369	84.38%	769	14.85%	40	0.78%	3,600	69.53%	5,178
Jefferson	164,566	48.75%	170,158	50.41%	2,845	0.84%	-5,592	-1.66%	337,569
Jessamine	12,972	69.82%	5,476	29.47%	132	0.71%	7,496	40.35%	18,580
Johnson	5,940	63.84%	3,288	35.34%	76	0.81%	2,652	28.50%	9,304
Kenton	43,664	65.05%	22,834	34.02%	625	0.93%	20,830	31.03%	67,123
Knott	2,648	35.81%	4,685	63.36%	61	0.83%	-2,037	-27.55%	7,394
Knox	8,108	67.41%	3,822	31.78%	98	0.82%	4,286	35.63%	12,028
LaRue	4,111	68.88%	1,823	30.55%	34	0.57%	2,288	38.33%	5,968
Laurel	16,819	75.54%	5,297	23.79%	148	0.66%	11,522	51.75%	22,264
Lawrence	3,755	57.65%	2,705	41.53%	53	0.81%	1,050	16.12%	6,513
Lee	2,018	69.11%	878	30.07%	24	0.82%	1,140	39.04%	2,920
Leslie	3,661	73.75%	1,266	25.50%	37	0.74%	2,395	48.25%	4,964
Letcher	4,801	52.96%	4,192	46.24%	72	0.79%	609	6.72%	9,065
Lewis	3,778	68.89%	1,667	30.40%	39	0.71%	2,111	38.49%	5,484
Lincoln	5,996	67.65%	2,796	31.55%	71	0.80%	3,200	36.10%	8,863
Livingston	2,675	56.84%	2,007	42.65%	24	0.51%	668	14.19%	4,706
Logan	6,815	64.03%	3,768	35.40%	61	0.57%	3,047	28.63%	10,644
Lyon	2,132	54.32%	1,769	45.07%	24	0.61%	363	9.25%	3,925
McCracken	18,218	61.14%	11,361	38.13%	218	0.73%	6,857	23.01%	29,797
McCreary	4,121	72.39%	1,530	26.88%	42	0.74%	2,591	45.51%	5,693
McLean	2,584	58.26%	1,823	41.10%	28	0.64%	761	17.16%	4,435
Madison	18,922	61.62%	11,525	37.53%	260	0.85%	7,397	24.09%	30,707
Magoffin	2,836	49.60%	2,843	49.72%	39	0.68%	-7	-0.12%	5,718
Marion	3,905	53.10%	3,399	46.22%	50	0.68%	506	6.88%	7,354
Marshall	9,049	58.30%	6,383	41.12%	89	0.58%	2,666	17.18%	15,521
Martin	2,996	66.01%	1,504	33.14%	39	0.86%	1,492	32.87%	4,539
Mason	4,381	61.89%	2,644	37.35%	54	0.76%	1,737	24.54%	7,079
Meade	7,152	65.31%	3,724	34.01%	75	0.69%	3,428	31.30%	10,951
Menifee	1,215	48.06%	1,284	50.79%	29	1.15%	-69	-2.73%	2,528
Mercer	6,745	67.26%	3,224	32.15%	59	0.59%	3,521	35.11%	10,028
Metcalfe	2,645	63.63%	1,472	35.41%	40	0.96%	1,173	28.22%	4,157
Monroe	4,657	79.70%	1,158	19.82%	28	0.48%	3,499	59.88%	5,843
Montgomery	5,647	55.20%	4,506	44.05%	77	0.76%	1,141	11.15%	10,230
Morgan	2,682	50.87%	2,532	48.03%	58	1.10%	150	2.84%	5,272
Muhlenberg	6,749	50.07%	6,636	49.23%	94	0.70%	113	0.84%	13,479
Nelson	10,161	60.32%	6,524	38.73%	159	0.94%	3,637	21.59%	16,844
Nicholas	1,700	55.57%	1,332	43.54%	27	0.88%	368	12.03%	3,059
Ohio	6,311	62.93%	3,627	36.17%	80	0.80%	2,684	26.76%	10,028
Oldham	18,801	69.29%	8,080	29.78%	251	0.93%	10,721	39.51%	27,132
Owen	3,084	65.05%	1,615	34.06%	42	0.89%	1,469	30.99%	4,741
Owsley	1,558	77.94%	430	21.51%	11	0.55%	1,128	56.43%	1,999
Pendleton	4,045	67.14%	1,940	32.20%	40	0.67%	2,105	34.94%	6,025
Perry	6,187	53.08%	5,400	46.33%	68	0.58%	787	6.75%	11,655
Pike	12,611	47.11%	14,002	52.30%	157	0.59%	-1,391	-5.21%	26,770
Powell	2,687	54.17%	2,249	45.34%	24	0.48%	438	8.83%	4,960
Pulaski	19,535	76.56%	5,829	22.84%	152	0.60%	13,706	53.72%	25,516
Robertson	670	61.47%	413	37.89%	7	0.64%	257	23.58%	1,090
Rockcastle	4,804	77.91%	1,320	21.41%	42	0.68%	3,484	56.50%	6,166
Rowan	4,063	46.67%	4,556	52.33%	87	1.00%	-493	-5.66%	8,706
Russell	6,009	76.83%	1,772	22.66%	40	0.51%	4,237	54.17%	7,821
Scott	10,600	62.17%	6,325	37.10%	125	0.73%	4,275	25.07%	17,050
Shelby	10,909	66.87%	5,277	32.35%	127	0.78%	5,632	34.52%	16,313
Simpson	4,273	60.67%	2,730	38.76%	40	0.57%	1,543	21.91%	7,043
Spencer	4,816	70.60%	1,970	28.88%	36	0.53%	2,846	41.72%	6,822
Taylor	7,247	70.39%	2,979	28.94%	69	0.67%	4,268	41.45%	10,295
Todd	3,242	68.20%	1,491	31.36%	21	0.44%	1,751	36.84%	4,754
Trigg	4,023	65.83%	2,046	33.48%	42	0.69%	1,977	32.35%	6,111
Trimble	2,332	61.53%	1,428	37.68%	30	0.79%	904	23.85%	3,790
Union	3,534	59.13%	2,398	40.12%	45	0.75%	1,136	19.01%	5,977
Warren	25,100	63.21%	14,326	36.08%	285	0.72%	10,774	27.13%	39,711
Washington	3,479	66.44%	1,724	32.93%	33	0.63%	1,755	33.51%	5,236
Wayne	5,027	65.41%	2,616	34.04%	42	0.54%	2,411	31.37%	7,685
Webster	3,207	57.82%	2,304	41.54%	36	0.65%	903	16.28%	5,547
Whitley	9,559	70.14%	3,985	29.24%	85	0.62%	5,574	40.90%	13,629
Wolfe	1,385	43.90%	1,744	55.28%	26	0.82%	-359	-11.38%	3,155
Woodford	6,937	60.31%	4,480	38.95%	85	0.74%	2,457	21.36%	11,502
Totals	1,069,439	59.54%	712,733	39.68%	13,907	0.77%	356,706	19.86%	1,796,079

==== Counties that flipped from Democratic to Republican ====
- Ballard (largest city: LaCenter)
- Boyd (largest city: Ashland)
- Franklin (largest city: Frankfort)
- Fulton (largest city: Fulton)
- Harlan (largest city: Cumberland)
- Henderson (largest city: Henderson)
- Letcher (largest city: Jenkins)
- Muhlenberg (largest city: Central City)
- Perry (largest city: Hazard)

==== Counties that flipped from Republican to Democratic ====
- Bath (largest city: Owingsville)
- Carter (largest city: Grayson)
- Magoffin (largest city: Salyersville)
- Menifee (largest city: Frenchburg)
- Rowan (largest city: Morehead)
- Wolfe (largest city: Campton)

=== By congressional district ===
Bush won five of six congressional districts. Both candidates won a district held by the other party.

District	Bush	Kerry	Representative
1st	63%	36%	Ed Whitfield
2nd	65%	34%	Ron Lewis
3rd	49%	51%	Anne Northup
4th	63%	36%	Geoff Davis
5th	61%	39%	Hal Rogers
6th	58%	41%	Ben Chandler

== Electors ==
Technically the voters of Kentucky cast their ballots for electors: representatives to the Electoral College. Kentucky is allocated eight electors because it has six congressional districts and two senators. All candidates who appear on the ballot or qualify to receive write-in votes must submit a list of eight electors, who pledge to vote for their candidate and his or her running mate. Whoever wins the majority of votes in the state is awarded all eight electoral votes. Their chosen electors then vote for president and vice president. Although electors are pledged to their candidate and running mate, they are not obligated to vote for them. An elector who votes for someone other than his or her candidate is known as a faithless elector.

The electors of each state and the District of Columbia met on December 13, 2004, to cast their votes for president and vice president. The Electoral College itself never meets as one body. Instead, the electors from each state and the District of Columbia met in their respective capitols.

The following were the members of the Electoral College from the state. All eight were pledged to Bush/Cheney:

1. Rachel N. McCubbin
2. Keith A. Hall
3. Carolyn Cole
4. Martha G. Prewitt
5. Donald E. Girdler
6. Constance M. Gray
7. Frank Schwendeman
8. Carla T. Bartleman
