= 2004 United States presidential election in Oregon =

- November 2, 2004
- Turnout: 68%

Nominee	John Kerry	George W. Bush
Party	Democratic	Republican
Home state	Massachusetts	Texas
Running mate	John Edwards	Dick Cheney
Electoral vote	7	0
Popular vote	943,163	866,831
Percentage	51.35%	47.19%

Kerry
40–50%
50–60%
60–70%
70–80%
Bush
50–60%
60–70%
70–80%
President before election
George W. Bush
Republican
Elected President
George W. Bush
Republican

The 2004 United States presidential election in Oregon took place on November 2, 2004, and was part of the 2004 United States presidential election. Voters chose seven representatives, or electors, to the Electoral College, who voted for president and vice president.

Oregon was won by Democratic Party nominee John Kerry by 4.16 points. Prior to the election, news organizations considered the state a tossup or leaning Kerry. A moderate amount of campaigning took place here, as Kerry was ahead in every poll after October 14, each with between 47% and 53% of the vote. Though the state had been very competitive and barely carried by Al Gore four years earlier, Oregon is considered a blue state as no Republican presidential candidate has won it since Ronald Reagan in 1984. While larger than Gore's, Kerry's margin of victory in Oregon was relatively modest. This is the most recent presidential election in which Oregon was considered a swing state.

As of the 2024 presidential election, this is the most recent election in which Clackamas County voted for a Republican presidential candidate, as well as the most recent time the state's margin would be in the single digits, and the latest presidential election in which a Republican received more than 45% of the state's vote. Bush would win re-election nationwide in 2004, the first time in history that a Republican had been elected twice as president without ever carrying Oregon.

== Primaries ==
- 2004 Oregon Democratic presidential primary
- 2004 Oregon Republican presidential primary

== Campaign ==
=== Predictions ===
There were 12 news organizations who made state-by-state predictions of the election. Here are their last predictions before election day.

Source	Ranking
D.C. Political Report	Lean D
Associated Press	Toss-up
CNN	Likely D
Cook Political Report	Lean D
Newsweek	Lean D
New York Times	Lean D
Rasmussen Reports	Likely D
Research 2000	Solid D
Washington Post	Toss-up
Washington Times	Toss-up
Zogby International	Likely D
Washington Dispatch	Likely D

=== Polling ===
Kerry won most pre-election polling. The final 3 poll average had Kerry leading 50% to 45% for Bush.

=== Fundraising ===
Bush raised $1,497,451. Kerry raised $1,937,916.

=== Advertising and visits ===
In the week of September 28, both tickets combined spent an estimated $546,000 on advertising. However, both tickets spent less and less money each week. Bush visited here 2 times. Kerry visited here 3 times. Both tickets visited the western part of the state.

== Analysis ==
After the 2000 election, which saw a particularly close race, Oregon was largely considered a potential Republican target. However, Democratic presidential candidate John Kerry won 51% of Oregon's vote, narrowly defeating Republican incumbent George W. Bush. The rural and highly conservative eastern interior and Southern Oregon favored Bush, but Kerry's strong support in the more urban Willamette Valley allowed him to win the state. About 68% of the voting age population came out to vote.

== Results ==
2004 United States presidential election in Oregon
Party	Candidate	Votes	Percentage	Electoral votes
Democratic	John Kerry	943,163	51.35%	7
Republican	George W. Bush (incumbent)	866,831	47.19%	0
Write Ins		8,956	0.49%	0
Libertarian	Michael Badnarik	7,260	0.40%	0
Pacific Green	David Cobb	5,315	0.29%	0
Constitution	Michael Peroutka	5,257	0.29%	0
Totals		1,836,782	100.00%	7
Voter turnout (Voting age population)				67.8%

=== Results by county ===
County	John Kerry Democratic		George W. Bush Republican		Various candidates Other parties		Margin		Total votes cast
County	#	%	#	%	#	%	#	%	Total votes cast
Baker	2,616	28.96%	6,253	69.22%	165	1.83%	-3,637	-40.26%	9,034
Benton	26,515	57.98%	18,460	40.36%	760	1.67%	8,055	17.62%	45,735
Clackamas	95,129	48.78%	97,691	50.10%	2,180	1.12%	-2,562	-1.32%	195,000
Clatsop	10,461	54.18%	8,503	44.04%	345	1.79%	1,958	10.14%	19,309
Columbia	12,563	50.42%	11,868	47.63%	486	1.95%	695	2.79%	24,917
Coos	14,393	43.14%	18,291	54.83%	678	2.03%	-3,898	-11.69%	33,362
Crook	3,024	30.09%	6,830	67.95%	197	1.96%	-3,806	-37.86%	10,051
Curry	5,220	40.78%	7,332	57.29%	247	1.93%	-2,112	-16.51%	12,799
Deschutes	31,179	42.11%	41,757	56.39%	1,112	1.50%	-10,578	-14.28%	74,048
Douglas	18,089	32.90%	35,956	65.39%	939	1.71%	-17,867	-32.49%	54,984
Gilliam	370	32.51%	755	66.34%	13	1.14%	-385	-33.83%	1,138
Grant	780	19.21%	3,204	78.90%	77	1.90%	-2,424	-59.69%	4,061
Harney	839	22.66%	2,815	76.04%	48	1.30%	-1,976	-53.38%	3,702
Hood River	5,587	56.67%	4,124	41.83%	148	1.50%	1,463	14.84%	9,859
Jackson	44,366	43.42%	56,519	55.31%	1,304	1.28%	-12,153	-11.89%	102,189
Jefferson	3,243	39.96%	4,762	58.68%	110	1.36%	-1,519	-18.72%	8,115
Josephine	15,214	35.99%	26,241	62.07%	820	1.94%	-11,027	-26.08%	42,275
Klamath	8,264	26.22%	22,733	72.13%	518	1.64%	-14,469	-45.91%	31,515
Lake	802	20.54%	3,039	77.82%	64	1.64%	-2,237	-57.28%	3,905
Lane	107,769	57.98%	75,007	40.35%	3,096	1.67%	32,762	17.63%	185,872
Lincoln	13,753	56.54%	10,160	41.77%	412	1.69%	3,593	14.77%	24,325
Linn	19,940	38.32%	31,260	60.07%	841	1.62%	-11,320	-21.75%	52,041
Malheur	2,577	23.76%	8,123	74.89%	146	1.35%	-5,546	-51.13%	10,846
Marion	57,671	44.49%	69,900	53.93%	2,048	1.58%	-12,229	-9.44%	129,619
Morrow	1,361	32.80%	2,732	65.85%	56	1.35%	-1,371	-33.05%	4,149
Multnomah	259,585	71.57%	98,439	27.14%	4,670	1.29%	161,146	44.43%	362,694
Polk	15,484	43.63%	19,508	54.97%	497	1.40%	-4,024	-11.34%	35,489
Sherman	390	35.33%	694	62.86%	20	1.81%	-304	-27.53%	1,104
Tillamook	6,750	48.38%	7,003	50.20%	198	1.42%	-253	-1.82%	13,951
Umatilla	8,884	33.75%	17,068	64.84%	370	1.41%	-8,184	-31.09%	26,322
Union	4,428	32.75%	8,879	65.68%	212	1.57%	-4,451	-32.93%	13,519
Wallowa	1,269	28.07%	3,132	69.28%	120	2.65%	-1,863	-41.21%	4,521
Wasco	5,691	47.42%	6,119	50.98%	192	1.60%	-428	-3.56%	12,002
Washington	121,140	52.37%	107,223	46.36%	2,945	1.27%	13,917	6.01%	231,308
Wheeler	245	27.84%	612	69.55%	23	2.61%	-367	-41.71%	880
Yamhill	17,572	41.70%	23,839	56.57%	731	1.73%	-6,267	-14.87%	42,142
Totals	943,163	51.35%	866,831	47.19%	26,788	1.46%	76,332	4.16%	1,836,782

=== By congressional district ===
Kerry won three of five congressional districts. Bush won two, including one held by a Democrat.

District	Kerry	Bush	Representative
1st	55%	44%	David Wu
2nd	38%	61%	Greg Walden
3rd	67%	33%	Earl Blumenauer
4th	49%	49%	Peter DeFazio
5th	49%	50%	Darlene Hooley

== Electors ==
Technically the voters of Oregon cast their ballots for electors: representatives to the Electoral College. Oregon is allocated 7 electors because it has 5 congressional districts and 2 senators. All candidates who appear on the ballot or qualify to receive write-in votes must submit a list of 7 electors, who pledge to vote for their candidate and his or her running mate. Whoever wins the majority of votes in the state is awarded all 7 electoral votes. Their chosen electors then vote for president and vice president. Although electors are pledged to their candidate and running mate, they are not obligated to vote for them. An elector who votes for someone other than his or her candidate is known as a faithless elector.

The electors of each state and the District of Columbia met on December 13, 2004, to cast their votes for president and vice president. The Electoral College itself never meets as one body. Instead the electors from each state and the District of Columbia met in their respective capitols.

The following were the members of the Electoral College from the state. All seven were pledged for Kerry/Edwards.

1. Michael J. Bohan
2. Shirley A. Cairns
3. James L. Edmunson
4. Moshe D. Lenske
5. Meredith Wood Smith
6. Judy A. Sugnet
7. Paul F. Zastrow

== See also ==
- United States presidential elections in Oregon
- Presidency of George W. Bush
