= 2004 Arkansas Republican presidential primary =

- May 18, 2004

35 delegate to the 2004 Republican National Convention

Candidate	George W. Bush	Uncommitted (voting option)
Home state	Texas
Delegate count	35
Popular vote	37,234	1,129
Percentage	97.1%	2.9%

The 2004 Arkansas Republican presidential primary was held on May 18, 2004, as part of the 2004 Republican Party primaries for the 2004 presidential election. 35 delegates to the 2004 Republican National Convention were allocated to the presidential candidates. The contest was held alongside primaries in Kentucky and Oregon.

Incumbent President George W. Bush won 35 delegates won this contest.

== Candidates ==
The following candidates achieved on the ballot:

- Incumbent President George W. Bush
- Uncommitted (voting option)

== Results ==
Incumbent President George W. Bush won the primary with no majority candidate, he received 37,234 popular votes (97.1%) from the state of Arkansas and 35 delegates to the 2004 Republican National Convention. Uncommitted received only 1,129 popular votes (2.9%). Bush continued to win, this was also one of the highest results by popular votes in the 2004 Republican primaries.

Arkansas Republican primary, May 18, 2004
Candidate	Votes	Percentage	Actual delegate count		
Candidate	Votes	Percentage	Bound	Unbound	Total
George W. Bush	37,234	97.1%	35		35
Uncommitted (voting option)	1,129	2.9%			
Total:	38,363	100.00%	35		35

== See also ==
- 2004 Arkansas Democratic presidential primary
- 2004 United States presidential election
- 2004 Republican Party presidential primaries
- 2004 United States presidential election in Arkansas
- 2004 Democratic Party presidential primaries
