= 2004 Rhode Island Republican presidential primary =

- March 2, 2004

21 delegate to the 2004 Republican National Convention

Candidate	George W. Bush	Uncommitted (voting option)
Home state	Texas
Delegate count	18
Popular vote	2,152	314
Percentage	84.9%	12.4%

The 2004 Rhode Island Republican presidential primary was held on March 2, 2004, as part of the 2004 Republican Party primaries for the 2004 presidential election. 18 delegates to the 2004 Republican National Convention were allocated to the presidential candidates.

The contest was along with Massachusetts and also with Super Tuesday but there were only two primaries there, called Mini-Tuesday.

== Background ==
In the 2000 primaries, George W. Bush lost to John McCain by 25 delegates to McCain.

== Candidates ==
The following candidates were on the ballot:

- President George W. Bush
- Uncommitted (voting option)
- Write-in candidate

== Results ==
Incumbent President George W. Bush won by a total of 18 delegates to the 2004 Republican National Convention and 2,152 popular votes (84.9%) from the state of Rhode Island, Uncommitted received 314 popular votes (12.4%) and finally Write-in candidate received 69 popular votes (2.7%), Bush continued to win.

Results:

Rhode Island Republican primary, March 2, 2004
Candidate	Votes	Percentage	Actual delegate count		
Candidate	Votes	Percentage	Bound	Unbound	Total
George W. Bush	2,152	84.9%	18		18
Uncommitted (voting option)	314	12.4%			
Write-in candidate	69	2.7%			
Total:	2,535	100.00%	18		18

== See also ==
- 2004 Democratic Party presidential primaries
- 2004 Rhode Island Democratic presidential primary
- 2004 United States presidential election
- 2004 United States presidential election in Rhode Island
