= 2004 United States presidential primaries =

The 2004 United States presidential primaries can refer to:

- 2004 Democratic Party presidential primaries
- 2004 Republican Party presidential primaries
