= 2004 United States presidential election in Arizona =

- November 2, 2004
- Turnout: 76.3% (of registered voters); 49.6% (of voting age population)

Nominee	George W. Bush	John Kerry
Party	Republican	Democratic
Home state	Texas	Massachusetts
Running mate	Dick Cheney	John Edwards
Electoral vote	10	0
Popular vote	1,104,294	893,524
Percentage	54.77%	44.32%

Bush
50–60%
60–70%
Kerry
50–60%
60–70%
President before election
George W. Bush
Republican
Elected President
George W. Bush
Republican

The 2004 United States presidential election in Arizona took place on November 2, 2004, and was part of the 2004 United States presidential election. Voters chose 10 representatives, or electors, to the Electoral College, who voted for president and vice president.

Arizona was won by incumbent George W. Bush by 10.5%. Prior to the election, 12 news organizations considered this a state Bush would win, or otherwise considered as a likely red state. Neither major party tickets campaigned here in the fall election. Arizona hosted the third presidential debate on October 13, 2004, in the city of Tempe.

As of the 2024 presidential election, this is the last time Arizona was won by a double-digit margin of victory. This was the first election in which any candidate won more than a million votes as well as in which Maricopa County cast more than a million ballots.

== Primaries ==
- 2004 Arizona Democratic primary

== Campaign ==
=== Predictions ===
There were 12 news organizations who made state-by-state predictions of the election. Here are their last predictions before election day.

Source	Ranking
D.C. Political Report	Solid R
Associated Press	Lean R
CNN	Likely R
Cook Political Report	Likely R
Newsweek	Solid R
New York Times	Lean R
Rasmussen Reports	Likely R
Research 2000	Solid R
Washington Post	Likely R
Washington Times	Lean R
Zogby International	Likely R
Washington Dispatch	Likely R

=== Polling ===
Throughout several polls taken in the state in 2004, just one showed Kerry leading. The final 3 pre-election polls showed that Bush was leading with 51% to Kerry's 43%.

=== Fundraising ===
Bush raised $3,196,692. Kerry raised $1,525,930.

=== Advertising and visits ===
Neither campaign advertised or visited this state during the fall campaign.

== Analysis ==
The exit polls showed that Bush was going to be the clear winner of the state, based on the fact that Bush won among both genders. A major key factor was how 55% of the people thought the state economy was good, and 70% of those people voted for Bush. Also, 55% of the state approved of Bush.

The key to Bush's victory was winning the highly populated Maricopa County with almost 57%. However, Kerry did win portions of the state such as Arizona's 4th congressional district and Arizona's 7th congressional district and 4 counties. 50% of the voting age population came out to vote.

== Results ==
2004 United States presidential election in Arizona
Party	Candidate	Votes	Percentage	Electoral votes
Republican	George W. Bush (incumbent)	1,104,294	54.77%	10
Democratic	John Kerry	893,524	44.32%	0
Libertarian	Michael Badnarik	11,856	0.59%	0
Write In	Write-in candidate	3,517	0.17%	0
Write In	Ralph Nader	2,773	0.14%	0
Write In	David Cobb	138	0.01%	0
Totals		2,012,585	100.00%	10
Voter turnout (voting age)				49.6%

=== By county ===
County	George W. Bush Republican		John Kerry Democratic		Various candidates Other parties		Margin		Total votes cast
County	#	%	#	%	#	%	#	%	Total votes cast
Apache	8,384	34.65%	15,658	64.71%	156	0.64%	−7,274	−30.06%	24,198
Cochise	26,556	59.55%	17,514	39.27%	525	1.18%	9,042	20.28%	44,595
Coconino	22,526	43.00%	29,243	55.82%	622	1.18%	−6,717	−12.82%	52,391
Gila	12,343	59.12%	8,314	39.82%	220	1.06%	4,029	19.30%	20,877
Graham	7,467	69.65%	3,185	29.71%	68	0.64%	4,282	39.94%	10,720
Greenlee	1,899	61.92%	1,146	37.37%	22	0.71%	753	24.55%	3,067
La Paz	3,158	62.42%	1,849	36.55%	52	1.03%	1,309	25.87%	5,059
Maricopa	679,455	56.86%	504,849	42.25%	10,657	0.89%	174,606	14.61%	1,194,961
Mohave	36,794	63.53%	20,503	35.40%	618	1.07%	16,291	28.13%	57,915
Navajo	17,277	53.32%	14,815	45.72%	312	0.96%	2,462	7.60%	32,404
Pima	171,109	46.56%	193,128	52.55%	3,255	0.89%	−22,019	−5.99%	367,492
Pinal	37,006	57.27%	27,252	42.17%	364	0.56%	9,754	15.10%	64,622
Santa Cruz	4,668	39.93%	6,909	59.11%	112	0.96%	−2,241	−19.18%	11,689
Yavapai	53,468	61.05%	33,127	37.82%	988	1.13%	20,341	23.23%	87,583
Yuma	22,184	57.58%	16,032	41.61%	313	0.81%	6,152	15.97%	38,529
Totals	1,104,294	54.77%	893,524	44.32%	18,284	0.91%	210,770	10.45%	2,016,102

=== By congressional district ===
Bush won six of eight congressional districts.

District	Bush	Kerry	Representative
1st	54%	46%	Rick Renzi
2nd	61%	38%	Trent Franks
3rd	58%	41%	John Shadegg
4th	38%	62%	Ed Pastor
5th	54%	45%	J. D. Hayworth
6th	64%	35%	Jeff Flake
7th	43%	57%	Raul Grijalva
8th	53%	46%	Jim Kolbe

== Electors ==
Technically the voters of Arizona cast their ballots for electors: representatives to the Electoral College. Arizona is allocated 10 electors because it has 8 congressional districts and 2 senators. All candidates who appear on the ballot or qualify to receive write-in votes must submit a list of 10 electors, who pledge to vote for their candidate and their running mate. Whoever wins the majority of votes in the state is awarded all 10 electoral votes. Their chosen electors then vote for president and vice president. Although electors are pledged to their candidate and running mate, they are not obligated to vote for them. An elector who votes for someone other than their candidate is known as a faithless elector.

The electors of each state and the District of Columbia met on December 13, 2004, to cast their votes for president and vice president. The Electoral College itself never meets as one body. Instead the electors from each state and the District of Columbia met in their respective capitols.

The following were the members of the Electoral College from this state. All were pledged to and voted for George W. Bush and Dick Cheney.

1. Linda Barber
2. Malcolm Barrett
3. Jim Click
4. Cynthia J. Collins
5. Webb Crockett
6. Elizabeth Wilkinson Fannin
7. Ross Farnsworth
8. Ira A. Fulton
9. Bernice C. Roberts
10. Phillip Townsend
