= 2004 Illinois Republican presidential primary =

- March 16, 2004

73 Republican National Convention delegates (60 pledged, 13 unpledged) Pledged delegates directly-elected in vote separate from statewide presidential preference vote
Candidate	George W. Bush
Home state	Texas
Delegate count	60
Popular vote	583,575
Percentage	100%
- George W. Bush

The 2004 Illinois Republican presidential primary was held on March 16 in the U.S. state of Illinois as one of the Republican Party's state primaries ahead of the 2004 presidential election. 73 delegates to the 2004 Republican National Convention were allocated to the presidential candidates.

Incumbent President George W. Bush won the primary. Bush was running for reelection without any major opponents, and no other candidates were listed on the ballot in Illinois.

== Procedure ==
Illinois assigned 60 of its 73 delegates to be directly elected. The Illinois primary was a so-called "loophole" primary, in which delegates were assigned by direct-level voting on delegate candidates whose proclaimed presidential preferences were listed beside their names on the ballot (as opposed to be assigned based upon the performance of a candidate in the presidential preference vote).

Congressional districts were allocated delegates based on the extent of the district's support for Bush in the 2000 presidential general election. Thus, Illinois's 6th, 8th, 10th, 11th, 13th, 14th, 15th, 16th, 18th, and 19th congressional districts each received four delegates, the 12th and 17th congressional districts each received three delegates, and the 1st, 2nd, 3rd, 4th, 5th, 7th, and 9th congressional districts each received two delegates.

Of the remaining thirteen unpledged delegates, ten were selected at the Illinois Republican Party Convention, while the other three consisted of the Illinois Republican Party's National Committeeman, National Committeewoman, and Chairman.

== Results ==
Since incumbent George W. Bush was the only candidate contesting the Republican nomination for President of the United States and faced no major opponents, he received 100% of the popular vote, winning all 60 directly-elected delegates to the Republican National Convention.

2004 Illinois Republican presidential primary
Candidate	Votes	Percentage	Delegates
George W. Bush (incumbent)	583,575	100%	60
Totals	583,575	100%	60

== See also ==
- 2004 Illinois Democratic presidential primary
- 2004 United States presidential election in Illinois
- 2004 Republican Party presidential primaries
