= 2004 United States presidential election in Rhode Island =

- November 2, 2004
- Turnout: 62.1% ▲0.7 pp

| Nominee | John Kerry | George W. Bush |
| Party | Democratic | Republican |
| Home state | Massachusetts | Texas |
| Running mate | John Edwards | Dick Cheney |
| Electoral vote | 4 | 0 |
| Popular vote | 259,760 | 169,046 |
| Percentage | 59.42% | 38.67% |

Kerry
40–50%
50–60%
60–70%
70–80%
Bush
50–60%
President before election
George W. Bush
Republican
Elected President
George W. Bush
Republican

The 2004 United States presidential election in Rhode Island took place on November 2, 2004, and was part of the 2004 United States presidential election. Voters chose four representatives, or electors, to the Electoral College, who voted for president and vice president.

Rhode Island was won by Democratic nominee John Kerry by a 20.75% margin of victory. Prior to the election, all 12 news organizations considered this a state Kerry would win, or otherwise considered as a safe blue state. Even though President George W. Bush fared better than he had in four years earlier, he was overwhelmingly defeated in a traditional Democratic stronghold, winning only 38% of the vote to 59% for Kerry.

== Primaries ==
- 2004 Rhode Island Democratic presidential primary
- 2004 Rhode Island Republican presidential primary

== Campaign ==
=== Predictions ===
There were 12 news organizations who made state-by-state predictions of the election. Here are their last predictions before election day.

| Source | Ranking |
|---|---|
| D.C. Political Report | Solid D |
| Cook Political Report | Solid D |
| Research 2000 | Solid D |
| Zogby International | Likely D |
| Washington Post | Solid D |
| Washington Dispatch | Likely D |
| Washington Times | Solid D |
| The New York Times | Solid D |
| CNN | Solid D |
| Newsweek | Solid D |
| Associated Press | Solid D |
| Rasmussen Reports | Solid D |

=== Polling ===
Kerry won every single pre-election poll, each with a double-digit margin and with at least 49% of the vote. The final three polls' average showed Kerry leading 55% to 38%.

=== Fundraising ===
Bush raised $282,237. Kerry raised $977,390.

=== Advertising and visits ===
Neither campaign advertised or visited here in the fall campaign.

== Analysis ==
Federally, Rhode Island is one of the most reliably Democratic states during presidential elections, regularly giving the Democratic nominees one of their best showings. In 1980, Rhode Island was one of only six states to vote against Ronald Reagan. Reagan did carry Rhode Island in his 49-state victory in 1984, but the state was the second weakest of the states Reagan won. Rhode Island was the Democrats' leading state in 1988 and 2000, and second-best in 1996 and 2004.

Historically, the state was devoted to Republicans until 1908, but has only strayed from the Democrats seven times in the 24 elections that have followed. In 2004, Rhode Island gave John Kerry more than a 20% margin of victory (the third-highest of any state), with 59.4% of its vote. All but three of Rhode Island's 39 cities and towns voted for the Democratic candidate. The only exceptions were East Greenwich, West Greenwich and Scituate.

Having some of the highest taxes in the nation, Rhode Island is considered to be a liberal bastion. In addition, Rhode Island has abolished capital punishment, making it one of 15 states that have done so. Rhode Island abolished the death penalty very early, just after Michigan (the first state to abolish it), and carried out its last execution in the 1840s.

== Results ==
2004 United States presidential election in Rhode Island
| Party | Candidate | Votes | Percentage | Electoral votes |
|---|---|---|---|---|
| Democratic | John Kerry | 259,760 | 59.42% | 4 |
| Republican | George W. Bush (incumbent) | 169,046 | 38.67% | 0 |
| Reform | Ralph Nader | 4,651 | 1.06% | 0 |
| Green | David Cobb | 1,333 | 0.30% | 0 |
| Libertarian | Michael Badnarik | 907 | 0.21% | 0 |
| Independent | Write Ins | 840 | 0.21% | 0 |
| Constitution | Michael Peroutka | 339 | 0.08% | 0 |
| Workers World | John Parker | 253 | 0.06% | 0 |

=== By county ===
| County | John Kerry Democratic | | George W. Bush Republican | | Various candidates Other parties | | Margin | | Total votes cast |
| County | # | % | # | % | # | % | # | % | Total votes cast |
|---|---|---|---|---|---|---|---|---|---|
| Bristol | 14,448 | 58.42% | 9,855 | 39.85% | 429 | 1.73% | 4,593 | 18.57% | 24,732 |
| Kent | 42,830 | 54.90% | 33,699 | 43.19% | 1,489 | 1.91% | 9,131 | 11.71% | 78,018 |
| Newport | 22,992 | 56.87% | 16,622 | 41.12% | 812 | 2.00% | 6,370 | 15.75% | 40,426 |
| Providence | 144,811 | 62.60% | 82,337 | 35.59% | 4,176 | 1.81% | 62,474 | 27.01% | 231,324 |
| Washington | 34,679 | 55.37% | 26,533 | 42.36% | 1,422 | 2.27% | 8,146 | 13.01% | 62,634 |
| Totals | 259,760 | 59.42% | 169,046 | 38.67% | 8,328 | 1.91% | 90,714 | 20.75% | 437,134 |

=== By congressional district ===
Kerry won both congressional districts.

| District | Bush | Kerry | Representative |
|---|---|---|---|
| 1st | 37% | 61% | Patrick J. Kennedy |
| 2nd | 41% | 57% | James Langevin |

== Electors ==
Technically the voters of Rhode Island cast their ballots for electors: representatives to the Electoral College. Rhode Island is allocated four electors because it has two congressional districts and two senators. All candidates who appear on the ballot or qualify to receive write-in votes must submit a list of four electors, who pledge to vote for their candidate and their running mate. Whoever wins the majority of votes in the state is awarded all four electoral votes. Their chosen electors then vote for president and vice president. Although electors are pledged to their candidate and running mate, they are not obligated to vote for them. An elector who votes for someone other than their candidate is known as a faithless elector.

The electors of each state and the District of Columbia met on December 13, 2004, to cast their votes for president and vice president. The Electoral College itself never meets as one body. Instead, the electors from each state and the District of Columbia met in their respective capitols.

The following were the members of the Electoral College from the state. All four were pledged for Kerry/Edwards.

1. Teresa Paiva-Weed
2. Elizabeth Dennigan
3. John C. Lynch
4. Mark Weiner

== See also ==
- United States presidential elections in Rhode Island
