= 2004 United States presidential election in Massachusetts =

- November 2, 2004
- Turnout: 71.41% (▲3.21)

Nominee	John Kerry	George W. Bush
Party	Democratic	Republican
Home state	Massachusetts	Texas
Running mate	John Edwards	Dick Cheney
Electoral vote	12	0
Popular vote	1,803,800	1,071,109
Percentage	61.94%	36.78%

Kerry
40–50%
50–60%
60–70%
70–80%
80–90%
90–100%
Bush
40–50%
50–60%
60–70%
President before election
George W. Bush
Republican
Elected President
George W. Bush
Republican

The 2004 United States presidential election in Massachusetts took place on November 2, 2004, and was part of the 2004 United States presidential election. Voters chose 12 representatives, or electors, to the Electoral College, who voted for president and vice president.

Massachusetts was won by Democratic nominee and its U.S. Senator John Kerry by a 25.2% margin of victory. Kerry took 61.94% of the vote to Republican George W. Bush's 36.78%. Prior to the election, all 12 news organizations considered this a state Kerry would win, or otherwise considered as a safe blue state. Kerry's vote share was later surpassed by Joe Biden in 2020, who won 65.60% of the vote that year.

Massachusetts had been a Democratic-leaning state since 1928, and a Democratic stronghold since 1960, and has kept up its intense level of the sizable Democratic margins since 1996. No Republican has won even a single Massachusetts county or congressional district in a presidential election since Bush's father George H. W. Bush in 1988, and no Republican has won statewide since Ronald Reagan's landslide victory in 1984. In the 2004 presidential election it was also the home state of Democratic candidate John Kerry, who at the time represented Massachusetts in the U.S. Senate.

Massachusetts weighed in as about 27% more Democratic than the national average in 2004, making it the most Democratic state in the union, and the only state where Kerry won with more than 60% of the vote.

To date, this is the last election where the towns of Orange, and Webster backed the national losing candidate, and the last time a Democrat won the towns of Dracut, Halifax, Hanson, Millville, and Rochester.

== Primaries ==
- 2004 Massachusetts Democratic presidential primary
- 2004 Massachusetts Republican presidential primary

== Campaign ==
=== Predictions ===
There were 12 news organizations who made state-by-state predictions of the election. Here are their last predictions before election day.

Source	Ranking
D.C. Political Report	Solid D
Cook Political Report	Solid D
Research 2000	Solid D
Zogby International	Likely D
Washington Post	Solid D
Washington Dispatch	Likely D
Washington Times	Solid D
The New York Times	Solid D
CNN	Solid D
Newsweek	Solid D
Associated Press	Solid D
Rasmussen Reports	Solid D

=== Polling ===
Kerry won every pre-election poll, and each with a double-digit margin and with at least 50% of the vote. The final three polls' average showed Kerry with a strong lead of 57% to 31%.

=== Fundraising ===
Bush raised $4,060,356. Kerry raised $18,565,872, which was 10% of all the money he raised in 2004, and the third highest amount below only New York and California.

=== Advertising and visits ===
Neither campaign advertised or visited this state during the fall election.

== Analysis ==
Massachusetts was (and is) one of the bluest states in the nation. It has voted for the Democratic presidential nominee in every election since 1960 except for Ronald Reagan's landslide victories of 1980 and 1984. In 1972, only Massachusetts and the District of Columbia voted for Democratic U.S. Senator George McGovern as Republican Richard M. Nixon won reelection.

Kerry defeated George W. Bush in Massachusetts by 25%, a similar margin to that of Al Gore in 2000. He won every county and Congressional district easily. The 2004 Democratic National Convention took place at the TD Banknorth Garden, then called FleetCenter in Boston, the state capital.

== Results ==
2004 United States presidential election in Massachusetts
Party	Candidate	Votes	Percentage	Electoral votes
Democratic	John Kerry	1,803,800	61.94%	12
Republican	George W. Bush (incumbent)	1,071,109	36.78%	0
Libertarian	Michael Badnarik	15,022	0.52%	0
Green-Rainbow	David Cobb	10,623	0.36%	0
Independent	Others (Write-In)	7,028	0.24%	0
Independent	Ralph Nader (Write-In)	4,806	0.17%	0
Total votes		2,912,388	100.00%	12

=== By county ===
County	John Kerry Democratic		George W. Bush Republican		Various candidates Other parties		Margin		Total votes cast
County	#	%	#	%	#	%	#	%	Total votes cast
Barnstable	72,156	54.60%	58,527	44.29%	1,465	1.11%	13,629	10.31%	132,148
Berkshire	47,743	73.12%	16,806	25.74%	742	1.13%	30,937	47.38%	65,291
Bristol	147,854	63.49%	82,524	35.44%	2,500	1.07%	65,330	28.05%	232,878
Dukes	7,265	72.67%	2,602	26.03%	130	1.30%	4,663	46.64%	9,997
Essex	194,068	58.24%	135,114	40.55%	4,051	1.41%	58,954	17.69%	333,233
Franklin	25,550	68.35%	11,058	29.58%	773	2.07%	14,492	38.77%	37,381
Hampden	113,710	60.93%	70,925	38.00%	2,004	1.07%	42,785	22.93%	186,639
Hampshire	51,680	69.44%	21,315	28.64%	1,427	1.91%	30,365	40.80%	74,422
Middlesex	440,862	63.99%	237,815	34.52%	10,283	1.49%	203,047	29.47%	688,960
Nantucket	3,608	63.03%	2,040	35.64%	76	1.32%	1,568	27.39%	5,724
Norfolk	199,392	60.21%	127,763	38.58%	3,982	1.21%	71,629	21.63%	331,137
Plymouth	125,178	53.66%	105,603	45.27%	2,516	1.08%	19,575	8.39%	233,297
Suffolk	182,592	75.88%	54,923	22.82%	3,130	1.30%	127,669	53.06%	240,645
Worcester	192,142	56.41%	144,094	42.30%	4,400	1.29%	48,048	14.11%	340,636
Totals	1,803,800	61.94%	1,071,109	36.78%	37,479	1.28%	732,691	25.16%	2,912,388

=== By congressional district ===
Kerry won all ten congressional districts.

District	Bush	Kerry	Representative
1st	35%	63%	John Olver
2nd	40%	59%	Richard Neal
3rd	40%	59%	Jim McGovern
4th	33%	65%	Barney Frank
5th	41%	57%	Marty Meehan
6th	41%	58%	John Tierney
7th	33%	66%	Ed Markey
8th	19%	79%	Mike Capuano
9th	36%	63%	Stephen Lynch
10th	43%	56%	William Delahunt

== Electors ==
Technically the voters of Massachusetts cast their ballots for electors: representatives to the Electoral College. Massachusetts is allocated 12 electors because it has 10 congressional districts and two senators. All candidates who appear on the ballot or qualify to receive write-in votes must submit a list of 12 electors, who pledge to vote for their candidate and their running mate. Whoever wins the majority of votes in the state is awarded all 12 electoral votes. Their chosen electors then vote for president and vice president. Although electors are pledged to their candidate and running mate, they are not obligated to vote for them. An elector who votes for someone other than their candidate is known as a faithless elector.

The electors of each state and the District of Columbia met on December 13, 2004, to cast their votes for president and vice president. The Electoral College itself never meets as one body. Instead, the electors from each state and the District of Columbia met in their respective capitols.

The following were the members of the Electoral College from the state. All 12 were pledged for Kerry/Edwards:

1. Cathaleen L. Ashton
2. Sharon M. Pollard
3. Elizabeth Moroney
4. Helen Covington
5. Candice E. Lopes
6. Susan Thomson
7. Robert P. Cassidy
8. William P. Dooling
9. William Eddy
10. Thomas V. Barbera
11. Mushtaque A. Minza
12. Calvin T. Brown

== See also ==
- United States presidential elections in Massachusetts
