= 2004 Oklahoma Republican presidential primary =

- February 3, 2004

41 Republican National Convention delegates The number of delegates received is determined by the popular vote

Candidate	George W. Bush	Bill Wyatt
Home state	Texas	California
Delegate count	41	0
Popular vote	59,577	6,621
Percentage	90.0%	10.0%
- County results Bush: 80–85% 85–90% 90–95% 95–100%

The 2004 Oklahoma Republican presidential primary was held on February 3 in the U.S. state of Oklahoma as one of the Republican Party's statewide nomination contests ahead of the 2004 presidential election. Incumbent President George W. Bush easily won the primary with 90% of the vote against his only opponent on the ballot, Bill Wyatt, who unexpectedly won 10% of the vote.

== Results ==
2004 Oklahoma Republican presidential primary
Candidate	Votes	%	Delegates
George W. Bush (incumbent)	59,577	90.00%	41
Bill Wyatt	6,635	10.00%	
Total	66,198	100%	41

=== Results by county ===
2004 Oklahoma Republican presidential primary (results by county)
County	George W. Bush		Bill Wyatt		Total votes cast
County	Votes	%	Votes	%	Total votes cast
Adair	192	90.14%	21	9.86%	213
Alfalfa	338	91.35%	32	8.65%	370
Atoka	66	97.06%	2	2.94%	68
Beaver	153	95.63%	7	4.38%	160
Beckham	233	92.83%	18	7.17%	251
Blaine	348	89.46%	41	10.54%	389
Bryan	146	94.19%	9	5.81%	155
Caddo	278	87.97%	38	12.03%	316
Canadian	2,059	92.50%	167	7.50%	2,226
Carter	345	93.50%	24	6.50%	369
Cherokee	432	89.44%	51	10.56%	483
Choctaw	61	95.31%	3	4.69%	64
Cimarron	182	96.81%	6	3.19%	188
Cleveland	3,406	90.42%	361	9.58%	3,767
Coal	44	93.62%	3	6.38%	47
Comanche	1,168	90.19%	127	9.81%	1,295
Cotton	39	95.12%	2	4.88%	41
Craig	215	89.21%	26	10.79%	241
Creek	864	84.05%	164	15.95%	1,028
Custer	381	92.93%	29	7.07%	410
Delaware	545	86.92%	82	13.08%	627
Dewey	174	93.55%	12	6.45%	186
Ellis	200	94.79%	11	5.21%	211
Garfield	1,845	91.43%	173	8.57%	2,018
Garvin	263	87.96%	36	12.04%	299
Grady	610	90.64%	63	9.36%	673
Grant	216	90.38%	23	9.62%	239
Greer	55	85.94%	9	14.06%	64
Harmon	18	90.00%	2	10.00%	20
Harper	145	95.39%	7	4.61%	152
Haskell	58	89.23%	7	10.77%	65
Hughes	85	90.43%	9	9.57%	94
Jackson	270	93.43%	19	6.57%	289
Jefferson	29	90.63%	3	9.38%	32
Johnston	62	100%	0	0%	62
Kay	1,156	87.58%	164	12.42%	1,320
Kingfisher	578	94.14%	36	5.86%	614
Kiowa	114	91.20%	11	8.80%	125
Latimer	39	90.70%	4	9.30%	43
LeFlore	201	89.73%	23	10.27%	224
Lincoln	614	89.11%	75	10.89%	689
Logan	745	88.06%	101	11.94%	846
Love	65	85.53%	11	14.47%	76
McClain	467	94.53%	27	5.47%	494
McCurtain	132	96.35%	5	3.65%	137
McIntosh	141	89.81%	16	10.19%	157
Major	383	94.57%	22	5.43%	405
Marshall	77	96.25%	3	3.75%	80
Mayes	456	83.98%	87	16.02%	543
Murray	89	86.41%	14	13.59%	103
Muskogee	488	91.04%	48	8.96%	536
Noble	331	89.22%	40	10.78%	371
Nowata	151	80.32%	37	19.68%	188
Okfuskee	118	92.19%	10	7.81%	128
Oklahoma	11,215	91.78%	1,005	8.22%	12,220
Okmulgee	344	86.00%	56	14.00%	400
Osage	683	87.90%	94	12.10%	777
Ottawa	235	88.35%	31	11.65%	266
Pawnee	304	86.61%	47	13.39%	351
Payne	1,200	89.75%	137	10.25%	1,337
Pittsburg	409	93.59%	28	6.41%	437
Pontotoc	403	93.29%	29	6.71%	432
Pottawatomie	709	90.55%	74	9.45%	783
Pushmataha	47	95.92%	2	4.08%	49
Roger Mills	68	95.77%	3	4.23%	71
Rogers	1,159	86.75%	177	13.25%	1,336
Seminole	251	88.69%	32	11.31%	283
Sequoyah	192	89.30%	23	10.70%	215
Stephens	731	93.72%	49	6.28%	780
Texas	342	95.26%	17	4.74%	359
Tillman	82	96.47%	3	3.53%	85
Tulsa	16,099	88.52%	2,088	11.48%	18,187
Wagoner	887	86.62%	137	13.38%	1,024
Washington	1,421	88.21%	190	11.79%	1,611
Washita	157	86.26%	25	13.74%	182
Woods	296	91.93%	26	8.07%	322
Woodward	473	94.60%	27	5.40%	500
Total	59,577	90.00%	6,621	10.00%	66,198

== See also ==
- 2004 Oklahoma Democratic presidential primary
- 2004 Republican Party presidential primaries
