= 2004 Alabama Republican presidential primary =

- June 1, 2004

45 pledged delegates to the; 2004 Republican National Convention

Candidate	George W. Bush	Uncommitted
Home state	Texas	n/a
Delegate count	45	0
Popular vote	187,038	14,449
Percentage	92.83%	7.17%
- Primary results by county Bush: 85% 90% 95%

The 2004 Alabama Republican presidential primary was held on June 1, 2004, to choose the state's 45 pledged delegates to the 2004 Republican National Convention.

Incumbent president George W. Bush won the primary and all of the state's delegates.

== Procedure ==
Alabama was allocated 48 delegates to the Republican National Convention: 45 were allocated based on the results of the primary, with the other three being unpledged superdelegates.

Of the 45 pledged delegates, 21 were assigned to the state's seven congressional districts, with three delegates per district. A candidate would win all the delegates in a congressional district if they won a majority of the vote, or if no other candidate earned at least 15% of the vote. If the candidate with the most votes in a congressional district won less than 50% of the vote and the second-place candidate won at least 15%, the candidate with the most votes would be awarded two delegates, with the remaining delegate being allotted to the runner-up.

24 of the state's delegates were allocated proportionally based on the popular vote statewide. A candidate had to receive at least 15% of the vote to qualify for delegates.

== Results ==
2004 Alabama Republican presidential primary
Candidate	Votes	%	Delegates
George W. Bush	187,038	92.83%	45
Uncommitted	14,449	7.17%	
Total	201,487	100%	45

=== Results by county ===
2004 Alabama Republican presidential primary (results by county)
County	George W. Bush		Uncommitted		Total votes cast
County	Votes	%	Votes	%	Total votes cast
Autauga	4,598	93.17%	337	6.83%	4,935
Baldwin	11,830	92.10%	1,015	7.90%	12,845
Barbour	272	95.77%	12	4.23%	284
Bibb	704	95.14%	36	4.86%	740
Blount	3,617	92.41%	297	7.59%	3,914
Bullock	31	91.18%	3	8.82%	34
Butler	415	96.96%	13	3.04%	428
Calhoun	4,275	92.29%	357	7.71%	4,632
Chambers	657	97.05%	20	2.95%	677
Cherokee	170	97.14%	5	2.86%	175
Chilton	2,187	96.81%	72	3.19%	2,259
Choctaw	36	97.30%	1	2.70%	37
Clarke	482	98.57%	7	1.43%	489
Clay	417	93.08%	31	6.92%	448
Cleburne	382	96.95%	12	3.05%	394
Coffee	2,878	94.70%	161	5.30%	3,039
Colbert	973	96.43%	36	3.57%	1,009
Conecuh	82	92.13%	7	7.87%	89
Coosa	192	93.20%	14	6.80%	206
Covington	913	97.44%	24	2.56%	937
Crenshaw	386	97.23%	11	2.77%	397
Cullman	4,425	95.20%	223	4.80%	4,648
Dale	3,987	90.37%	425	9.63%	4,412
Dallas	284	95.62%	13	4.38%	297
DeKalb	1,567	94.68%	88	5.32%	1,655
Elmore	7,081	93.33%	506	6.67%	7,587
Escambia	403	98.29%	7	1.71%	410
Etowah	3,031	95.22%	152	4.78%	3,183
Fayette	437	94.59%	25	5.41%	462
Franklin	219	95.63%	10	4.37%	229
Geneva	2,641	90.01%	293	9.99%	2,934
Greene	26	96.30%	1	3.70%	27
Hale	138	96.50%	5	3.50%	143
Henry	363	96.29%	14	3.71%	377
Houston	5,960	94.62%	339	5.38%	6,299
Jackson	337	95.20%	17	4.80%	354
Jefferson	27,617	92.17%	2,347	7.83%	29,964
Lamar	63	98.44%	1	1.56%	64
Lauderdale	1,672	95.71%	75	4.29%	1,747
Lawrence	413	94.94%	22	5.06%	435
Lee	5,588	87.83%	774	12.17%	6,362
Limestone	1,748	94.54%	101	5.46%	1,849
Lowndes	220	96.49%	8	3.51%	228
Macon	122	91.73%	11	8.27%	133
Madison	10,760	90.74%	1,098	9.26%	11,858
Marengo	88	100%	0	0%	88
Marion	528	96.70%	18	3.30%	546
Marshall	3,687	94.39%	219	5.61%	3,906
Mobile	14,397	94.10%	902	5.90%	15,299
Monroe	402	96.17%	16	3.83%	418
Montgomery	7,909	92.87%	607	7.13%	8,516
Morgan	6,931	91.29%	661	8.71%	7,592
Perry	80	93.02%	6	6.98%	86
Pickens	281	97.57%	7	2.43%	288
Pike	1,642	94.53%	95	5.47%	1,737
Randolph	271	93.13%	20	6.87%	291
Russell	576	95.84%	25	4.16%	601
Shelby	14,005	92.93%	1,066	7.07%	15,071
St. Clair	5,385	93.18%	394	6.82%	5,779
Sumter	68	98.55%	1	1.45%	69
Talladega	2,691	93.89%	175	6.11%	2,866
Tallapoosa	1,255	94.36%	75	5.64%	1,330
Tuscaloosa	6,844	92.03%	593	7.97%	7,437
Walker	1,648	96.49%	60	3.51%	1,708
Washington	144	98.63%	2	1.37%	146
Wilcox	80	94.12%	5	5.88%	85
Winston	3,527	88.11%	476	11.89%	4,003
Total	187,038	92.83%	14,449	7.17%	201,487
