= 2004 Arizona Democratic presidential primary =

- February 3, 2004

64 pledged delegates to the 2004 Democratic National Convention
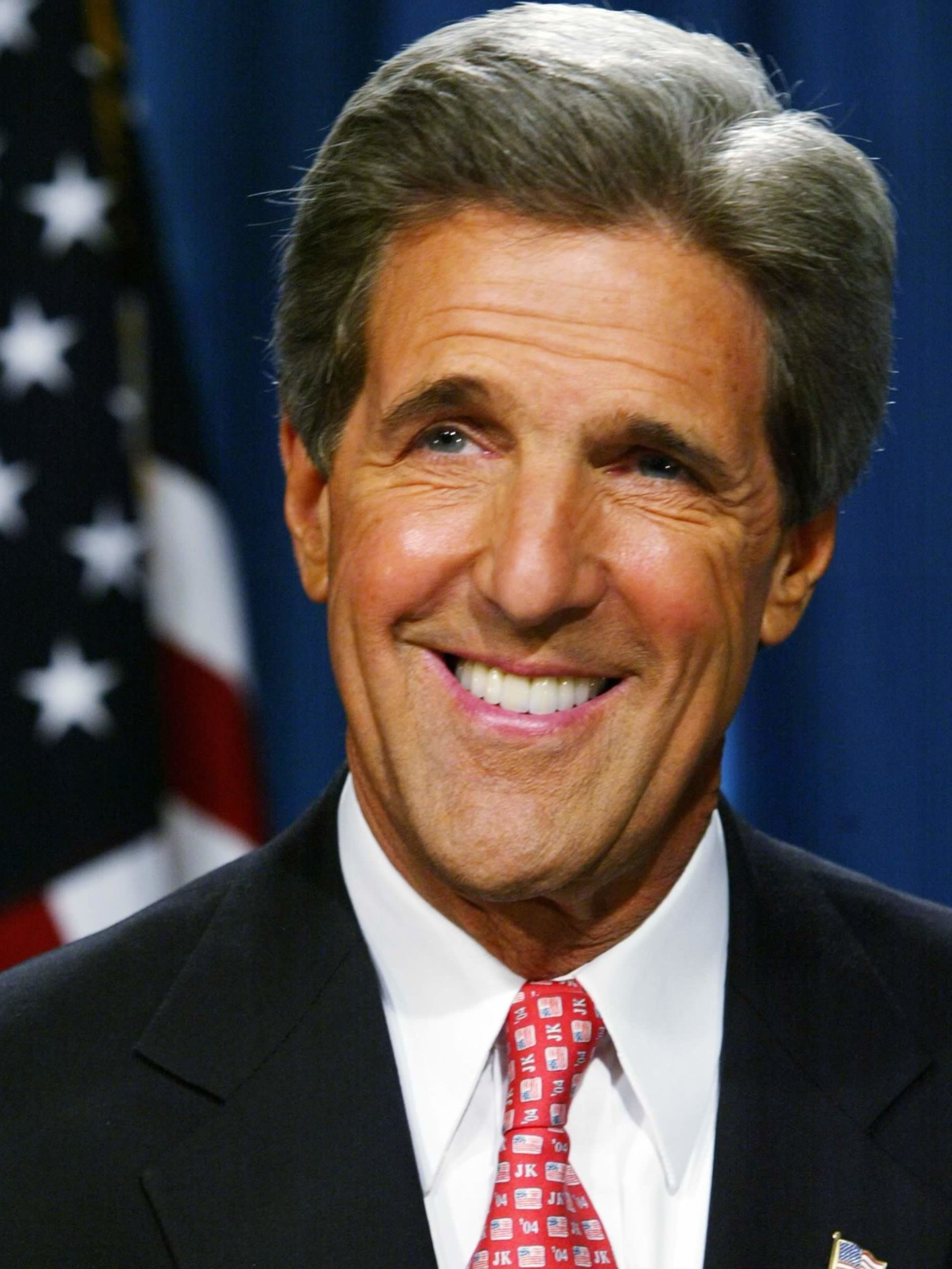

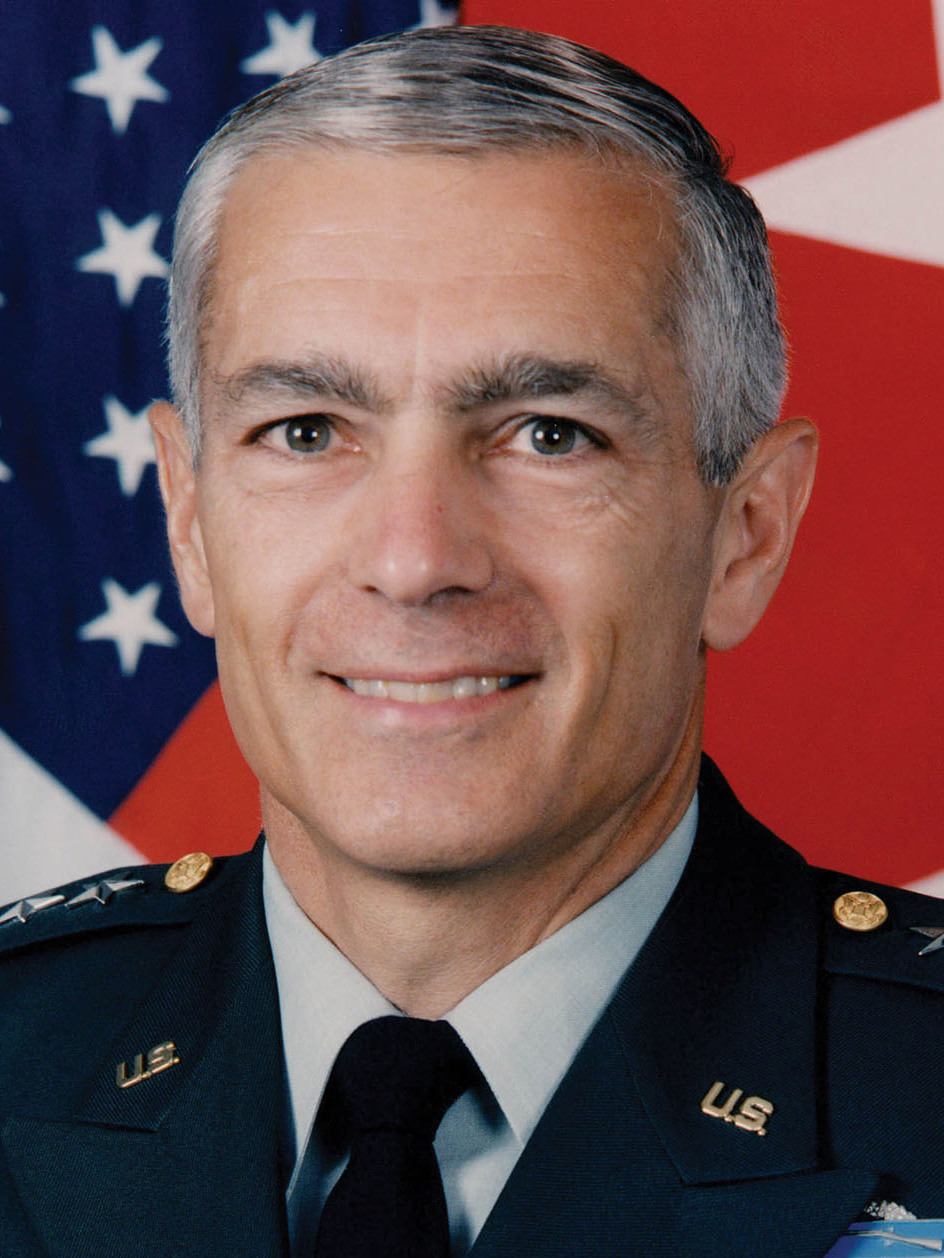

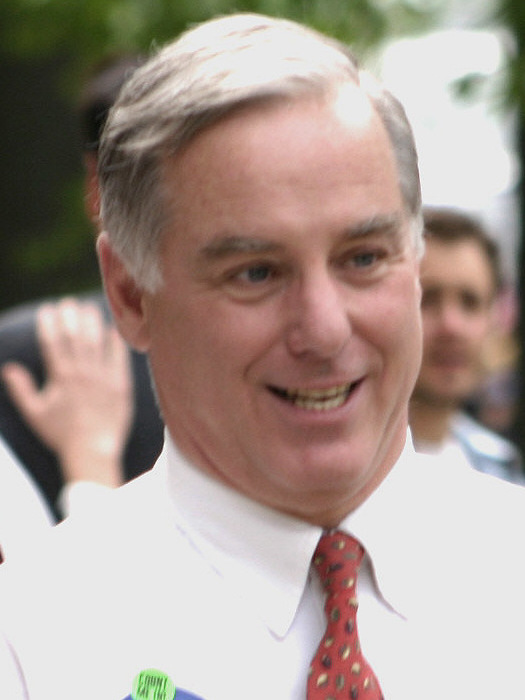

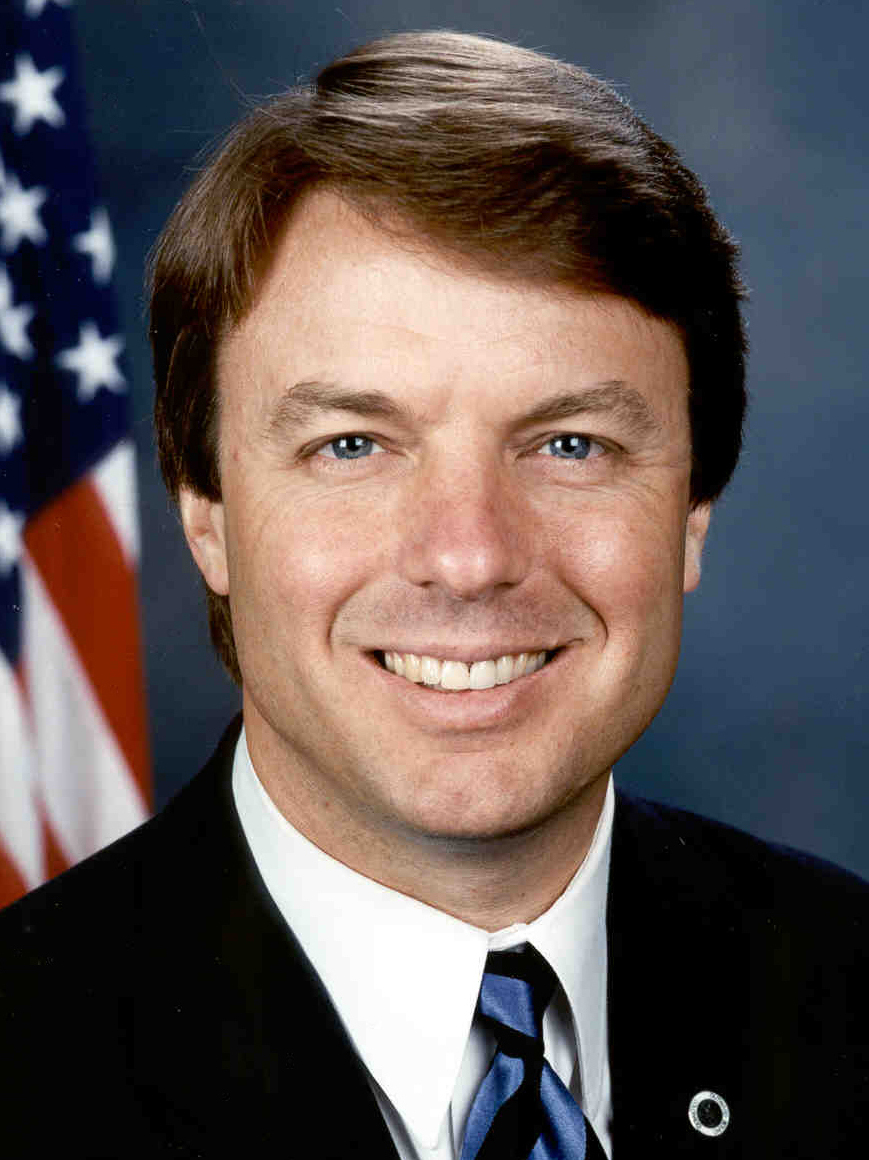

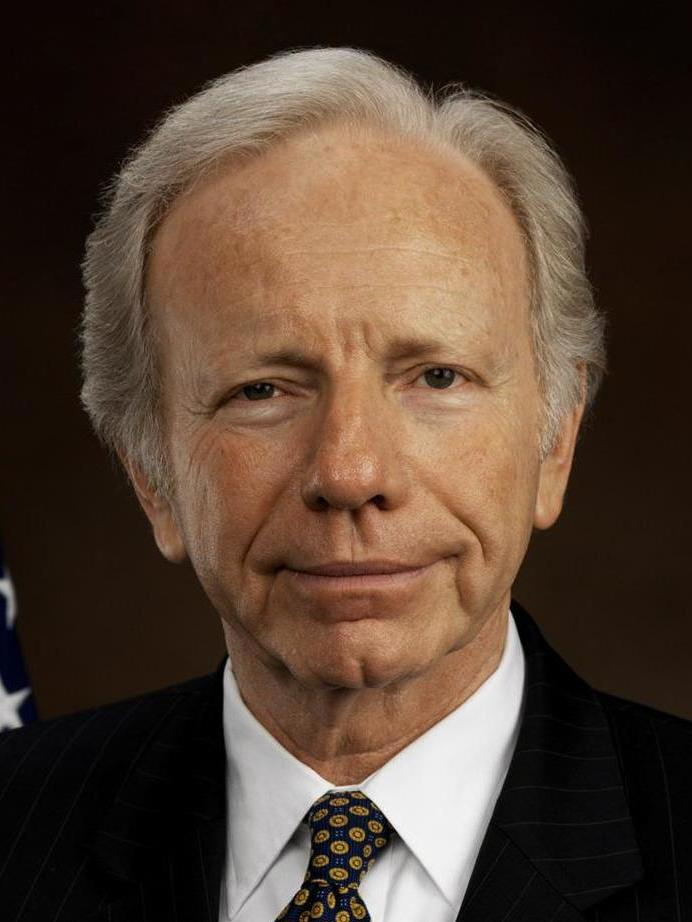
Candidate	John Kerry	Wesley Clark	Howard Dean
Home state	Massachusetts	Arkansas	Vermont
Delegate count	30	22	3
Popular vote	101,809	63,256	33,555
Percentage	42.61%	26.47%	14.04%
Candidate	John Edwards	Joe Lieberman
Home state	North Carolina	Connecticut
Delegate count	0	0
Popular vote	16,596	15,906
Percentage	6.95%	6.66%
- Caucus results by county Kerry: 30–40% 40–50% Clark: 30–40%

The 2004 Arizona Democratic presidential primary took place on February 3, 2004, as part of the 2004 United States Democratic presidential primaries. The delegate allocation is Proportional. the candidates are awarded delegates in proportion to the percentage of votes received and is open to registered Democrats only. A total of 55 (of 64) delegates are awarded proportionally. A 15 percent threshold is required to receive delegates. Frontrunner John Kerry won the primary with former general Wesley Clark coming second.

In 2003 the Arizona primary had been moved up from February 24 on Tuesday February 3, 2004 by Democratic Governor Janet Napolitano in order to give the state more influence in the nomination contest.

== Campaign ==
The candidates began campaigning in Arizona in September 2003 and by the time of the primary had spent 2.5 million dollars on television adverts in the state. Arizona was the first primary in the Western United States and as such was regarded as the first chance to see how the candidates appealed among Hispanic voters.

Howard Dean was the early favourite for the primary but by the time of the primary he had lost ground to both Wesley Clark and John Kerry. Kerry surged strongly in the polls after he had established himself as the strong frontrunner for the nomination in Iowa and New Hampshire. Exit polls showed Kerry did well among the half of voters who made up their minds in the last week before the primary.

== Endorsements ==
Wesley Clark got the endorsement of former Mayor of Phoenix, Arizona Paul Johnson while Kerry got the endorsements of several state officials. Howard Dean received the endorsement of former Governor Bruce Babbitt. However Governor Janet Napolitano avoided endorsing any of the candidates and only endorsed John Kerry after the primary was finished on March 1.

Joe Lieberman made the most visits of any of the candidates to Arizona and this helped him to get the endorsement of Phoenix newspaper, The Arizona Republic.

== Polling ==
Opinion polling
Candidate	22 December 2003	9 January 2004	24 January 2004	29 January 2004	1 February 2004
John Kerry	6%	3%	24%	29%	42%
Wesley Clark	15%	34%	21%	22%	28%
Howard Dean	26%	27%	10%	13%	15%
John Edwards	1%	3%	15%	8%	7%
Joe Lieberman	9%	6%	7%	3%	6%
Dick Gephardt	-	6%	-	-	-
Dennis Kucinich	1%	-	-	2%	1%
Al Sharpton	-	-	-	1%	-
Carol Moseley Braun	-	1%	-	-	-

== Results ==
United States democratic presidential primary election in Arizona, 2004
Party	Candidate	Votes	Percentage	Delegates
Democratic	John F. Kerry	101,809	42.6%	30
Democratic	Wesley Clark	63,256	26.5%	22
Democratic	Howard Dean	33,555	14.0%	3
Democratic	John Edwards	16,596	7.0%	0
Democratic	Joe Lieberman	15,906	6.7%	0
Democratic	Dennis Kucinich	3,896	1.63%	0
Democratic	Al Sharpton	1,177	0.49%	0
Democratic	Dick Gephardt (withdrawn)	755	0.32%	0
Democratic	Others	1,992	0.83%	0
Totals			100.00%	54
Voter turnout			%	—

== Reaction ==
After the election, John Kerry welcomed the results saying

"I am stunned by the results and truly honored and humbled by the confidence that so many voters in Arizona have shown me today."

== Analysis ==
On Mini Tuesday, John Kerry won the Arizona Primary election with about 43% of the vote. He also won every congressional district and county, except Greenlee County which voted for Wesley Clark. The largest turnouts in the state came from Maricopa County and Pima County. Exit polls showed he did well among older voters, Hispanics and veterans. He defeated his rivals among liberals, moderates and conservatives.

== See also ==
- 2004 Democratic Party presidential primaries
