= 2004 New Hampshire Republican presidential primary =

- January 27, 2004

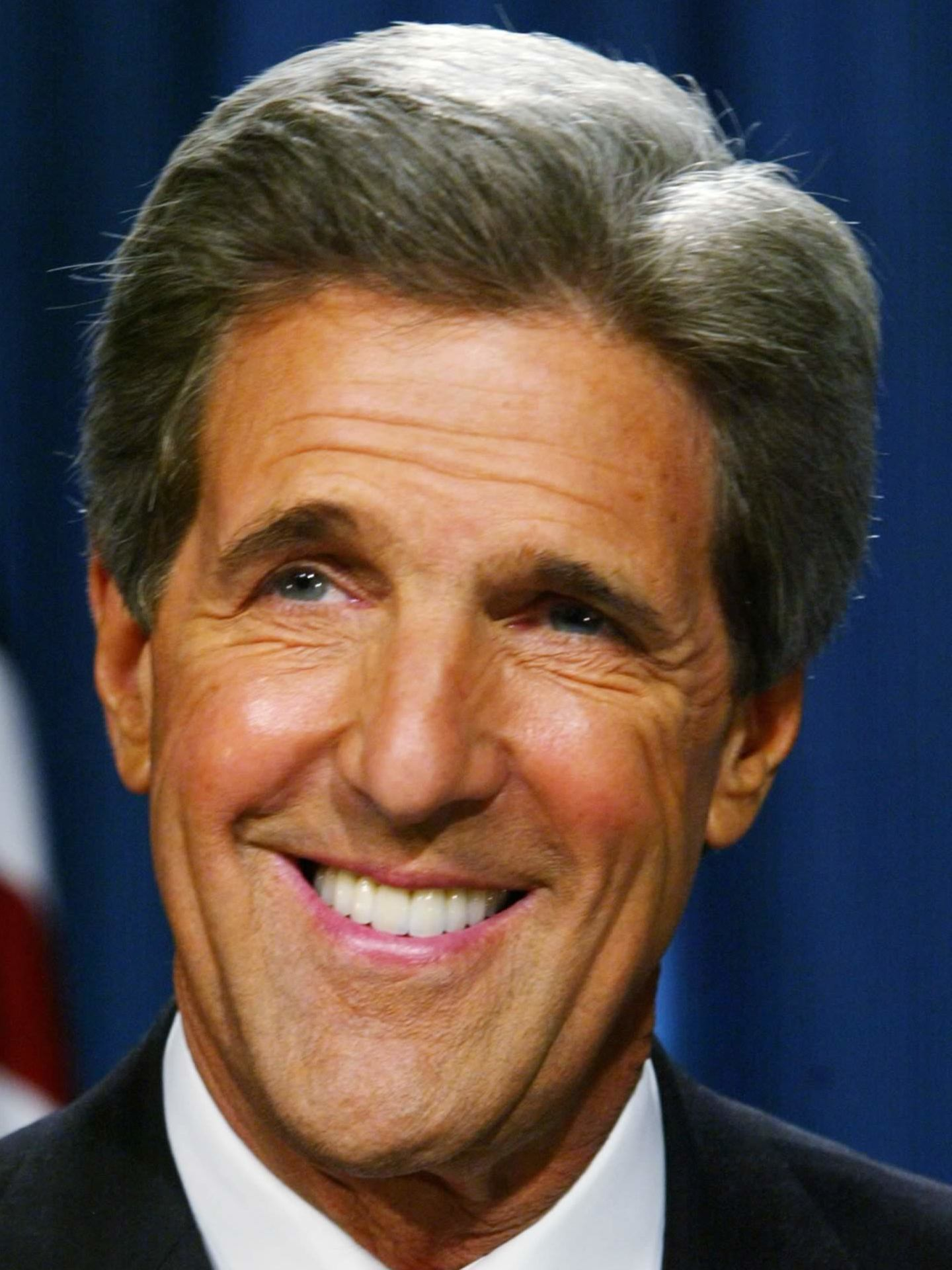
Candidate	George W. Bush	John Kerry (write-in)
Home state	Texas	Massachusetts
Delegate count	29	0
Popular vote	53,962	2,819
Percentage	79.80%	4.17%
- Municipality results Bush: 50% 55% 60% 65% 70% 75% 80% 85% 90% 95% No votes

The 2004 New Hampshire Democratic presidential primary was held on January 27, 2004, in New Hampshire as one of the Republican Party's statewide nomination contests ahead of the 2004 United States presidential election. Incumbent President George W. Bush ran virtually unopposed, and thus won all 29 of the Granite State's delegates to the Republican National Convention.

== Results ==
2004 New Hampshire Republican presidential primary
Candidate	Votes	%	Delegates
George W. Bush (incumbent)	53,962	79.80	29
John Kerry (write-in)	2,819	4.17	
Howard Dean (write-in)	1,789	2.65	
Wesley Clark (write-in)	1,407	2.08	
John Edwards (write-in)	1,088	1.61	
Joe Lieberman (write-in)	914	1.35	
Richard Bosa	841	1.24	
John Buchanan	836	1.24	
John Rigazio	803	1.19	
Robert Haines	579	0.86	
Michael Callis	388	0.57	
Blake Ashby	264	0.39	
Millie Howard	239	0.35	
Tom Laughlin	154	0.23	
Bill Wyatt	153	0.23	
Jim Taylor	124	0.18	
Mark Harnes	87	0.13	
Cornelius O'Connor	77	0.11	
George Gostigian	52	0.08	
Other write-ins	1,048	1.67	
Total	67,624	100%	29
