= 2004 Idaho Republican presidential primary =

- May 25, 2004

26 pledged delegates to the 2004 Republican National Convention

Candidate	George W. Bush	None of the Names Shown
Home state	Texas	n/a
Delegate count	26	0
Popular vote	110,800	12,993
Percentage	89.49%	10.49%
- Primary results by county Bush: 65% 75% 80% 85% 90% 95%

The 2004 Idaho Republican presidential primary was held on May 25, 2004, to choose the state's 26 pledged delegates to the 2004 Republican National Convention.

Incumbent President George W. Bush won the primary and all of the state's delegates.

== Results ==
2004 Idaho Republican presidential primary
Candidate	Votes	%	Delegates
George W. Bush	110,800	89.49%	26
None of the Names Shown	12,993	10.49%	
Nancy Warrick (write-in)	15	0.01%	
Total	123,808	100%	26

=== Results by county ===
2004 Idaho Republican presidential primary (results by county)
County	George W. Bush		None of the Names Shown		Nancy Warrick		Total votes cast
County	Votes	%	Votes	%	Votes	%	Total votes cast
Ada	13,679	85.78%	2,267	14.22%	0	0%	15,946
Adams	516	96.45%	19	3.55%	0	0%	535
Bannock	3,008	94.50%	175	5.50%	0	0%	3,183
Bear Lake	1,862	97.69%	44	2.31%	0	0%	1,906
Benewah	695	96.39%	26	3.61%	0	0%	721
Bingham	5,260	89.64%	608	10.36%	0	0%	5,868
Blaine	900	87.80%	125	12.20%	0	0%	1,025
Boise	624	97.65%	14	2.19%	1	0.16%	639
Bonner	2,658	86.72%	407	13.28%	0	0%	3,065
Bonneville	5,614	91.49%	522	8.51%	0	0%	6,136
Boundary	1,636	96.24%	63	3.71%	1	0.06%	1,700
Butte	230	95.44%	11	4.56%	0	0%	241
Camas	158	96.93%	5	3.07%	0	0%	163
Canyon	12,815	87.78%	1,784	12.22%	0	0%	14,599
Caribou	707	99.72%	2	0.28%	0	0%	709
Cassia	2,565	96.32%	98	3.68%	0	0%	2,663
Clark	176	92.63%	14	7.37%	0	0%	190
Clearwater	721	92.20%	61	7.80%	0	0%	782
Custer	811	98.78%	10	1.22%	0	0%	821
Elmore	1,721	86.14%	277	13.86%	0	0%	1,998
Franklin	3,179	94.03%	202	5.97%	0	0%	3,381
Fremont	2,797	92.59%	224	7.41%	0	0%	3,021
Gem	2,421	86.77%	369	13.23%	0	0%	2,790
Gooding	1,352	88.14%	182	11.86%	0	0%	1,534
Idaho	3,394	97.50%	87	2.50%	0	0%	3,481
Jefferson	2,044	95.60%	91	4.26%	3	0.14%	2,138
Jerome	2,204	90.07%	243	9.93%	0	0%	2,447
Kootenai	8,715	85.39%	1,491	14.61%	0	0%	10,206
Latah	2,399	69.20%	1,068	30.80%	0	0%	3,467
Lemhi	1,169	91.69%	106	8.31%	0	0%	1,275
Lewis	574	94.10%	36	5.90%	0	0%	610
Lincoln	715	97.01%	22	2.99%	0	0%	737
Madison	4,491	94.05%	284	5.95%	0	0%	4,775
Minidoka	1,774	90.93%	177	9.07%	0	0%	1,951
Nez Perce	2,419	90.50%	254	9.50%	0	0%	2,673
Oneida	649	93.79%	41	5.92%	2	0.29%	692
Owyhee	1,230	97.08%	37	2.92%	0	0%	1,267
Payette	2,602	88.29%	345	11.71%	0	0%	2,947
Power	836	88.56%	101	10.70%	7	0.74%	944
Shoshone	458	93.66%	31	6.34%	0	0%	489
Teton	797	98.88%	9	1.12%	0	0%	806
Twin Falls	5,697	89.70%	654	10.30%	0	0%	6,351
Valley	1,348	78.33%	372	21.62%	1	0.06%	1,721
Washington	1,180	97.12%	35	2.88%	0	0%	1,215
Total	110,800	89.49%	12,993	10.49%	15	0.01%	123,808

== See also ==
- 2004 Idaho Democratic presidential caucuses
- 2004 United States presidential election in Idaho
