= 2004 Oregon Democratic presidential primary =

- May 18, 2004

59 Democratic National Convention delegates (46 pledged, 13 unpledged) The number of pledged delegates received is determined by the popular vote
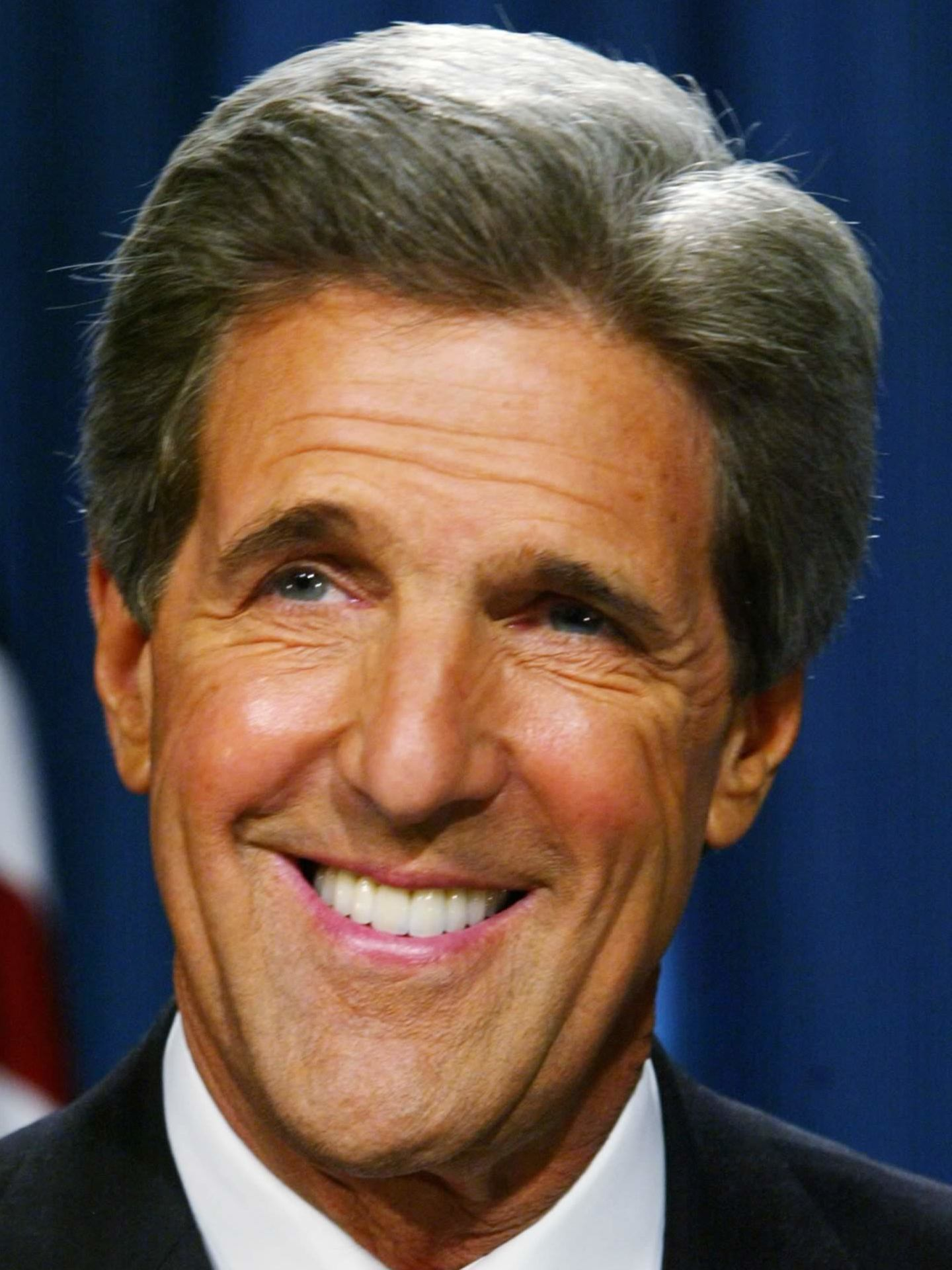

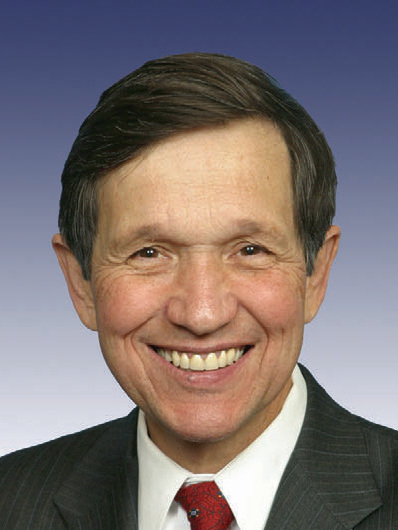
Candidate	John Kerry	Dennis Kucinich
Home state	Massachusetts	Ohio
Delegate count	40	6
Popular vote	289,804	60,019
Percentage	78.63%	16.29%
- County results Kerry: 60–70% 70–80% 80–90%

The 2004 Oregon Democratic presidential primary was held on May 18 in the U.S. state of Oregon as one of the Democratic Party's statewide nomination contests ahead of the 2004 presidential election.

== Background ==
Through the first months of 2004, the Democratic Party presidential primaries took place throughout the United States to determine which candidate would run against incumbent Republican president George W. Bush in the general election. By the time of the May 18 primary, Massachusetts Senator John Kerry had already attained enough delegates to ensure his nomination, and most other candidates had dropped out of the race.

== Campaign ==
Although Kerry had already secured the nomination, Kucinich spent weeks actively campaigning in the state, making public appearances and running TV ads. He hoped that a successful showing in Oregon would influence Kerry to adopt more liberal issue positions. Kucinich's best showings in the primary had been in the Hawaii and Alaska caucuses, having won over a quarter of the vote in each.

== Results ==
2004 Oregon Democratic presidential primary
Candidate	Votes	%	Pledged delegates
John Kerry	289,804	78.63	40
Dennis Kucinich	60,019	16.29	6
Write-ins	10,150	2.75	0
Lyndon LaRouche	8,571	2.33	0
Total	368,544	100%	46

== Analysis ==
Although the Oregon primary coincided with primaries in Kentucky and Arkansas, analysts were especially interested in the results in Oregon, as the state was expected to be a battleground in the general election. The Los Angeles Times quoted an Oregon pollster who interpreted the results as an indication that "Democrats will stomach a lot to get rid of George Bush this year", regardless of their feelings about Kerry.
