= 2004 Kentucky Republican presidential primary =

- May 18, 2004

43 pledged delegates to the; 2004 Republican National Convention

Candidate	George W. Bush	Uncommitted
Home state	Texas	n/a
Delegate count	43	0
Popular vote	108,603	8,776
Percentage	92.83%	7.48%
- Primary results by county Bush: 85% 90% 95%

The 2004 Kentucky Republican presidential primary was held on June 1, 2004, along with primaries in Arkansas and Oregon. Registered Republican voters chose the state's 43 pledged delegates to the 2004 Republican National Convention.

Incumbent president George W. Bush won the primary and all of the state's delegates.

== Procedure ==
Kentucky was allocated 46 delegates to the Republican National Convention: 43 were allocated based on the results of the primary, with the other three being unpledged superdelegates.

All 43 pledged delegates were awarded based on the statewide popular vote, with a 15% threshold for qualifying for delegates.

== Results ==
2004 Kentucky Republican presidential primary
Candidate	Votes	%	Delegates
George W. Bush	108,603	92.52%	43
Uncommitted	8,776	7.48%	
Total	117,379	100%	43

2004 Kentucky Republican presidential primary (results by county)
County	George W. Bush		Uncommitted		Total votes cast
County	Votes	%	Votes	%	Total votes cast
Adair	873	94.69%	49	5.31%	922
Allen	346	93.51%	24	6.49%	370
Anderson	559	95.56%	26	4.44%	585
Ballard	45	93.75%	3	6.25%	48
Barren	444	96.10%	18	3.90%	462
Bath	51	92.73%	4	7.27%	55
Bell	765	91.40%	72	8.60%	837
Boone	5,727	94.19%	353	5.81%	6,080
Bourbon	255	91.73%	23	8.27%	278
Boyd	1,115	92.68%	88	7.32%	1,203
Boyle	855	95.42%	41	4.58%	896
Bracken	107	98.17%	2	1.83%	109
Breathitt	68	98.55%	1	1.45%	69
Breckinridge	797	93.65%	54	6.35%	851
Bullitt	943	95.06%	49	4.94%	992
Butler	709	93.29%	51	6.71%	760
Caldwell	143	95.97%	6	4.03%	149
Calloway	252	94.38%	15	5.62%	267
Campbell	2,896	93.06%	216	6.94%	3,112
Carlisle	38	100%	0	0%	38
Carroll	69	94.52%	4	5.48%	73
Carter	720	91.72%	65	8.28%	785
Casey	1,054	94.53%	61	5.47%	1,115
Christian	645	96.13%	26	3.87%	671
Clark	1,092	93.90%	71	6.10%	1,163
Clay	2,505	91.02%	247	8.98%	2,752
Clinton	307	92.75%	24	7.25%	331
Crittenden	195	94.66%	11	5.34%	206
Cumberland	239	91.92%	21	8.08%	260
Daviess	2,607	91.63%	238	8.37%	2,845
Edmonson	304	93.54%	21	6.46%	325
Elliott	11	91.67%	1	8.33%	12
Estill	734	94.47%	43	5.53%	777
Fayette	7,914	90.94%	788	9.06%	8,702
Fleming	247	94.64%	14	5.36%	261
Floyd	279	93.00%	21	7.00%	300
Franklin	1,225	89.74%	140	10.26%	1,365
Fulton	84	96.55%	3	3.45%	87
Gallatin	109	94.78%	6	5.22%	115
Garrard	621	93.10%	46	6.90%	667
Grant	382	96.22%	15	3.78%	397
Graves	189	94.50%	11	5.50%	200
Grayson	1,815	93.70%	122	6.30%	1,937
Green	289	92.63%	23	7.37%	312
Greenup	806	95.38%	39	4.62%	845
Hancock	231	92.77%	18	7.23%	249
Hardin	1,653	93.44%	116	6.56%	1,769
Harlan	497	93.42%	35	6.58%	532
Harrison	297	92.81%	23	7.19%	320
Hart	332	92.22%	28	7.78%	360
Henderson	210	92.92%	16	7.08%	226
Henry	274	95.47%	13	4.53%	287
Hickman	36	94.74%	2	5.26%	38
Hopkins	291	94.79%	16	5.21%	307
Jackson	1,332	94.33%	80	5.67%	1,412
Jefferson	16,447	90.67%	1,693	9.33%	18,140
Jessamine	1,293	94.04%	82	5.96%	1,375
Johnson	724	88.51%	94	11.49%	818
Kenton	5,849	93.48%	408	6.52%	6,257
Knott	34	89.47%	4	10.53%	38
Knox	712	91.40%	67	8.60%	779
LaRue	252	97.67%	6	2.33%	258
Laurel	4,854	92.42%	398	7.58%	5,252
Lawrence	435	92.16%	37	7.84%	472
Lee	270	95.41%	13	4.59%	283
Leslie	1,269	89.49%	149	10.51%	1,418
Letcher	384	89.93%	43	10.07%	427
Lewis	1,000	88.34%	132	11.66%	1,132
Lincoln	385	95.77%	17	4.23%	402
Livingston	68	95.77%	3	4.23%	71
Logan	331	90.19%	36	9.81%	367
Lyon	91	91.00%	9	9.00%	100
Madison	1,248	93.27%	90	6.73%	1,338
Magoffin	248	100%	0	0%	248
Marion	90	94.74%	5	5.26%	95
Marshall	282	98.60%	4	1.40%	286
Martin	380	89.41%	45	10.59%	425
Mason	265	92.66%	21	7.34%	286
McCracken	874	93.48%	61	6.52%	935
McCreary	799	88.38%	105	11.62%	904
McLean	83	91.21%	8	8.79%	91
Meade	518	95.57%	24	4.43%	542
Menifee	110	94.83%	6	5.17%	116
Mercer	684	93.70%	46	6.30%	730
Metcalfe	155	96.88%	5	3.13%	160
Monroe	366	94.33%	22	5.67%	388
Montgomery	244	93.85%	16	6.15%	260
Morgan	60	95.24%	3	4.76%	63
Muhlenberg	178	93.68%	12	6.32%	190
Nelson	648	95.58%	30	4.42%	678
Nicholas	48	90.57%	5	9.43%	53
Ohio	600	90.91%	60	9.09%	660
Oldham	1,976	93.52%	137	6.48%	2,113
Owen	133	95.00%	7	5.00%	140
Owsley	345	94.01%	22	5.99%	367
Pendleton	277	95.85%	12	4.15%	289
Perry	451	94.55%	26	5.45%	477
Pike	1,028	94.75%	57	5.25%	1,085
Powell	285	98.62%	4	1.38%	289
Pulaski	4,537	93.70%	305	6.30%	4,842
Robertson	27	100%	0	0%	27
Rockcastle	618	92.65%	49	7.35%	667
Rowan	337	91.33%	32	8.67%	369
Russell	1,893	91.45%	177	8.55%	2,070
Scott	653	93.29%	47	6.71%	700
Shelby	539	94.89%	29	5.11%	568
Simpson	58	96.67%	2	3.33%	60
Spencer	222	96.94%	7	3.06%	229
Taylor	582	95.88%	25	4.12%	607
Todd	48	97.96%	1	2.04%	49
Trigg	122	94.57%	7	5.43%	129
Trimble	125	98.43%	2	1.57%	127
Union	31	96.88%	1	3.13%	32
Warren	1,799	93.70%	121	6.30%	1,920
Washington	160	93.57%	11	6.43%	171
Wayne	1,170	91.84%	104	8.16%	1,274
Webster	42	93.33%	3	6.67%	45
Whitley	1,627	85.77%	270	14.23%	1,897
Wolfe	54	98.18%	1	1.82%	55
Woodford	603	91.64%	55	8.36%	658
Total	108,603	92.52%	8,776	7.48%	117,379
