= Mini-Tuesday =

Seven states held caucuses or primary elections on Mini-Tuesday in 2004. Blue denotes Democratic-only contests (4) and Purple represents states holding elections for both parties (3).

Mini-Tuesday was the name given to the February 3, 2004 U.S. presidential primary where several states, which to that point had participated in "Super Tuesday," cast their votes for the Presidential nominees of the 2004 Presidential election. Mini-Tuesday was also called Super Tuesday I (with the March Super Tuesday called Super Tuesday II, in reference to their respective chronological order). With the large number of states moving their election dates up to Mini-Tuesday for the 2008 election cycle, pundits have largely shied away from using the term again, instead choosing to reappropriate the term "Super Tuesday" to better represent the primaries held on that approximate date. The date is also known as "Super Duper Tuesday," "Giga Tuesday," and "Tsunami Tuesday," among others, with the term "Mini Tuesday" falling to apparent disuse for the time being.

In 2004, U.S. presidential primary elections occurred in Missouri, South Carolina, Arizona, Oklahoma and Delaware. Presidential caucuses were held in New Mexico and North Dakota. The Republican primaries and caucuses were virtually uncontested as incumbent President George W. Bush faced no substantial opposition. The Democratic primaries and caucuses were contested between retired General Wesley Clark of Arkansas, former Governor Howard Dean of Vermont, Senator John Edwards of North Carolina, Senator John Kerry of Massachusetts, Congressman Dennis Kucinich of Ohio, Senator Joseph Lieberman of Connecticut, and the Reverend Al Sharpton of New York. Of the seven Democratic primaries contested, five were won by Kerry, reinforcing his status as frontrunner for the 2004 nomination.

== 2004 Results ==
=== Missouri ===
The results of the 2004 Mini-Tuesday Democratic primary. Blue denotes states won by Kerry, green denotes states won by Edwards, and red denotes states won by Clark.

Kerry handily won the biggest prize of the day by securing 51% of the vote in Missouri. Edwards placed second with 25%. All other candidates were in the single digits.

Democratic Results:

Candidate	Votes	Percentage	Delegates
John Kerry	211,737	50.6%	48
John Edwards	103,188	24.7%	26
Howard Dean	36,305	8.7%	0
Wesley Clark	18,328	4.4%	0
Joseph Lieberman	14,726	3.5%	0
Al Sharpton	14,312	3.4%	0
Richard Gephardt	8,306	2.0%	0
Dennis Kucinich	4,876	1.2%	0
Uncommitted	4,316	1.0%	0

Republican Results:

Candidate	Votes	Percentage
George W. Bush	117,007	95.1%
Bill Wyatt	1,268	1.0%
Blake Ashby	981	0.8%
Uncommitted	3,830	3.4%

Libertarian Results:

Candidate	Votes	Percentage
Gary Nolan	874	45.2%
Ruben Perez	164	8.5%
Jeffrey Diket	152	7.9%
Uncommitted	744	38.5%

Source: Missouri Department of State

=== South Carolina ===
In a major victory, Edwards took his birth state of South Carolina, garnering 45% of the vote to Kerry's 30%.

Democratic Results:

Candidate	Votes	Percentage	Delegates
John Edwards	126,320	45.0%	28
John Kerry	84,872	30.2%	17
Al Sharpton	26,946	9.6%	0
Wesley Clark	20,189	7.2%	0
Howard Dean	13,055	4.7%	0
Joseph Lieberman	6,853	2.4%	0
Dennis Kucinich	1,246	0.4%	0
Richard Gephardt	604	0.2%	0
Carol Moseley Braun	569	0.2%	0

Republican Results:

On January 19, 2003, the Republican National Convention announced that the South Carolina Republican Party had passed a resolution granting George W. Bush South Carolina's 46 delegates.

Source: The Green Papers

=== Arizona ===
Kerry made a strong showing in Arizona by winning the support of 43% of voters. Clark placed second with 27%. Arizona was the only state primary in which Dean acquired any delegates. His 14% share of the vote netted him just one delegate.

Democratic Results:

Candidate	Votes	Percentage	Delegates
John Kerry	101,809	42.5%	30
Wesley Clark	63,256	26.7%	22
Howard Dean	33,555	13.9%	3
John Edwards	16,596	6.9%	0
Joseph Lieberman	15,906	6.7%	0
Dennis Kucinich	3,896	1.6%	0
Al Sharpton	1,177	0.5%	0
Richard Gephardt	755	0.3%	0
Carol Moseley Braun	325	0.1%	0
Lyndon LaRouche	295	0.1%	0
Dianne Barker	257	0.1%	0
Bill Wyatt	233	0.1%	0

Republican Results:

On March 12, 2003 - A state Senate committee in Arizona backed a Republican measure to save $3 million by forgoing that state's primary. District and county conventions will be held in April.

Sources: Arizona Department of State, The Green Papers

=== Oklahoma ===
Oklahoma was the most hotly contested state of Mini-Tuesday 2004. Clark needed it to stay in the race, while Edwards wanted it so that he could walk away with two victories. In the end, both candidates got 30% of the vote, with Clark slightly ahead of Edwards. Kerry also placed strongly with 27%.

Democratic Results:

Candidate	Votes	Percentage	Delegates
Wesley Clark	90,453	29.93%	15
John Edwards	89,234	29.53%	13
John Kerry	81,015	26.81%	12
Joseph Lieberman	19,678	6.51%	0
Howard Dean	12,728	4.21%	0
Al Sharpton	3,939	1.30%	0
Dennis Kucinich	2,544	0.84%	0
Richard Gephardt	1,890	0.64%	0
Lyndon LaRouche	688	0.23%	0

Republican Results:

Candidate	Votes	Percentage
George W. Bush	59,562	89.99%
Bill Wyatt	6,622	10.01%

Source: Oklahoma Department of State

=== Delaware ===
Lieberman took second place in Delaware with 11% of the vote. However, as this was insufficient to gain him any delegates, he dropped out of the race after a bad showing in the other primaries. Kerry carried the state with 50% of the vote and all thirteen delegates.

Democratic Results:

Candidate	Votes	Percentage	Delegates
John Kerry	16,787	50.4%	14
Joseph Lieberman	3,706	11.1%	0
John Edwards	3,674	11.0%	0
Howard Dean	3,462	10.4%	0
Wesley Clark	3,165	9.5%	0
Al Sharpton	1,888	5.7%	1
Dennis Kucinich	344	1.0%	0
Richard Gephardt	187	0.6%	0
Lyndon LaRouche	78	0.2%	0

Republican Results:

Regional meetings in April will choose delegates for a State Convention in mid-May.

Source: The Green Papers

=== Caucuses ===
In both New Mexico and North Dakota, Kerry placed first by a wide margin and Clark came in second to score a small number of delegates. Additionally, Dean achieved moderate success in New Mexico by netting 18% of the vote and three delegates.

Democratic Results:

New Mexico

Candidate	Votes	Percentage	Delegates
John Kerry	43,553	42.6%	14
Wesley Clark	20,883	20.4%	8
Howard Dean	16,747	16.4%	4
John Edwards	11,440	11.2%	0
Dennis Kucinich	5,638	5.5%	0
Joseph Lieberman	2,578	2.5%	0
Richard Gephardt	653	0.6%	0
Uncommitted	479	0.5%	10
write-in /others	176	0.2%	0
Fern Penna	84	0.1%	0

North Dakota

Candidate	Votes	Percentage	Delegates
John Kerry	5,366	50.8%	9
Wesley Clark	2,502	23.7%	5
Howard Dean	1,231	11.7%	4
John Edwards	1,025	9.7%	0
Dennis Kucinich	308	2.9%	0
Joseph Lieberman	98	0.9%	0
Al Sharpton	28	0.3%	0
Uncommitted	-	-	7

Republican Results:

George W. Bush won all 26 of North Dakota's Delegates to the Republican National Convention in the Republican Presidential Preference Caucus.

== See also ==
- Super Tuesday
- Super Tuesday (2008)
