= 2004 Nebraska Democratic presidential primary =

- May 11, 2004

24 pledged delegates to the 2004 Democratic National Convention
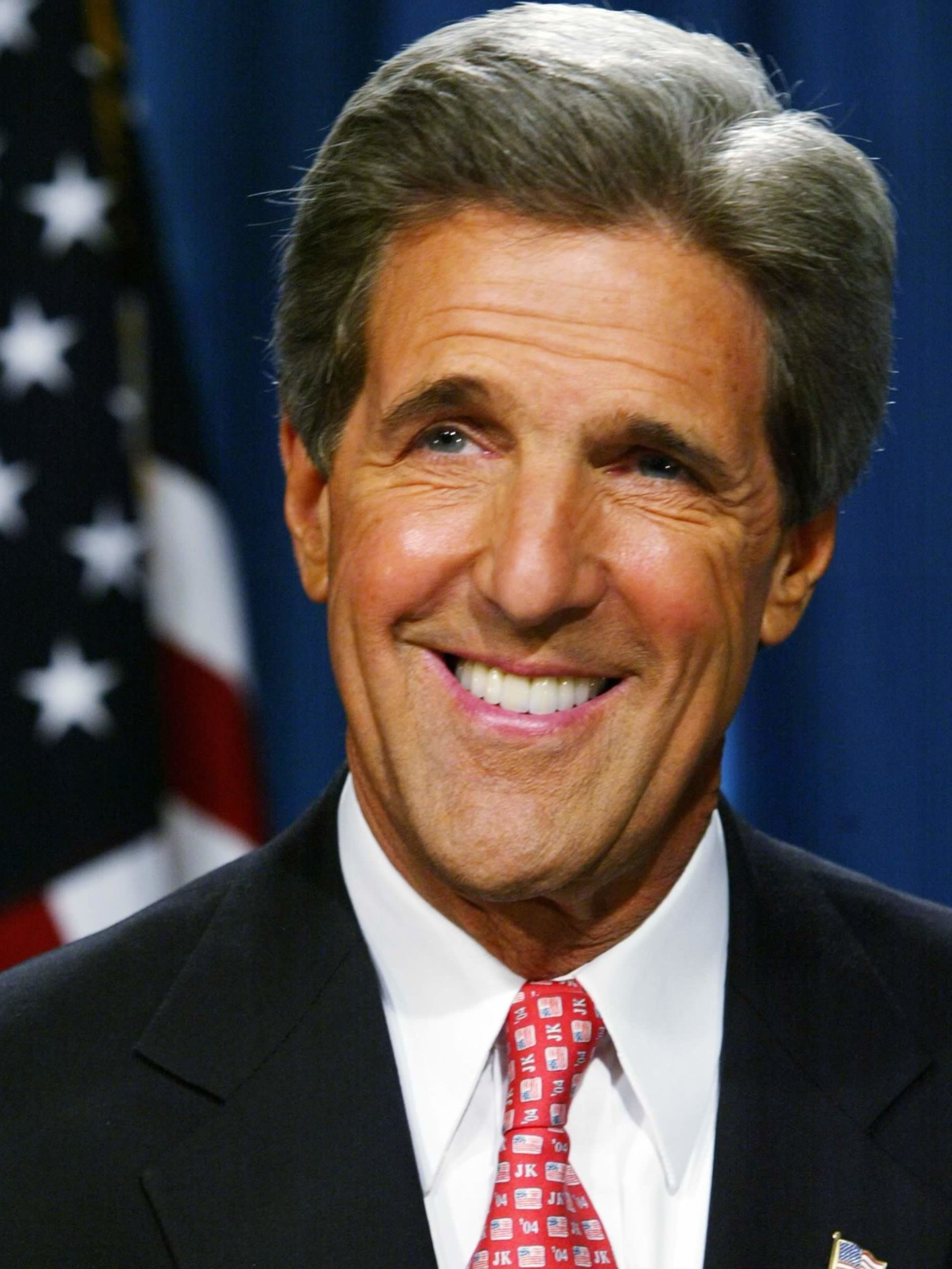

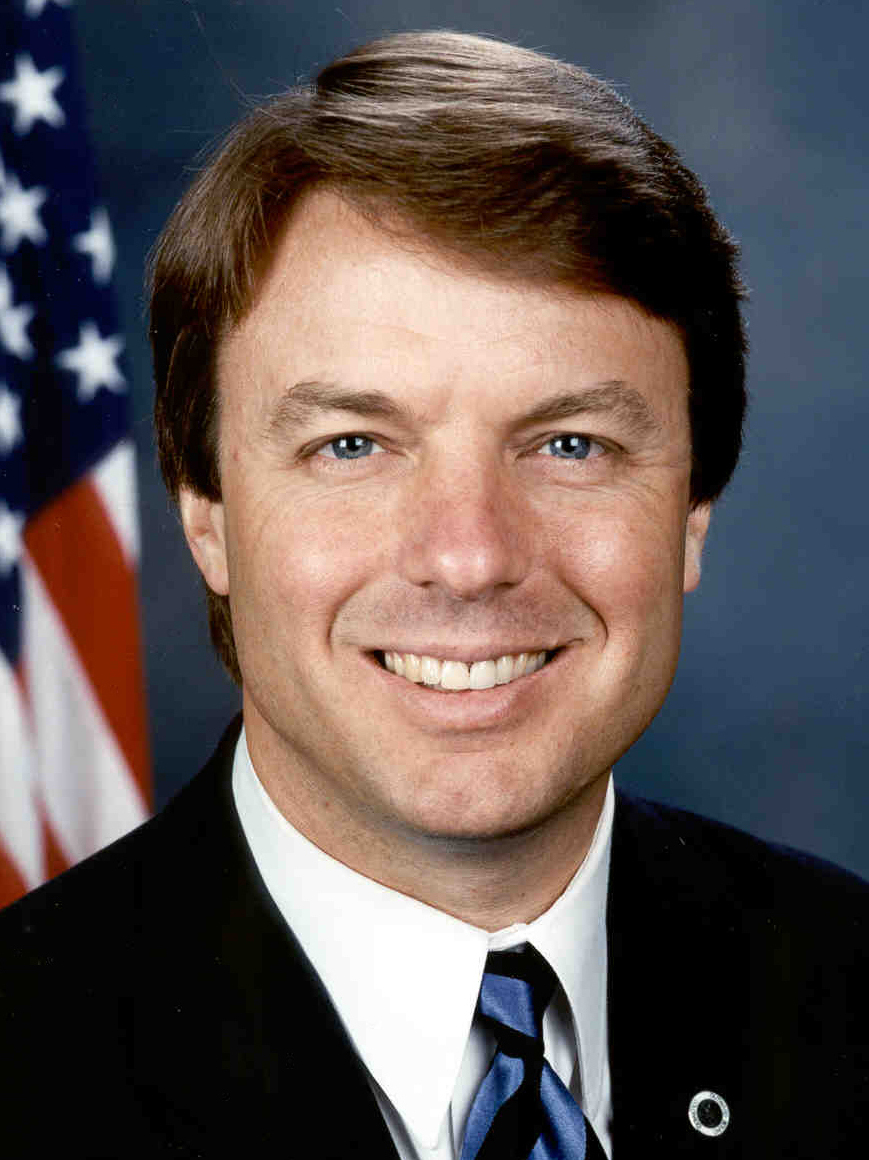

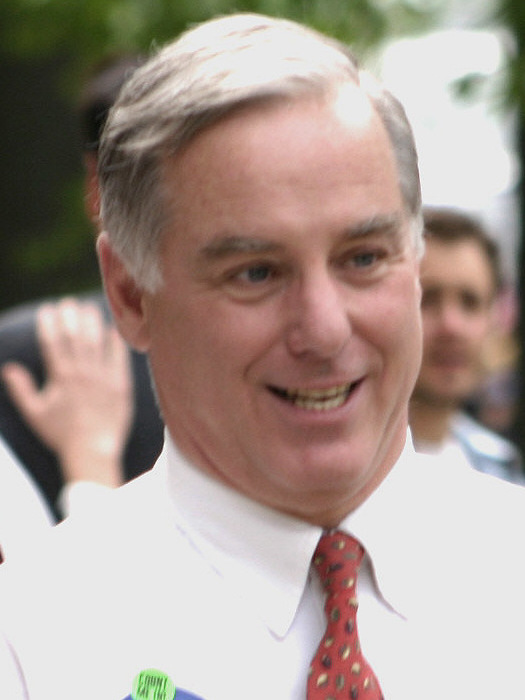
Candidate	John Kerry	John Edwards (withdrawn)	Howard Dean (withdrawn)
Home state	Massachusetts	North Carolina	Vermont
Delegate count	24	0	0
Popular vote	52,479	10,031	5,400
Percentage	72.22%	13.81%	7.43%
- County results Kerry: 50-60% 60-70% 70-80% 80-90%

The 2004 Nebraska Democratic presidential primary took place on May 11, 2004, along with West Virginia's primary. Nebraska's 24 pledged delegates were allocated based on the results of the primary.

Having already been the presumptive nominee for over two months, John Kerry won the primary by a considerable margin and earned all of the state's 24 delegates.

== Procedure ==
Pledged national convention delegates
Type	Del.
CD 1	6
CD 2	5
CD 3	5
PLEO	5
At-large	3
Total pledged delegates	24

Nebraska was allocated 31 delegates to the Democratic National Convention: 24 were allocated based on the results of the primary, with the other seven being unpledged superdelegates.

In order to qualify for delegates, a candidate had to receive at least 15% of the vote statewide or in at least one congressional district. 16 of Nebraska's delegates were allotted among the state's three congressional districts. The remaining eight delegates were allocated based on the statewide popular vote, consisting of three at-large delegates and five pledged PLEOs (party leaders and elected officials).

== Results ==
Having won enough delegates to secure the nomination on Super Tuesday, John Kerry faced only minor opposition from Dennis Kucinich, the only other candidate on the ballot who was still campaigning. Kerry won over 72% of the vote and netted all 24 of the state's pledged delegates.

2004 Nebraska Democratic presidential primary
Candidate	Votes	%	Delegates
John Kerry	52,479	72.22	24
John Edwards (withdrawn)	10,031	13.81	
Howard Dean (withdrawn)	5,400	7.43	
Dennis Kucinich	1,490	2.05	
Al Sharpton (withdrawn)	1,367	1.88	
Write-ins (Note: The Nebraska Secretary of State's official report of the primary results does not include write-in votes, though write-ins were reported by individual county election authorities.)	1,090	1.50	
Lyndon LaRouche	805	1.11	
Total	72,662	100%	24
