= Pruden (surname) =

Pruden is a surname. Notable people with the surname include:

- Aaron (Mitch) Pruden, American businessman and inventor
- Amy Pruden, American civil and environmental engineer
- Brenda Pruden Winnewisser, American scientist and oral historian
- Doug Pruden, Canadian endurance sportsman and street performer
- Harlan Pruden, First Nations Cree scholar and community organizer
- John Peter Pruden (1778–1868), early pioneer of western Canada
- Pat Pruden, Canadian nurse and politician
- Rachel E. Pruden-Herndon (1898–1979), African-American attorney
- Robert J. Pruden (1949–1969), United States Army soldier
- Wesley Pruden (1935–2019), American journalist and author
