= 2004 Rhode Island Democratic presidential primary =

- March 2, 2004

32 Democratic National Convention delegates (21 pledged, 11 unpledged) The number of pledged delegates received is determined by the popular vote
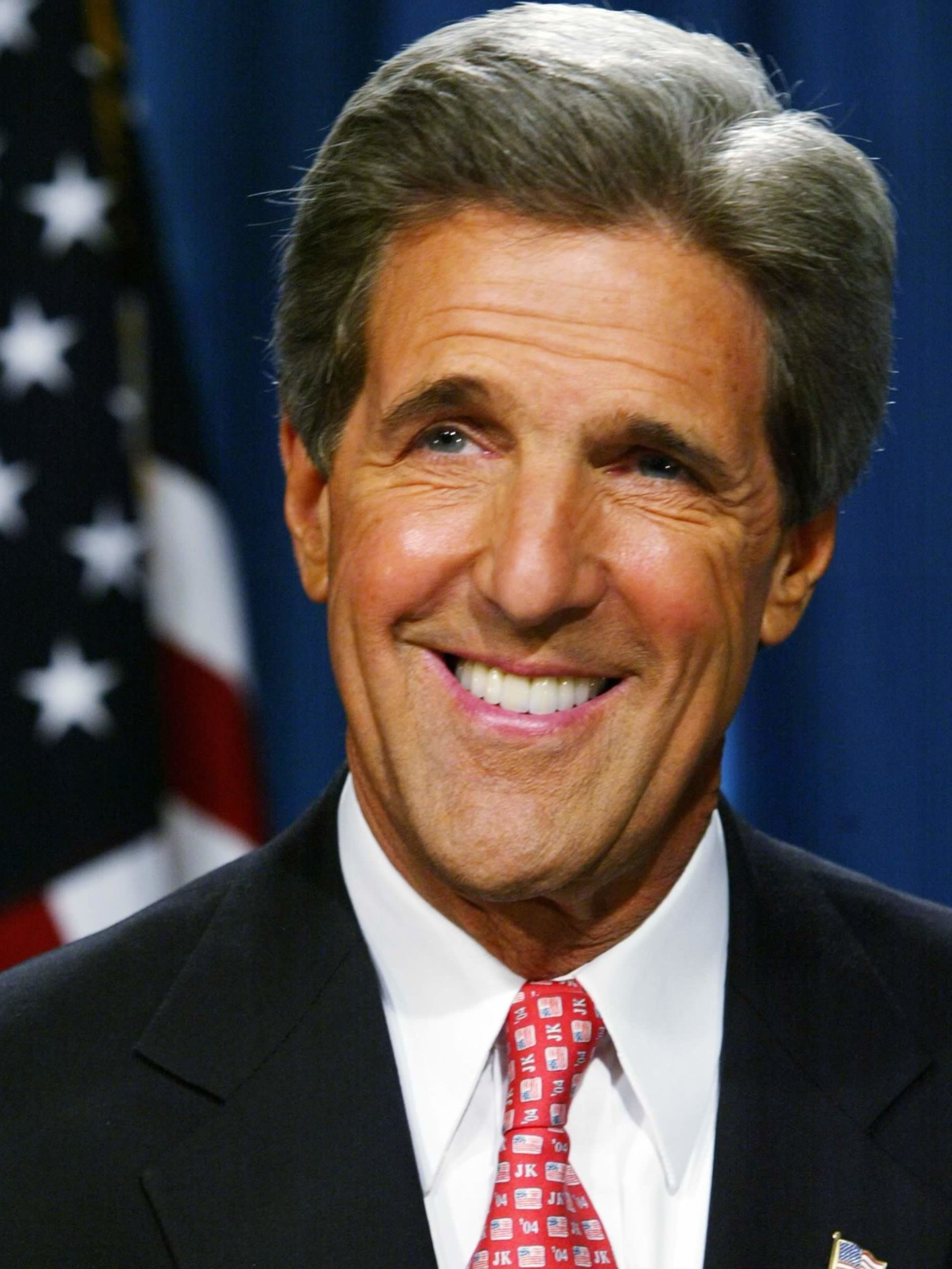

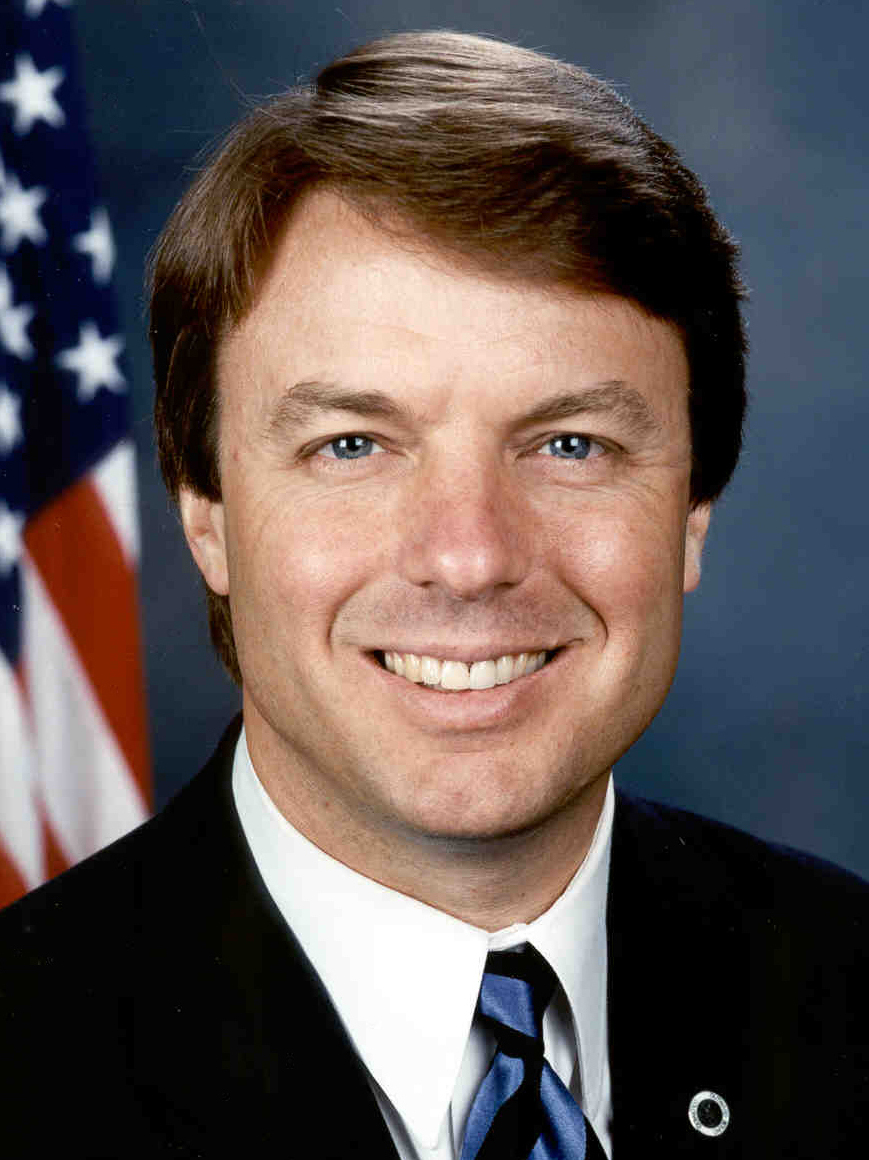
Candidate	John Kerry	John Edwards
Home state	Massachusetts	North Carolina
Delegate count	17	4
Popular vote	25,466	6,635
Percentage	71.22%	18.55%
- County results Kerry: 60–70% 70–80%

The 2004 Rhode Island Democratic presidential primary was held on March 2 in the U.S. state of Rhode Island as one of the Democratic Party's statewide nomination contests ahead of the 2004 presidential election.

== Results ==
2004 Rhode Island Democratic primary
Candidate	Votes	%	Delegates
John Kerry	25,466	71.22	17
John Edwards	6,635	18.55	4
Howard Dean (withdrawn)	1,425	3.99	0
Dennis Kucinich	1,054	2.95	0
Uncommitted	415	1.16	0
Joe Lieberman (withdrawn)	303	0.85	0
Wesley Clark (withdrawn)	237	0.66	0
Write-ins	161	0.45	0
Lyndon LaRouche	63	0.18	0
Total	35,759	100%	21
