= 2004 Utah Democratic presidential primary =

- February 24, 2004

29 Democratic National Convention delegates (23 pledged, 6 unpledged) The number of pledged delegates received is determined by the popular vote
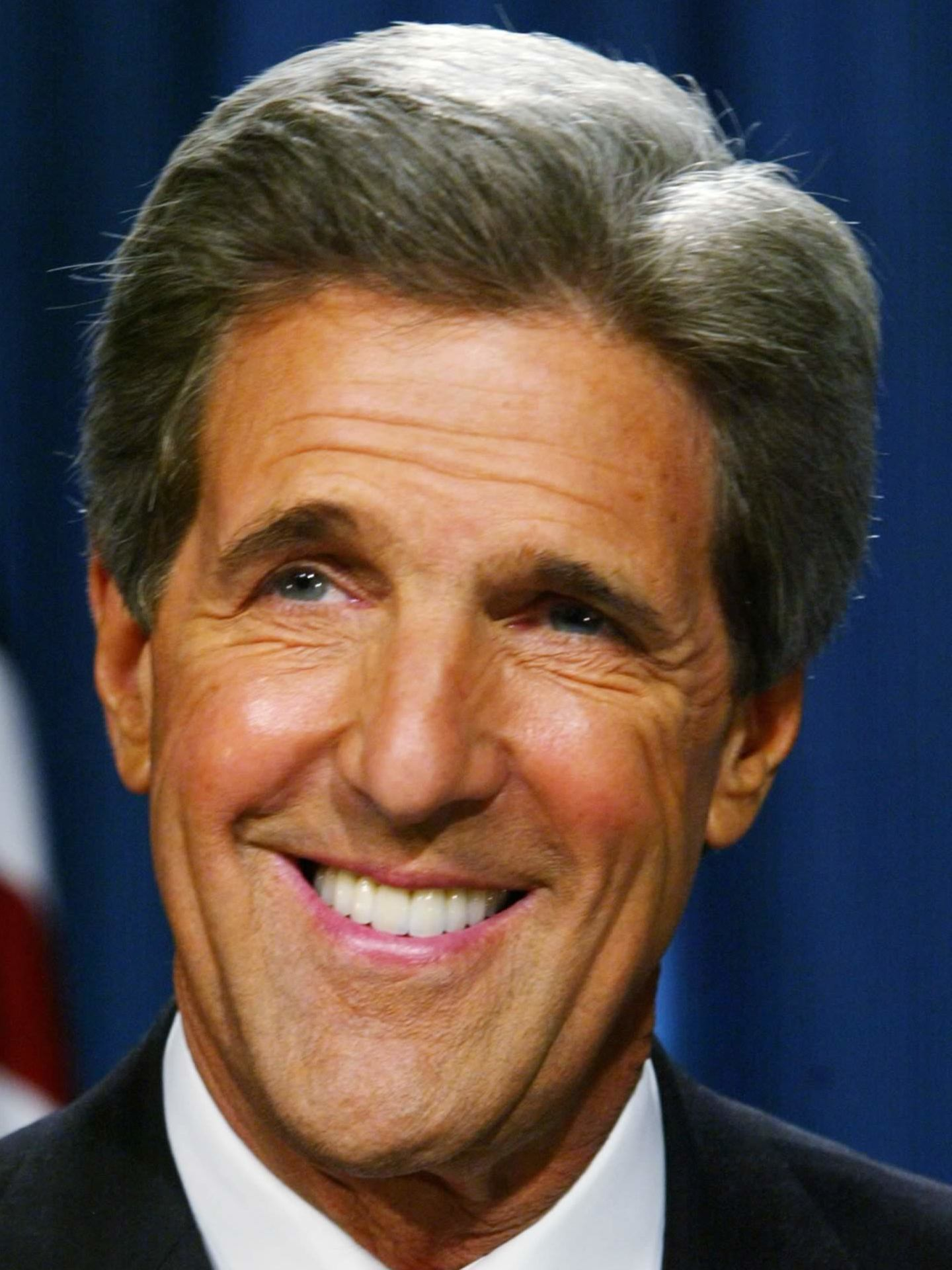

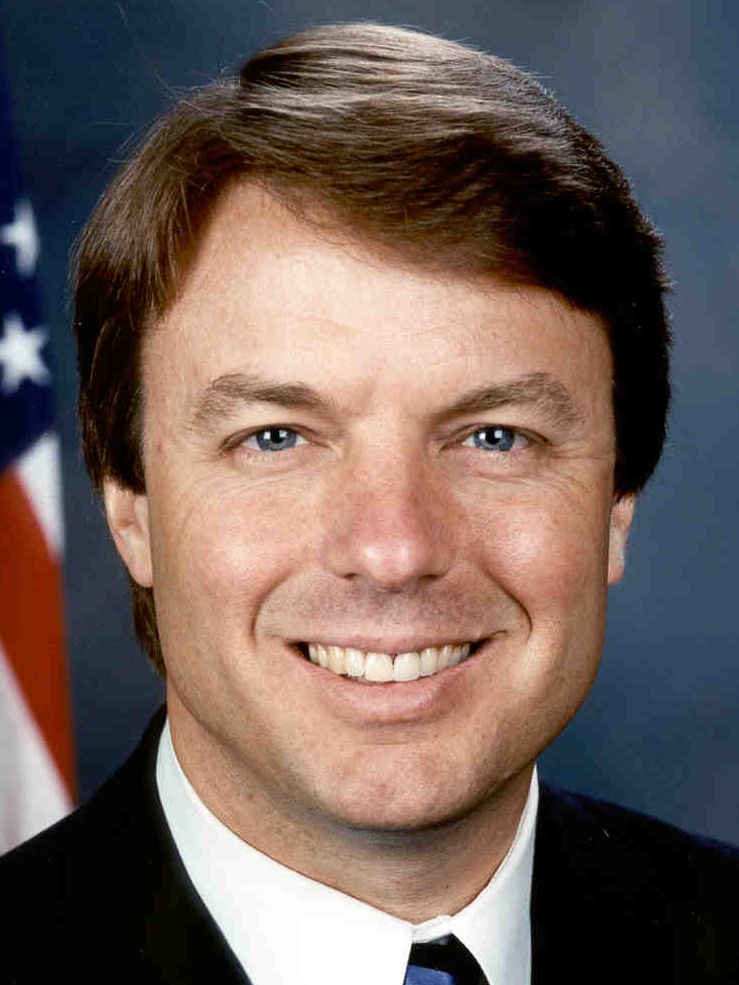

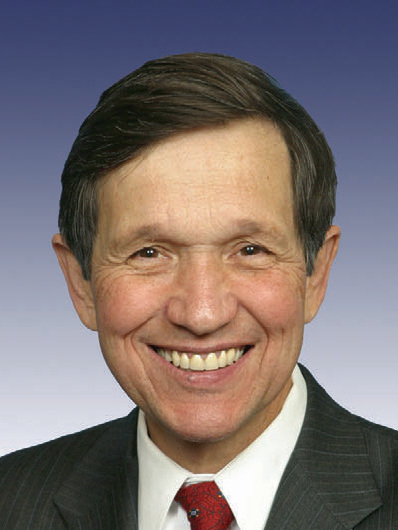
Candidate	John Kerry	John Edwards	Dennis Kucinich
Home state	Massachusetts	North Carolina	Ohio
Delegate count	14	9	0
Popular vote	19,232	10,384	2,590
Percentage	55.18%	29.79%	7.43%
- Primary results by county Kerry: 40–50% 50–60% 60–70% Edwards: 40–50% 50–60% No data/no votes

The 2004 Utah Democratic presidential primary was held on February 24 in the U.S. state of Utah as one of the Democratic Party's statewide nomination contests ahead of the 2004 presidential election.

== Results ==
2004 Utah Democratic presidential primary
Candidate	Votes	%	Delegates
John Kerry	19,232	55.18	14
John Edwards	10,384	29.79	9
Dennis Kucinich	2,590	7.43	0
Howard Dean (withdrawn)	1,335	3.83	0
Wesley Clark (withdrawn)	489	1.40	0
Joe Lieberman (withdrawn)	402	1.15	0
Uncommitted	298	0.85	0
Dick Gephardt (withdrawn)	124	0.36	0
Total	54,931	100%	23
