= Southern University at New Orleans =

Historically black university in Louisiana, US

- Former names: Southern University and Agricultural & Mechanical College New Orleans Branch Unit (1956–1975)
- Type: Public historically black university
- Established: September 4, 1956
- Parent institution: SU System
- Academic affiliations: Space-grant
- Chancellor: Joseph Bouie
- Faculty: 225
- Administrative staff: 156
- Students: 2,715
- Undergraduates: 2,220
- Postgraduates: 495
- Location: New Orleans, Louisiana, United States; 30.0265°N 90.0451°W
- Campus: Urban
- Colors: Columbia Blue & Sunset Gold
- Nickname: Knights and Lady Knights
- Sporting affiliations: NAIA – HBCUAC
- Website: www.suno.edu
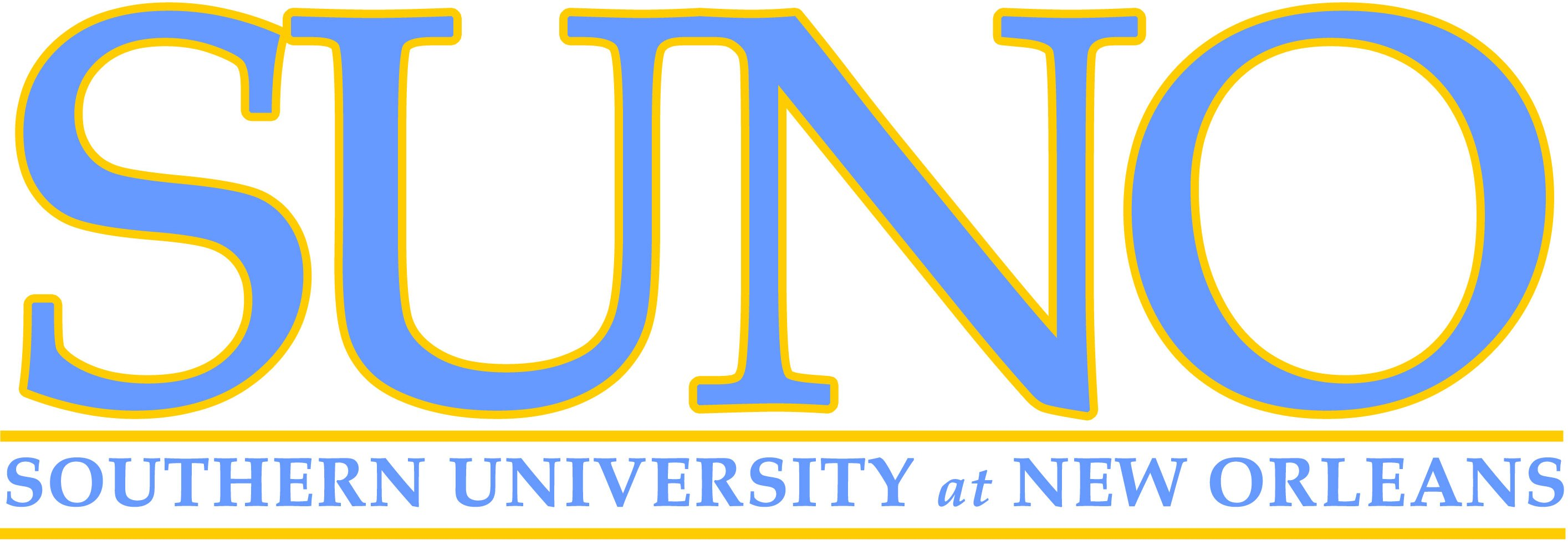

Southern University at New Orleans (also known as SUNO) is a public historically black university in New Orleans, Louisiana. It is a member of the Southern University System and the Thurgood Marshall College Fund.

== History ==
Southern University was founded in New Orleans in 1880 and moved out of the city in 1914 due to logistical concerns as well as pressure from its White neighbors. SUNO was then founded as a branch of Southern by Act 28 of the Extraordinary Session of the Louisiana Legislature of September 4, 1956. On September 21, 1959, SUNO opened its doors on a 17-acre site located in historic Pontchartrain Park, a subdivision of primarily African American single-family residences in eastern New Orleans.

Established as an open community of learners, classes began with 158 freshmen, one building and a faculty of fifteen. The university offered ten courses in four academic disciplines, including Humanities, Science, Social Science and Commerce. The first graduation took place in May 1963 when baccalaureate degrees were awarded to 15 graduates.{{|date=November 2020}}

In 1959, Dr. Felton G. Clark, president of Southern, asked Dr. Emmett W. Bashful to open SUNO. Dr. Bashful began as dean of the university. In 1969, he was named vice president, and he was eventually named chancellor in 1977. Of SUNO's founding, Dr. Bashful wrote, "In August, 1959, Dr. F. G. Clark, then President of Southern University at Baton Rouge, presented my name to the Louisiana State Board of Education as Dean of the projected New Orleans Campus. Several days later, I came to New Orleans and after examining the campus, realized what a monumental task I faced. The one building under construction was hardly near completion; the faculty had been only partially recruited; no office space was then available on campus; and it was expected that classes would begin sometime in September."

=== Expansion and change ===
Over the years several events have affected the direction of SUNO. Within five years SUNO grew rapidly, and during the fall of 1964 the university's enrollment grew to 1,300. On November 8, 1960, the Louisiana Legislature adopted Amendment 26, which said that SUNO should remain an extension of Southern University, thereby precluding any impending status of autonomy for SUNO. In January 1964 Virginia Cox Welch, a white high school teacher, filed a lawsuit in Federal Court against the Louisiana State Board of Education. The litigation, Civil Action No. 14217, resulted in opening the university to all regardless of race or color. In 1975 the management of SUNO was transferred from the Louisiana State Board of Education to the newly created Board of Supervisors of Southern University by virtue of Article 8, Section 7 of the Louisiana Constitution of 1974. The new constitution also designated SUNO as a campus of the Southern University System, creating parity with the other Southern University campuses.

SUNO would later benefit from a consent decree on September 8, 1981. The court order, which was handed down by federal judges as an out-of-court settlement between the State of Louisiana and the Justice Department over the issue of segregation, allowed SUNO to add nine academic programs and also to receive funds to upgrade campus facilities. Despite the order, racial discrimination in the higher education landscape remained an issue. As a result of Civil Action 80–3300 on November 14, 1994, the United States, the State of Louisiana, the governor of Louisiana, the Louisiana Board of Regents, the Boards of Supervisors for Louisiana State University and Southern University and the board of trustees for State Colleges and Universities agreed to a desegregation settlement. The settlement, which was effective through 2004, enabled SUNO to retain its open admissions status and classification as a Four Year-V university. The university, as a result, expected to qualify as a Four Year-IV institution by offering four-year undergraduate programs and graduate programs in specific areas.

As time progressed the university took advantage of valuable opportunities to boost its academic programs. The most notable progress came in SUNO's School of Social Work. Guided by the institution's first dean, Millie McClelland Charles, the School of Social Work blossomed into one of the most recognized programs in the South. As a result, the popularity of the School of Social Work's Master of Social Work program grew. In the fall of 2008, the Master of Social Work program grew to capacity with 150 students and many more candidates on the waiting list.

SUNO's Criminal Justice program also gained notoriety. Offering both undergraduate and graduate degrees, the Criminal Justice program has evolved into a program that delves into seeking community solutions to prevent criminal behavior through the study of the causes of criminal behavior. The program is complemented by studies in the social sciences and has become a program of choice of those seeking career enhancements in law, law enforcement and the justice system.

The sciences garnered a wealth of attention in the early 2000s (decade) when SUNO aggressively implemented components of the Program for Excellence in Mathematics and Computer Technology (PESMaCT) as well as the Louisiana Alliance for Minority Participation (LAMP). Through the programs, university science instructors have been able to increase the number and quality of minority students enrolling in and completing undergraduate and advanced degrees in the sciences, technology and mathematics. Because of the diligent work of the faculty, one of the instructors, Dr. Joe Omojola, received a 2006 Presidential Award for Excellence in Science, Mathematics and Engineering Mentoring from the National Science Foundation.

=== Hurricane Katrina ===
All 11 buildings of SUNO's Park Campus, the original campus at 6400 Press Drive, were completely damaged as a result of the levee breaches caused by Hurricane Katrina and the storm surge later caused by Hurricane Rita. Flood waters grew to as high as eleven feet in the buildings, causing the school's physical plant to require replacement.

The damage caused SUNO to finish its fall 2005 semester on its sister campus in Baton Rouge. Operations as well as classes were conducted at Southern University until a temporary campus was assembled at 6801 Press Drive on land that SUNO owned but had not utilized extensively. After negotiations with the State of Louisiana, the Federal Emergency Management Agency, and the U.S. Army Corps of Engineers the university was able to open a temporary facility, called the North Campus (later to be named the Lake Campus) on February 14, 2006. Until January 2008, SUNO operated completely out of the trailers.

Not only was there physical damage done to the university, but its academics had also been threatened. Twenty of the university's programs were stripped due to the loss of students and faculty. Prior to Katrina SUNO's enrollment exceeded 3,600 students but it was projected that the enrollment would dip to as few as 1,200 students. To the surprise of many, SUNO's enrollment regained more than 2,000 including online students when the university returned to grounds near the Park Campus in the spring of 2006.

By request of the Louisiana Board of Regents, the university added undergraduate degrees in Public Administration, Health Information Systems and Child Development & Family Studies. The university also converted several previously administered undergraduate degrees into Management Information Systems and Business Entrepreneurship, and now offers a master's degree in Management Information Systems as a result of the conversion. In the fall of 2008, the Board of Regents approved the reinstatement of undergraduate degrees in English, History and Mathematics.

The fall of 2008 saw more advancements for SUNO as the student population climbed to 3,105. The university occupied several buildings on its Park Campus since Katrina, and began construction on the first residence halls in the history of the institution, which opened in January 2010. Plans for development of the Lake Campus moved forward with the opening of the Information Technology Center and construction on the College of Business and Public Administration, which will include a $3 million business incubator.

On August 17, 2009, Department of Homeland Security Secretary Napolitano announced that FEMA would provide more than $32 million in additional funding to rebuild four educational buildings at SUNO. The money was marked for replacement of the university's Old Science, New Science, Multipurpose, and Clark education buildings. In total, more than $92 million in FEMA public assistance had been obligated for SUNO, including $40 million since March 2009. Previous funding had helped renovate the university's Cafeteria, Health & Physical Education, and Maintenance buildings.

=== 2011 merger debate ===
On January 18, 2011, Governor Bobby Jindal made a request of the Louisiana Board of Regents to study the feasibility of merging SUNO and the University of New Orleans and moving both institutions under the umbrella of the University of Louisiana System. The study was completed, and the results were delivered to the Board of Regents in a March 14 meeting. Later that evening, Gov. Jindal announced that he would write legislation recommending Alternative B. On March 15, the Board of Regents voted nine to six to accept Gov. Jindal's proposal to recommend the National Center for Higher Education Management Systems' "Alternative B" plan to "include a comprehensive community college and a new multi-unit University of Greater New Orleans. The University of Greater New Orleans would include an urban research university unit and a metropolitan university unit each headed by a chief academic officer under a single president located on the current site of the University of New Orleans." Within that same vote, the Board recommended including the Southern University System's proposal "A Focused Learning Approach to Strengthen the Role of Public Higher Education in Building a Greater New Orleans: The Honoré Center for Undergraduate Student Achievement" named for Southern University graduate and post-Hurricane Katrina hero Gen. Russell Honoré.

Louisiana state Senator Conrad Appel (Dist. 9, Metairie) filed Senate Bill 183 which aimed to create the University of Louisiana at New Orleans. Rep. Tucker later filed House Bill 537 which called for the merging of SUNO and UNO. The next few months resulted in protests from SUNO students, faculty, alumni, and community supporters in addition to highly emotional testimony from those same parties at the Board of Regents' March meeting and the Louisiana House Education and Appropriations Committee meetings.

On May 18, Rep. Tucker pulled SUNO from HB 537 due to a lack of support from his fellow House members. As a result, the bill only called for UNO's transition from the Louisiana State University System to the University of Louisiana System, which eventually approved by the legislature and Gov. Jindal. Because of HB 537's failure, Sen. Appel also removed SUNO from SB 183.

In 2019, the university's regional accreditor placed the New Orleans campus on probation and the university began furloughing employees. Several months later, the New Orleans campus of the university also announced plans to suspend all intercollegiate athletic programs at the end of the 2019–2020 academic year. Partially at the cost of their students, SUNO athletics were reinstated a year later.

== Academics ==
Academic rankings

Master's
- Washington Monthly: 222

Regional
- U.S. News & World Report: RNP (South)

Southern University at New Orleans is accredited by the Southern Association of Colleges and Schools, the Council for Social Work Education, and the National Council for the Accreditation of Teacher Education

Southern University at New Orleans is the only institution in Louisiana to offer an advanced degree in museum studies.

=== Academics ===
The university offers degrees in five colleges and schools:

College of Arts and Sciences

- Bachelor of Arts
- Bachelor of Science
- Bachelor of General Studies

College of Business and Public Administration

- Bachelor of Arts in Public Administration
- Bachelor of Science

College of Education and Human Development

- Bachelor of Arts in Child Development and Family Studies
- Bachelor of Science

College of Social Work

- Bachelor of Arts in Social Welfare

School of Graduate Studies

- Master of Arts
- Master of Science
- Master of Social Work

== Student life ==
Undergraduate demographics as of Fall 2023
| Race and ethnicity | Total |
|---|---|
| Black | 93% |
| Hispanic | 2% |
| Two or more races | 2% |
| White | 2% |
| Unknown | 1% |
Economic diversity
| Low-income (Note: The percentage of students who received an income-based federal Pell grant intended for low-income students.) | 63% |
| Affluent (Note: The percentage of students who are a part of the American middle class at the bare minimum.) | 37% |

There are more than thirty student organizations (academic, religious, NPHC sororities, NPHC fraternities, etc.) that are registered through the Student Activities and Organizations Office. These groups afford students the opportunity to develop organizational, social and communication skills.

== Athletics ==
The Southern–New Orleans (SUNO) athletic teams are called the Knights and Lady Knights. The university is a member of the National Association of Intercollegiate Athletics (NAIA), primarily competing in the HBCU Athletic Conference (HBCUAC), formerly the Gulf Coast Athletic Conference (GCAC), since the 2022–23 academic year; which they were a member on a previous stint from 1986–87 to 2018–19 (their final season before the school suspended its athletics program and eventually re-instating it back).

SUNO competes in five intercollegiate varsity sports: Men's sports included basketball and track & field; while women's sports included basketball, track & field and volleyball.

=== Return ===
On January 20, 2022, SUNO re-instated its athletic program and received an invitation to re-join back to the GCAC, along with Oakwood University (from the United States Collegiate Athletic Association (USCAA)) and Wiley College, effective beginning in July 2022.

=== Facilities ===
The Health and Physical Education Building, nicknamed The Castle, is the 1,200-seat arena for the men's and women's basketball teams and volleyball team. It opened in 1974.

== Notable alumni ==
- Avery Alexander – civil rights activist and former member of the Louisiana House of Representatives
- John Bagneris – member of the Louisiana House of Representatives for District 100 in eastern Orleans Parish since 2016
- Gina Brown – HIV/AIDS activist and social worker
- Viola Mary Johnson Coleman – early African American physician
- Oretha Castle Haley – New Orleans civil rights activist
- Louis Westerfield – first African-American dean of Loyola University New Orleans College of Law and University of Mississippi School of Law
