= Viola Mary Johnson Coleman =

African-American female physician

Viola Mary Johnson Coleman (September 25, 1919 - October 12, 2005) was the first African-American female physician to practice medicine in Midland, Texas. She was active in advocating for the desegregation of schools and for the integration of hospitals in Midland. In 1945, she enlisted the National Association for the Advancement of Colored People (NAACP) in bringing a lawsuit against Louisiana State University medical school for denying her admission based upon her race, a decade before some of the most influential civil rights actions such as in Montgomery and Little Rock. In part due to Coleman's case, NAACP lawyers pursued similar litigation for desegregation of schools in the late 1940s and 1950s, including the U.S. Supreme Court case Sweatt vs Painter. She was known as a compassionate physician and figurehead in the Midland community, never turning anyone away even if they couldn't pay for medical care.

== Early life and education ==
Coleman was born in 1919 in New Iberia, Louisiana, to Jefferson Johnson Sr, a lumber worker, and Ella Johnson, a domestic worker. She had one brother, Jefferson Johnson Jr. In 1951, she married Raymond Coleman, a teacher, (1917-1998) and had two children, Conrad and Reginald

After finishing high school at age 15, Coleman enrolled in Southern University in Louisiana at the Liberal Arts College in the 1930s. She went on to teach at Grambling University. She then decided to study medicine rather than nursing, feeling this was "where she wanted to be."

== NAACP LSU lawsuit ==
In June 1946, Coleman, then known as Viola Johnson, applied to Louisiana State University medical school. At the time, Louisiana was highly segregated and subject to Jim Crow laws. Coleman was part of a group of activists recruited by the Louisiana Colored Teacher's Association and the NAACP to challenge the rejection of applications of black students to majority-white universities based on race. Coleman joined the case along with Charles Hatfield, who was applying to LSU law school. Thurgood Marshall, the future Supreme Court Justice, Robert Carter, and Louis Berry represented them in the case. Both Coleman and Hatfield were rejected. LSU cited race as the determining factor in the decision regarding Coleman. A letter from June 1946 to Viola Johnson from James McGoldrick McLemore, then Chairman of the Louisiana State Board of Supervisors states:

"Dear Miss Johnson, As you no doubt know, the State of Louisiana maintains separate schools for its white and colored students. Louisiana State University does not admit colored students...Southern University, located in Scotlandsville ... is the principal Louisiana university for negroes."

Louisiana, along with other Southern states used part of the Supreme Court law from Gaines v. Canada passed in 1938, which ruled that states had to provide in-state education to black students or create a school that would educate both white and black students, further reinforcing segregationist policies. Many states chose to fund education for black students at different schools, rather than integrate them into all-white universities. Coleman was given funding for her tuition at an out-of-state school. As a result, she ended up attending Meharry Medical College in Tennessee. In April 1947, the 19th District Court in Baton Rouge ruled against Coleman citing her out-state-residency status. It is significant to note that Coleman was forced to seek her education in a different state due to the segregation of schools, and LSU's rejection of her application based on race. In February 1948, she received an encouraging letter from Daniel E. Byrd, then the field secretary for the NAACP in New Orleans:

"Please don't permit those persons whose attitudes and thoughts are dwarfed to the extent that they are antebellum in their philosophy and demeanor to alarm you. Only a handful of our people want integration and it is God's valiant minority who must wage war on the insidious evils; war on a double-barreled basis. In the one barrel aimed, sighted and cocked on the laws, practices, customs and usages that keep us walled in; and the other barrel, in a like manner, cocked on the members of our group, who for a job or personal gain or for even a handout, would aid in the perpetuation of these evils. Our hope is in the youth, whose minds are not enslaved to this inferior status."

Historians agree what happened in Coleman's case was historically significant, occurring at a transitional point in American history when "separate but equal" was being defined, and before the later Civil Rights Movement of the 1960's. By this time, Coleman had left to Texas, as the case had garnered attention in the media and resulted in her receiving death threats.

== Medical career ==
Coleman initially wanted to practice medicine in Louisiana. After completing her internship in Coney Island, New York Coleman and her husband found themselves short of the funds needed to open a medical practice. Louisiana banks would not loan them money and Coleman refused to make her parents put up their homes as security for a loan. As a result, she began looking for work in Fort Worth, Texas. She was told that nearby Midland was building a hospital and were opening staff positions to black workers, which was unusual for the segregated South. Coleman submitted her credentials for Midland Memorial Hospital and was accepted immediately, and was also given a loan to start a private practice.

During her time at Midland Memorial Hospital, she integrated the cafeteria and hospital rooms, established a pre-natal clinic, was integral in establishing emergency and ambulance services and served as President of the Midland County Medical Society in 1975.

Coleman was a passionate advocate for equal education in Midland, which in the 1960s and '70s was segregated. She was a plaintiff in the 1975 court case Intervenors-appellants, v. Midland Independent School District, which "alleged that the Midland Independent School District (MISD) was maintaining separate schools for black and Mexican-American students at the elementary school level."

== Legacy ==
Coleman died on October 12, 2005, at her home in Midland at the age of 86. Coleman High School in Midland, Texas is named after her. Coleman never mentioned to her family what happened during the lawsuit against LSU. After her death, her sons found her letters documenting the experience and donated them to the University of Texas Permian Basin Library Archive in 2009. Coleman has received numerous awards and honors including the Jefferson Award from the American Institute of Public Service in 1992. Her granddaughter, Kathleen Green, has followed in her footsteps and is a practicing physician and assistant professor of obstetrics and gynecology at the University of Florida. A bust statue in honor of Coleman was unveiled at Midland Memorial Hospital in 2008.
