= 2004 West Virginia Democratic presidential primary =

Elections in West Virginia

- May 11, 2004

39 Democratic National Convention delegates (28 pledged, 11 unpledged) The number of pledged delegates received is determined by the popular vote
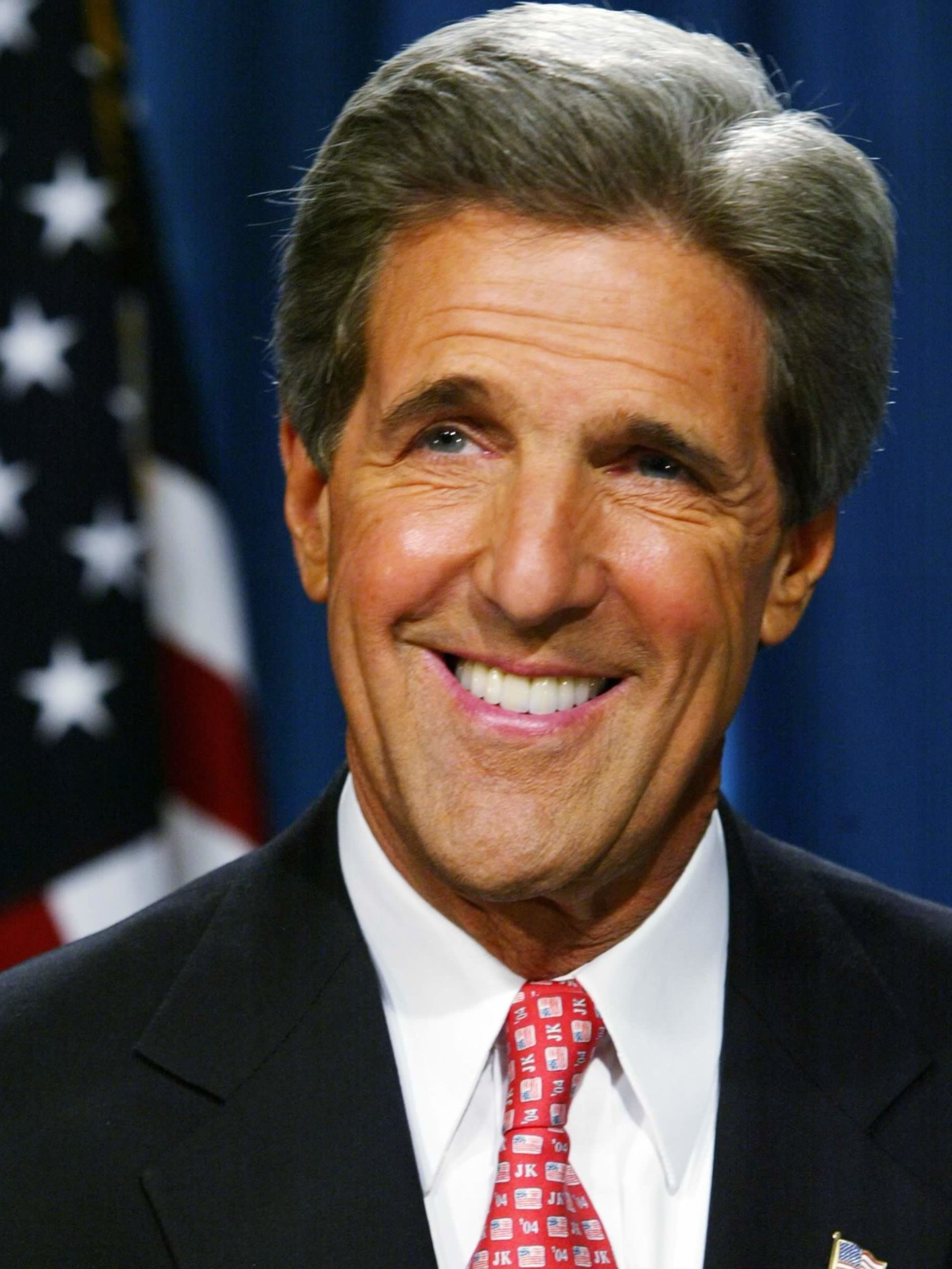

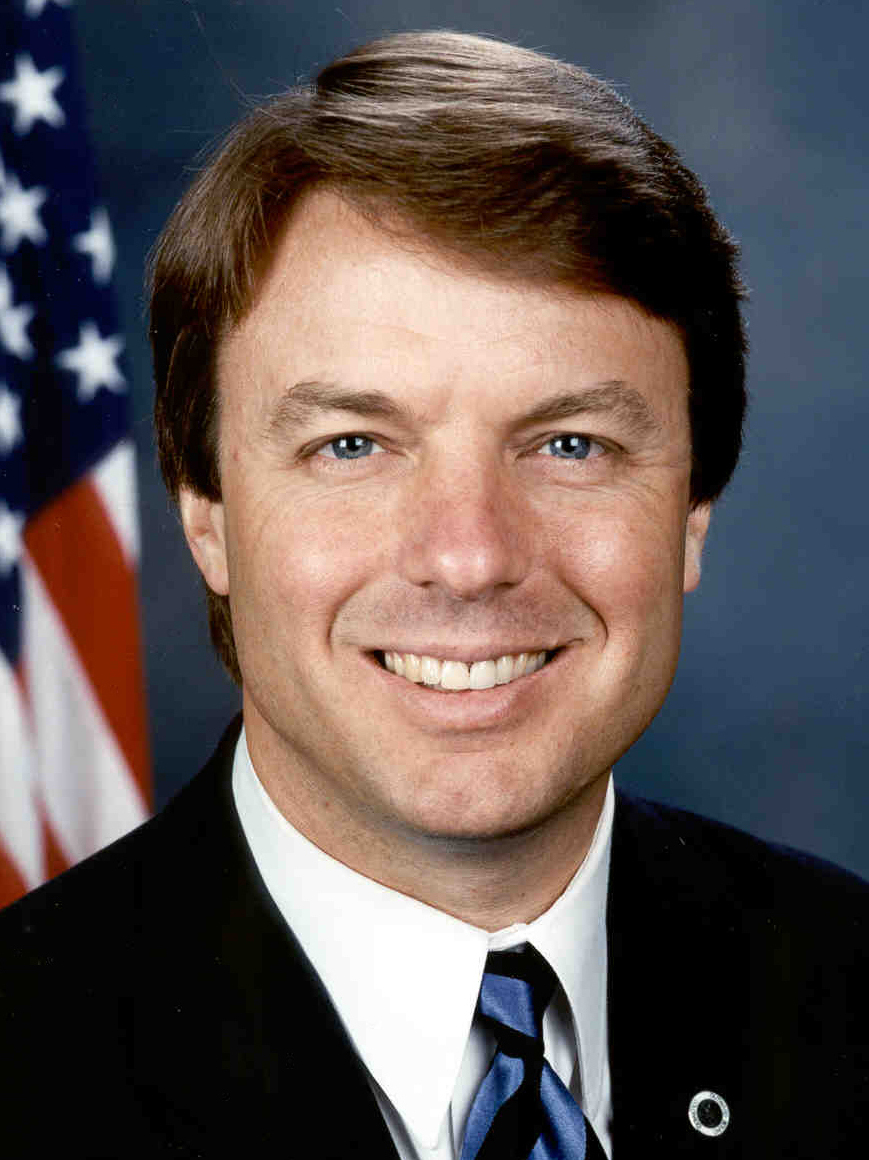

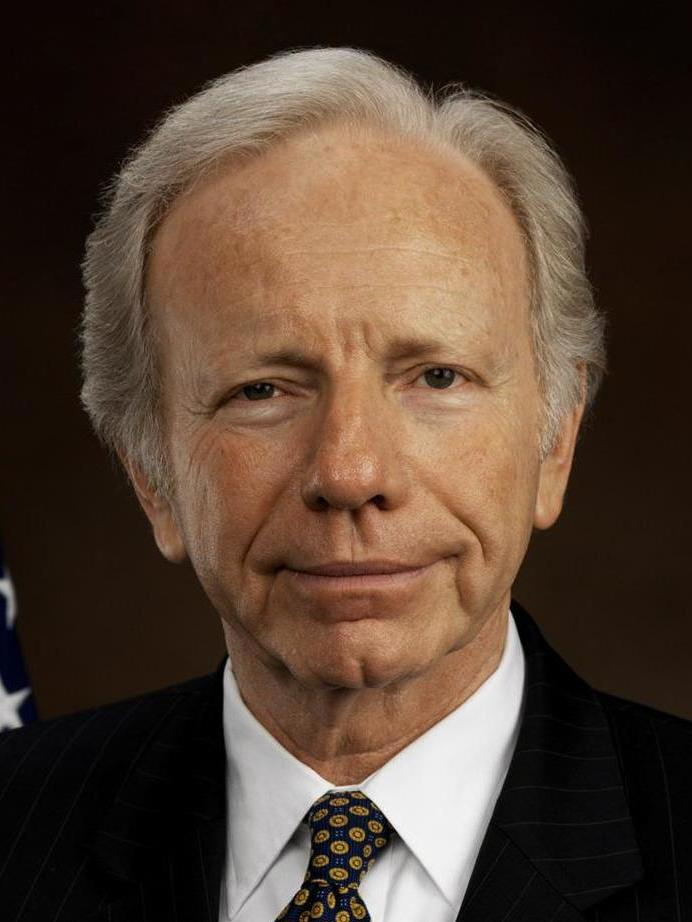
Candidate	John Kerry	John Edwards (withdrawn)	Joe Lieberman (withdrawn)
Home state	Massachusetts	North Carolina	Connecticut
Delegate count	28	0	0
Popular vote	175,065	33,950	13,881
Percentage	69.24%	13.43%	5.49%
- County results Kerry: 60-70% 70-80%

The 2004 West Virginia Democratic presidential primary was held on May 11 in the U.S. state of West Virginia as one of the Democratic Party's statewide nomination contests ahead of the 2004 presidential election.

== Results ==
2004 West Virginia Democratic primary
Candidate	Votes	%	Delegates
John Kerry	175,065	69.24	28
John Edwards (withdrawn)	33,950	13.43	0
Joe Lieberman (withdrawn)	13,881	5.49	0
Howard Dean (withdrawn)	10,576	4.18	0
Wesley Clark (withdrawn)	9,170	3.63	0
Dennis Kucinich	6,114	2.42	0
Lyndon LaRouche	4,083	1.61	0
Total	252,839	100%	28

County	Kerry		Edwards		Lieberman		Dean		Clark		Kucinich		LaRouche		Margin		Total
County	#	%	#	%	#	%	#	%	#	%	#	%	#	%	#	%	Total
Barbour	1,585	70.57%	259	11.53%	122	5.43%	86	3.83%	105	4.67%	50	2.23%	39	1.74%	1,326	59.04%	2,246
Berkeley	2,981	67.12%	579	13.04%	247	5.56%	273	6.15%	182	4.10%	84	1.89%	95	2.14%	2,402	54.09%	4,441
Boone	4,491	75.08%	764	12.77%	223	3.73%	167	2.79%	147	2.46%	109	1.82%	81	1.35%	3,727	62.30%	5,982
Braxton	2,215	68.13%	464	14.27%	142	4.37%	131	4.03%	126	3.88%	110	3.38%	63	1.94%	1,751	53.86%	3,251
Brooke	3,174	70.58%	512	11.39%	258	5.74%	210	4.67%	150	3.34%	147	3.27%	46	1.02%	2,662	59.20%	4,497
Cabell	8,941	69.35%	2,080	16.13%	753	5.84%	310	2.40%	348	2.70%	344	2.67%	116	0.90%	6,861	53.22%	12,892
Calhoun	841	65.04%	192	14.85%	53	4.10%	67	5.18%	52	4.02%	60	4.64%	28	2.17%	649	50.19%	1,293
Clay	1,467	66.29%	288	13.01%	110	4.97%	101	4.56%	130	5.87%	72	3.25%	45	2.03%	1,179	53.28%	2,213
Doddridge	363	68.88%	56	10.63%	22	4.17%	15	2.85%	34	6.45%	29	5.50%	8	1.52%	307	58.25%	527
Fayette	4,865	69.09%	987	14.02%	322	4.57%	369	5.24%	282	4.00%	123	1.75%	94	1.33%	3,878	55.07%	7,042
Gilmer	937	62.63%	220	14.71%	82	5.48%	61	4.08%	75	5.01%	92	6.15%	29	1.94%	717	47.93%	1,496
Grant	232	70.09%	49	14.80%	12	3.63%	12	3.63%	15	4.53%	6	1.81%	5	1.51%	183	55.29%	331
Greenbrier	3,470	65.07%	878	16.46%	274	5.14%	224	4.20%	198	3.71%	114	2.14%	175	3.28%	2,592	48.60%	5,333
Hampshire	1,387	63.68%	318	14.60%	139	6.38%	96	4.41%	87	3.99%	45	2.07%	106	4.87%	1,069	49.08%	2,178
Hancock	3,955	70.12%	657	11.65%	333	5.90%	235	4.17%	199	3.53%	153	2.71%	108	1.91%	3,298	58.48%	5,640
Hardy	1,066	62.38%	273	15.97%	101	5.91%	81	4.74%	81	4.74%	17	0.99%	90	5.27%	793	46.40%	1,709
Harrison	8,120	69.38%	1,411	12.06%	892	7.62%	459	3.92%	414	3.54%	245	2.09%	162	1.38%	6,709	57.33%	11,703
Jackson	2,732	76.40%	408	11.41%	131	3.66%	125	3.50%	60	1.68%	75	2.10%	45	1.26%	2,324	64.99%	3,576
Jefferson	3,310	75.73%	393	8.99%	201	4.60%	172	3.94%	124	2.84%	107	2.45%	64	1.46%	2,917	66.74%	4,371
Kanawha	19,675	70.81%	3,999	14.39%	1,345	4.84%	906	3.26%	1,032	3.71%	590	2.12%	237	0.85%	15,676	56.42%	27,784
Lewis	1,540	64.11%	355	14.78%	151	6.29%	132	5.50%	117	4.87%	60	2.50%	47	1.96%	1,185	49.33%	2,402
Lincoln	3,290	76.28%	456	10.57%	125	2.90%	141	3.27%	109	2.53%	133	3.08%	59	1.37%	2,834	65.71%	4,313
Logan	5,093	74.83%	611	8.98%	284	4.17%	327	4.80%	269	3.95%	136	2.00%	86	1.26%	4,482	65.85%	6,806
Marion	8,215	71.09%	1,381	11.95%	736	6.37%	397	3.44%	398	3.44%	205	1.77%	223	1.93%	6,834	59.14%	11,555
Marshall	3,719	68.74%	748	13.83%	299	5.53%	263	4.86%	152	2.81%	161	2.98%	68	1.26%	2,971	54.92%	5,410
Mason	3,112	75.13%	415	10.02%	158	3.81%	186	4.49%	105	2.54%	104	2.51%	62	1.50%	2,697	65.11%	4,142
McDowell	3,309	71.30%	668	14.39%	168	3.62%	149	3.21%	145	3.12%	112	2.41%	90	1.94%	2,641	56.91%	4,641
Mercer	4,640	60.84%	1,519	19.92%	559	7.33%	307	4.03%	358	4.69%	113	1.48%	130	1.70%	3,121	40.93%	7,626
Mineral	1,738	66.51%	312	11.94%	156	5.97%	195	7.46%	98	3.75%	63	2.41%	51	1.95%	1,426	54.57%	2,613
Mingo	5,004	75.34%	605	9.11%	241	3.63%	314	4.73%	209	3.15%	116	1.75%	153	2.30%	4,399	66.23%	6,642
Monongalia	6,093	66.74%	989	10.83%	773	8.47%	480	5.26%	314	3.44%	351	3.84%	129	1.41%	5,104	55.91%	9,129
Monroe	1,232	65.46%	351	18.65%	87	4.62%	76	4.04%	64	3.40%	28	1.49%	44	2.34%	881	46.81%	1,882
Morgan	656	70.39%	121	12.98%	46	4.94%	39	4.18%	34	3.65%	19	2.04%	17	1.82%	535	57.40%	932
Nicholas	3,064	68.93%	619	13.93%	275	6.19%	180	4.05%	160	3.60%	85	1.91%	62	1.39%	2,445	55.01%	4,445
Ohio	4,238	68.37%	738	11.91%	506	8.16%	283	4.57%	149	2.40%	215	3.47%	70	1.13%	3,500	56.46%	6,199
Pendleton	1,010	70.73%	178	12.46%	51	3.57%	58	4.06%	52	3.64%	27	1.89%	52	3.64%	832	58.26%	1,428
Pleasants	810	67.56%	202	16.85%	67	5.59%	39	3.25%	29	2.42%	22	1.83%	30	2.50%	608	50.71%	1,199
Pocahontas	950	67.52%	169	12.01%	64	4.55%	61	4.34%	62	4.41%	45	3.20%	56	3.98%	781	55.51%	1,407
Preston	1,836	66.14%	336	12.10%	177	6.38%	135	4.86%	151	5.44%	69	2.49%	72	2.59%	1,500	54.03%	2,776
Putnam	4,596	70.18%	863	13.18%	286	4.37%	308	4.70%	271	4.14%	146	2.23%	79	1.21%	3,733	57.00%	6,549
Raleigh	5,853	62.67%	1,668	17.86%	607	6.50%	508	5.44%	323	3.46%	245	2.62%	135	1.45%	4,185	44.81%	9,339
Randolph	3,223	64.18%	698	13.90%	284	5.66%	292	5.81%	270	5.38%	147	2.93%	108	2.15%	2,525	50.28%	5,022
Ritchie	451	67.51%	96	14.37%	28	4.19%	27	4.04%	24	3.59%	33	4.94%	9	1.35%	355	53.14%	668
Roane	1,367	74.29%	207	11.25%	49	2.66%	75	4.08%	75	4.08%	54	2.93%	13	0.71%	1,160	63.04%	1,840
Summers	1,560	64.49%	434	17.94%	128	5.29%	110	4.55%	98	4.05%	51	2.11%	38	1.57%	1,126	46.55%	2,419
Taylor	1,589	67.36%	320	13.57%	132	5.60%	97	4.11%	128	5.43%	70	2.97%	23	0.97%	1,269	53.79%	2,359
Tucker	887	64.74%	228	16.64%	71	5.18%	81	5.91%	50	3.65%	28	2.04%	25	1.82%	659	48.10%	1,370
Tyler	592	67.89%	105	12.04%	58	6.65%	45	5.16%	32	3.67%	28	3.21%	12	1.38%	487	55.85%	872
Upshur	1,396	70.47%	245	12.37%	74	3.74%	101	5.10%	105	5.30%	38	1.92%	22	1.11%	1,151	58.10%	1,981
Wayne	5,517	72.13%	921	12.04%	385	5.03%	261	3.41%	260	3.40%	156	2.04%	149	1.95%	4,596	60.09%	7,649
Webster	1,715	69.32%	342	13.82%	98	3.96%	77	3.11%	123	4.97%	63	2.55%	56	2.26%	1,373	55.50%	2,474
Wetzel	2,259	65.54%	563	16.33%	200	5.80%	145	4.21%	122	3.54%	119	3.45%	39	1.13%	1,696	49.20%	3,447
Wirt	638	68.60%	113	12.15%	56	6.02%	45	4.84%	32	3.44%	29	3.12%	17	1.83%	525	56.45%	930
Wood	5,333	68.01%	977	12.46%	496	6.32%	428	5.46%	311	3.97%	201	2.56%	96	1.22%	4,356	55.55%	7,842
Wyoming	2,733	67.88%	610	15.15%	244	6.06%	114	2.83%	130	3.23%	70	1.74%	125	3.10%	2,123	52.73%	4,026
Totals	175,065	69.24%	33,950	13.43%	13,881	5.49%	10,576	4.18%	9,170	3.63%	6,114	2.42%	4,083	1.61%	141,115	55.81%	252,839
Source: West Virginia Blue Book 2004 (page 594)
