= Gina Brown =

HIV/AIDS activist (born 1966)

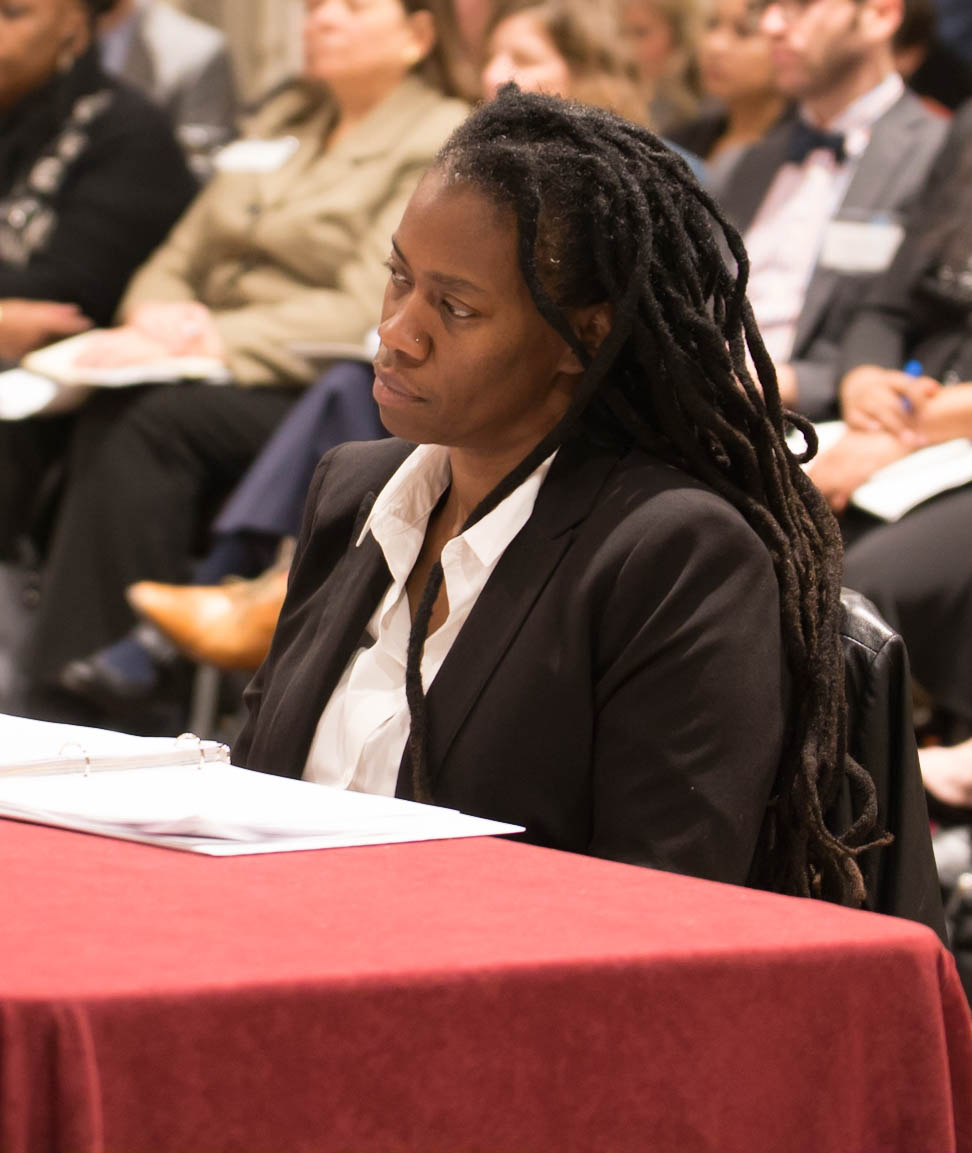
- Brown pictured in 2015 while serving on the Presidential Advisory Council on HIV/AIDS
- Born: January 15, 1966 (age 60); Pittsburg, California
- Education: Southern University at New Orleans (B.A., M.S.W.)
- Occupations: Social worker and HIV/AIDS activist
- Years active: 2012–current
- Organization(s): Presidential Advisory Council on HIV/AIDS, resigned 2017, Southern AIDS Coalition
- Known for: HIV-positive advocacy
- Board member of: CrescentCare Health Board of Trustees, Black AIDS Institute, The Well Projects

Gina M. Brown (born January 15, 1966) is an American HIV/AIDS activist and social worker. After experiencing childhood trauma and overcoming a drug addiction, Brown was diagnosed with HIV in 1994. Upon her diagnosis, she became a social worker to raise awareness about the disease and remove stigma from HIV-positive people and people of color. Brown previously served on the Presidential Advisory Council on HIV/AIDS and works towards decriminalizing HIV in the Southern United States.

== Biography ==
Gina Brown was born on January 15, 1966 in Pittsburg, California. When she was four years old, her family moved to New Orleans. There, she suffered sexual abuse from a cousin. As a teenager, Brown felt pressure to sleep with older men and fell into drug addiction.

=== Diagnosis ===
In 1994, while pregnant with a daughter, Brown learned she was HIV-positive. It was two years after she had become clean from drugs. At the time of her diagnosis, she was certain she would die and felt stigma from some medical professionals throughout her pregnancy. Others started her on AZT medical study, and her daughter was born HIV-negative.

=== Higher education ===
In 2005, Brown first told her story of living with HIV to a local newspaper in Dallas, Texas where she was living at the time. After the interview, Brown was encouraged by feedback from women throughout the state who told her that her story inspired them to seek treatment. Brown realized the health consequences that shame and self-isolation had on HIV-positive women in the South. The reception encouraged Brown to enroll in a course for social work, in an effort to help more women living with HIV. Brown graduated with a Bachelor of Social Work from the Southern University at New Orleans in 2011, and earned a Master's degree in Social Work in 2012.

=== Advocacy ===
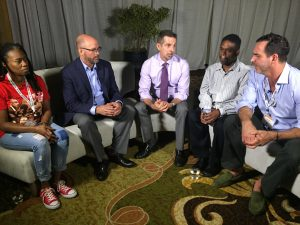
Gina Brown (far left) at a roundtable at the 2016 U.S. Conference on AIDS in Hollywood, Florida.

After graduation, Brown worked as an organizer for several advocacy organizations, including AIDS United and the Southern AIDS Coalition. Brown's social work highlights the roles of stigma, trauma and medical outcomes when it comes to HIV care. In Louisiana, where Brown lives, HIV transmission is criminalized. Brown's work highlights how these laws prevent HIV positive people from being open about their diagnoses, and seeking care. Brown was later appointed to serve on the Presidential Advisory Council on HIV/AIDS (PACHA) as well as other boards related to confronting HIV and the stigma surrounding it in the South.

=== PACHA resignation ===
In 2017, Brown resigned from her role on the Presidential Advisory Council on HIV/AIDS with five other members in protest over the Trump administration's approach to HIV policy. In December 2017, President Trump fired the remaining members of the council.

In 2018, Brown publicly disclosed she was bisexual, in an effort to remove stigma and encourage LGBTQ+ women to be open about their HIV status.

=== Later career ===
In 2019, Brown commemorated the 25th anniversary of her HIV diagnosis. Through treatment by the Ryan White HIV/AIDS program, HIV is no longer detectable in her blood. Today, Brown continues to work as a community manager for HIV and AIDS related epidemic planning.
