= Ligia Peralta =

Dominican-born American pediatrician

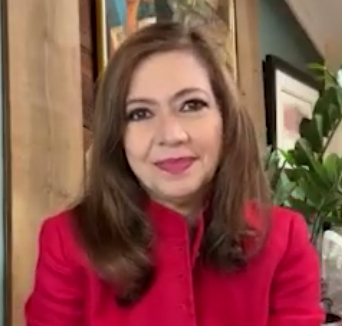
- Peralta in 2025
- Born: 1961 (age 64–65); Dominican Republic
- Education: Universidad Nacional Pedro Henríquez Ureña (MD)
- Occupation: Pediatrician

Ligia Peralta (born 1961) is a Dominican-born doctor of pediatrics and adolescent medicine in Maryland. Her research focuses on HIV and the transmission of HIV in adolescents, specifically those from under-served communities.

Peralta has served in several medical organizations and advisory boards, including the Presidential Advisory Council on HIV/AIDS (PACHA), the Society for Pediatric Research, the Association for Academic Minority Physicians, the Society of Adolescent Medicine, and the Advisory Board of the National Hispanic Medical Association, among others.

== Early life, education, and career ==
Peralta was born in 1961 in the Dominican Republic. Her father, Ruben Peralta, was a surgeon in the United States and Dominican Republic, having held fellowships at institutions such as Harvard Medical School, University of Massachusetts Medical School, Massachusetts General Hospital, and Universidad Nacional Pedro Henríquez Ureña. As a child, Peralta would accompany her father to remote locations on the island to administer free medical screenings and vaccinations. These experiences with her father sparked her love for and commitment to science and her community.

In 1985, Peralta graduated from Universidad Nacional Pedro Henríquez Ureña with her M.D.From there, she completed her residency at the Yale-New Haven Waterbury Hospital Health Center and University of Connecticut from 1987 - 1990. Upon graduation from residency, Peralta was granted a fellowship at the University of Maryland Medical Center in Baltimore, Maryland. Here, she worked with Dr. Felix Heald, who founded the University of Maryland's adolescent medicine program.

Peralta was inducted into the Maryland Women's Hall of Fame in 2011 for her HIV epidemic efforts.

Currently she is Associate Professor of Pediatrics and Epidemiology, Chief Division of Adolescent and Young Adult Medicine, and Director of the Adolescent HIV Program of the Department of Pediatrics, University of Maryland School of Medicine.

== Community service ==
Peralta developed the One Stop Shopping program, where adolescents can receive several different health services in one location; services include specialized exams, dental care, free HIV testing and counseling, and sex and substance abuse counseling. Peralta currently runs Star Track, a clinic in Baltimore at the University of Maryland Medical campus. In addition to her clinic, Peralta also helped establish the Health on the Boards clinic in Ocean City, Maryland, as well as a not-for-profit organization dedicated to her father called Casa Ruben, and the first Spanish Mini Medical school to assist immigrants in the medical field re-enter medicine in the United States.

Alongside her work in the United States, Peralta has also helped address the issue of HIV internationally. She has worked in Latin America, Thailand, Russia, United Arab Emirates, Croatia, Tunisia, and South Africa.
