= Denise Stokes =

American motivational speaker, consultant, and HIV activist

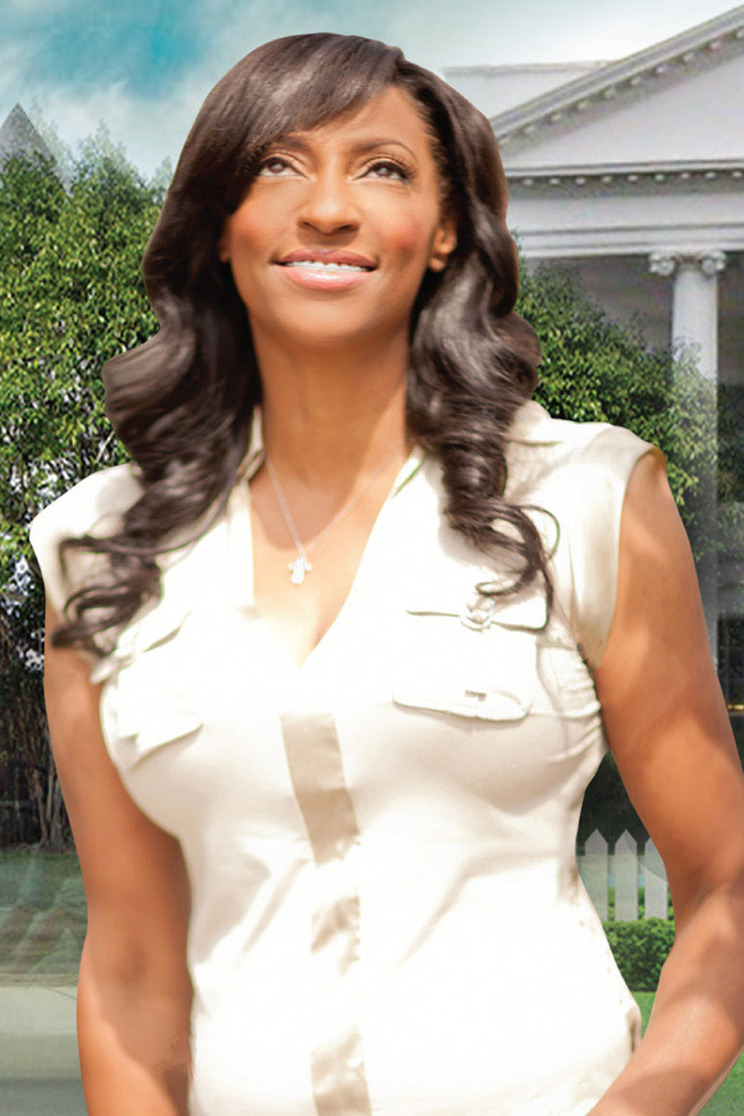
- Stokes in 2012
- Born: March 31, 1969 (age 57); Manhattan
- Occupation: HIV activist
- Organization: Presidential Advisory Council on HIV/AIDS

Denise Stokes (born March 31, 1969) is an American HIV activist and consultant. She is best known for her role on the Presidential Advisory Council on HIV/AIDS and for her activism in support of her fellow HIV-positive individuals.

== Biography ==
Stokes was born in Manhattan and raised in Atlanta, Georgia. At a young age, her goal was to study poetry at Harvard University or UCLA. At age 13, she was raped by a construction worker in Savannah, Georgia. At 16, she decided she wanted to join the U.S. military, but was turned away by the recruiter, who stated that she had contracted HIV and that she'd "die before you turn 21". At that time, she believed she had contracted the disease from her boyfriend, who was bisexual, but she later learned she had contracted the disease from when she was raped.

When she told her mother she was HIV-positive, she was forced out of the house to protect the rest of the family, and lived at a bowling alley for the remainder of her high school while working at a fast food restaurant.

She slowly began becoming addicted to drugs, first alcohol, then cannabis, and eventually crack cocaine. She swapped sex for drugs, and while she did use condoms, she did not inform her partners that she was positive for HIV. The one time she did disclose it, to a man trying to force himself on her, he broke her jaw. She also worked many jobs, including selling life insurance. She started checking herself into drug treatment facilities after being harassed by a group of teenage drug dealers. She subsequently worked with an AIDS-supporting nonprofit to do outreach work. She has recounted doctors misprescribing her with a medication that caused skin lesions and being required to wait outside in line for hours for medication, collapsing in her own urine, while hospital employees stepped over her.

During the Clinton administration, she served on the Presidential Advisory Council on HIV/AIDS, where she gave a speech at announcing of the HIV/AIDS Initiative for Minority Communities and was acknowledged by President Bill Clinton. She also featured in the government campaign to promote the use of condoms, starring in two ads.

She spoke at the 2004 Democratic National Convention, where her speech focused on AIDS issues. She spoke between Governor Kathleen Sebelius and Mayor Don Plusquellic.

She is also a frequent public speaker. She served as a spokesperson for the Rap it Up campaign for condoms, and contributed to James Adler's Memento Mori.

She released a spoken-word poem CD, The Glass Staircase, on her birthday March 31, 2002. She is also the author of a memoir, From The Crack House To The White House.
