= Presidential Advisory Council on HIV/AIDS =

- Great Seal of the United States

Agency overview
- Formed: July 27, 1995; 31 years ago
- Jurisdiction: U.S. Government
- Agency executives: John Weisman, Co-Chair; Carl Schmid, Co-Chair

The Presidential Advisory Council on HIV/AIDS (PACHA) advises the White House and the secretary of health and human services on the US government's response to the AIDS epidemic. The commission was formed by President Bill Clinton in 1995 and each president since has renewed the council's charter.

== History ==
In 1987, Ronald Reagan appointed the President's Commission on the HIV Epidemic (1987–88) to investigate the AIDS epidemic. This was followed by the National Commission on AIDS (1989–1993).

These presidential inquiries into HIV were predecessors to PACHA, formed by Bill Clinton in 1995.

Six members resigned from PACHA in protest of President Donald Trump's health policies in June 2017, and the remaining ten members were dismissed by Trump on 28 December 2017. While PACHA did not meet in 2018, it was restaffed in 2019 and reconvened in March, June, and October 2019.

== Members ==
=== 2025 members ===
As of the end of the Biden administration in January 2025, PACHA's website listed 32 members and five staff. Trump took office on January 20, and five days later, Senate committee hearings began regarding his nomination of Robert F. Kennedy Jr. for Secretary of Health and Human Services. On February 1, all the PACHA member and staff names were removed from the website. The Senate confirmed Kennedy to the position on February 13. He swiftly fired ten thousand federal health employees, resulting in the closure of the Office of Infectious Diseases & HIV Policy, which had supported PACHA. In April, Tori Cooper said she was "technically" still a member of PACHA but expected Trump to officially terminate the council "any second now".

=== 2019 members ===
On Dec. 11, 2018, Secretary Alex Azar of the U.S. Department of Health and Human Services nominated Carl Schmid and John Weisman to serve as PACHA co-chairs when the council reconvened on March 14–15, 2019. Schmid is deputy executive director of The AIDS Institute, and a longtime leader and activist on HIV issues. Weisman is the secretary of health for Washington state and past president of the Association of State and Territorial Health Officers.

At that time, the PACHA members were:

Office	Image	Incumbent	Career and notes	In office
Co-chair		John Wiesman	Washington State Secretary of Health	2018–present
Co-chair		Carl Schmid	Deputy director at the AIDS Institute	2018–present
Member		Michael Saag	Director of the University of Alabama at Birmingham Center for AIDS Research	2019–present
Member		Robert A. Schwartz	Professor and head of dermatology at Rutgers University	2019–present
Member		Marc Meachem	Head of External Affairs at ViiV Healthcare	2019–present
Member	Tori Cooper Consultant and Director of Strategic Outreach and Training at Human Rights Campaign ‘’’Member’’’	Gregg Alton	Chief patient officer at Gilead Sciences	2019–present
Member		Ada Stewart	Lead provider at Eau Claire Cooperative Health Centers	2019–present
Member		Wendy Holman	Chief executive officer at Ridgeback Biotherapeutics	2019–present
Member		Rafaelé Roberto Narváez	Director of health programs at Latinos Salud	2019–present
Member		Justin C. Smith	Behavioral scientist, Rollins School of Public Health, Emory University	2019–present
Member		John Sapero	Office chief, HIV prevention program, Arizona Department of Health Services	2019–present

=== Former members ===
Through 2018, the HIV.gov website (run by the U.S. Department of Health & Human Services) was not updated and continued to display two previous PACHA staff: B. Kaye Hayes, MPA, executive director, and Caroline Talev, MPA, public health analyst.

- Bruce G. Weniger, MD, MPH (original PACHA member 1995–2000) [formal self-introduction 1995-07-27, as archived at Clinton Presidential Library
- Denise Stokes - HIV+ activist
- Nancy Mahon JD, PACHA chairperson – senior vice president, M.A.C Cosmetics; global executive director, Mac AIDS Fund
- David Holtgrave PhD, PACHA Vice-chair – professor and chair, Department of Health, Behavior and Society; Johns Hopkins Bloomberg School of Public Health, Baltimore, Maryland
- Ada Adimora MD MPH – professor, School of Medicine, professor of epidemiology, Gillings School of Global Public Health, University of North Carolina at Chapel Hill
- Jeffrey S. Akman MD – vice president for health affairs, George Washington University; dean, George Washington School of Medicine and Health Sciences
- Oliver Clyde Allen III – presiding bishop, United Progressive Pentecostal Fellowship of Churches, Atlanta, Georgia
- Lucy A. Bradley-Springer PhD RN ACRN FAAN – editor, Journal of the Association of Nurses in AIDS Care, associate professor emerita, University of Colorado, Denver, Colorado
- Gina M. Brown MSW – planning council co-ordinator, New Orleans Regional AIDS Planning Council
- Debra Fraser-Howze — Founder, National Black Leadership Commission on AIDS
- Ulysses W. Burley III MD MPH – program director, Evangelical Lutheran Church, Chicago, Illinois
- Nicholas A. Carlisle JD – executive director, Southern AIDS Coalition
- Vignetta Charles PhD – chief science officer, ETR Associates
- Cecilia Chung – senior strategist, Transgender Law Center
- William H. Collier – head North America, VIIV Healthcare, Research Triangle Park, North Carolina
- Michelle Collins-Ogle MD FAAP AAHIVS – director, infectious diseases, Warren-Vance Community Health Center Inc., Henderson, North Carolina
- Yvette Flunder D. Min. – founder and senior pastor, City of Refuge United Church of Christ, Presiding Bishop, The Fellowship of Affirming Ministries, Oakland, California
- Grissel Granados MSW – project coordinator, Children's Hospital Los Angeles
- Jen Kates PhD – Chac liaison, director of global, health and HIV policy
- Gabriel Maldonado MBA – executive director and CEO, Truevolution, Riverside, California
- Patrick Sean Sullivan, DVM, PhD - Professor, Emory University Rollins School of Public Health, Atlanta Georgia
- Ligia Peralta MD FAAP FSAHM AAHIVS – president and CEO, Casa Ruben Foundation, commissioner, Maryland Health Care Commission
- Harlan Pruden – Two-Spirit Community organizer, Vancouver, Canada
- Scott A. Schoettes JD – HIV project director/senior attorney, Lambda Legal, Chicago, Illinois
- Lawrence Stallworth II – project assistant and HIV prevention specialist, Abounding Prosperity Inc.
- Elizabeth Styffe RN MN – director, HIV/AIDS ad orphan care initiatives, Saddleback Valley Community Church
- Mildred Williamson PhD MSW – director, research and regulatory affairs, Cook County Health and Hospitals System, Chicago, Illinois
- Thomas A. Coburn, M.D., former co-chair – an obstetrician and former Republican congressman from Oklahoma who gained a national reputation for his opposition to safer sex as a way to prevent HIV infections. Dr. Coburn is currently serving as the junior senator from Oklahoma.
- Louis Wade Sullivan, M.D., former co-chair – President's Office, Morehouse School of Medicine, Sullivan was the Secretary of Health and Human Services during the George H. W. Bush administration
- Rosa M. Biaggi, M.P.H., M.P.A – Connecticut Department of Public Health
- Charles W. Blackwell – served as the council's only Native American member from 1997 to 2001.
- Jacqueline S. Clements – Lincoln Community Health Center. Clements is an HIV testing counselor in rural North Carolina who is living with HIV and lost her husband and child to AIDS.
- Mildred Freeman – director, Health Education Division, National Association for Equal Opportunity in Higher Education
- John F. Galbraith – president and CEO, Catholic Medical Mission Board
- Edward C. Green, Ph.D. – senior research scientist, Harvard Center for Population and Development Studies
- David Greer – a marketing and communications consultant in Philadelphia. He is living with HIV.
- Cheryl-Anne Hall
- Jane Hu, Ph.D. – CEO and founder, China Foundation, a philanthropic think tank
- Karen Ivantic-Doucette, M.S.N, FNP, ACRN – Marquette University College of Nursing
- Rashida Jolley
- Franklyn N. Judson, M.D. – professor and director, Denver Public Health Department
- Abner Mason – executive director, AIDS Responsibility Project
- Sandra S. McDonald – president/founder, OUTREACH, Inc
- Joe S. McIlhaney, M.D.
- Henry McKinnell Jr., Ph.D. – chairman and CEO Pfizer Inc
- Brent Tucker Minor – co-chair of the Ryan White Planning Council. He is living with HIV.
- Jose A. Montero, M.D. – associate professor of medicine, University of South Florida
- Dandrick Moton – director, community and youth relations, Choosing to Excel
- Beny Primm, MD – The Addiction Research and Treatment Corp.
- David Reznik, D.D.S. – chief, dental service, Grady Health System. Reznik is an expert in oral health care for people living with HIV, and serves on the Ryan White Planning Council of Metropolitan Atlanta.
- Debbie Rock – executive director, Baltimore Pediatric HIV Program, Inc
- Reverend Edwin Sanders II – senior servant, Metropolitan Interdenominational Church
- Prem Sharma, D.D.S., M.S. – associate dean emeritus, Marquette School of Dentistry
- Lisa Mai Shoemaker – HIV/AIDS activist/motivational speaker
- Anita Smith – Children's AIDS Fund
- Don Sneed – executive director, Renaissance III, a non-profit organization providing AIDS-related services in south Texas. Sneed is a former addict, and is living with HIV.
- M. Monica Sweeney, M.D., M.P.H. – assistant clinical professor of preventive medicine, SUNY Health Science Center of Brooklyn
- Ram Yogev, MD – professor of pediatrics, Northwestern University Medical School and medical director, pediatric and maternal HIV infection, Ann & Robert H. Lurie Children's Hospital of Chicago
- Bob Bollinger MD, MPH-Professor of Infectious Diseases and International Health Johns Hopkins University

== Criticism ==
Critics have said they lack confidence in PACHA and note that the council as reorganized under President Bush held only two meetings in 2002 and issued only five recommendations to the White House. By comparison, the President's Commission on the HIV Epidemic (Watkins Commission) submitted 597 recommendations to the Reagan Administration.

The Union of Concerned Scientists released a report in February 2004 entitled Scientific Integrity in Policymaking that said that President Bush intentionally appointed under-qualified individuals to PACHA as part of a broader effort to manipulate the government's scientific advisory system by providing the appearance of expert advice while controlling the advice given.

Critics pointed to the appointment of Joseph McIlhaney, a Texas-based doctor known for rejecting the use of condoms to prevent the spread of HIV and other sexually transmitted diseases and for his advocacy of abstinence-only programs despite negligible evidence that they reduce pregnancy rates among young people.

Six members of the committee resigned in June 2017, citing as the reason that the president, "has no strategy to address the ongoing HIV/AIDS epidemic, seeks zero input from experts to formulate HIV policy, and—most concerning—pushes legislation that will harm people living with HIV and halt or reverse important gains made in the fight against this disease". In December 2017 Trump dismissed all the remaining 16 members. Gabriel Maldonado, a former member of PACHA, said in a Washington Post article "Like any administration, they want their own people there," identifying "ideological and philosophical differences" and that many of the remaining members, including her, were appointed by former president Barack Obama. "I was co-chair of the disparities committee," Maldonado added, "so much of my advocacy and policy references surrounded vulnerable populations, addressing issuing of diverse communities, specifically looking at the impacts of the LGBT community, namely, the disproportionate impact of HIV and AIDS to people of color, gay men, transgender women...and a lot of those key vulnerable populations are not being prioritized in this administration." Newsweek stated that there were fears that "the charter for PACHA will be re-written with renewed focus on abstinence and religious, non-evidence based public health approaches."

== See also ==
- National Commission on AIDS
- Office of National AIDS Policy
- President's Commission on the HIV Epidemic
- President's Emergency Plan for AIDS Relief
