= Rashida Jolley =

American harpist

Rashida Jolley is an American harpist who uses her traditionally classical music instrument in hip-hop, R&B, and pop music. Jolley also writes her own songs, fusing many different genres together.

== Early life and education ==
Jolley grew up in Washington, D.C. during which she attended Christian schools and was homeschooled for her last few years of high school. Her father, Noble Jolley Sr., was a jazz guitarist who taught all of his seven children how to play and perform. Jolley says that her mother first chose the harp for her, but she says that it "was love at first sight." Rashida Jolley began singing in her church choir when she was seven and was playing the harp at the DC Youth Orchestra Program (DCYOP) when she was ten. She is a graduate of Nyack College with a bachelor's degree in history.

== Career ==
In 1997, when she participated in her first Miss D.C. pageant, she was nicknamed "Baby Diva." Jolley represented Washington, D.C. in the Miss America Pageant in 2000. In 2004, she was on the Presidential Advisory Council on HIV/AIDS and a speaker with the Project Reality abstinence education group. She also released her first CD, "Love is Not a Game" in 2004.

Jolley competed on America's Got Talent in 2009. Jolley played harp for Lady Gaga on her 2010-2011 Monster Ball World Tour. The Washington Post called Jolley a "head-banging harpist." Jolley released her second album in 2011, titled "There's No One Else Like You." She partnered with the Boys and Girls Club of DC in an anti-bullying program in 2013.

Jolley has also performed on the BET Rap It Up Tour and at the Ludacris Foundation's Tribute to Quincy Jones.
