= Harlan Pruden =

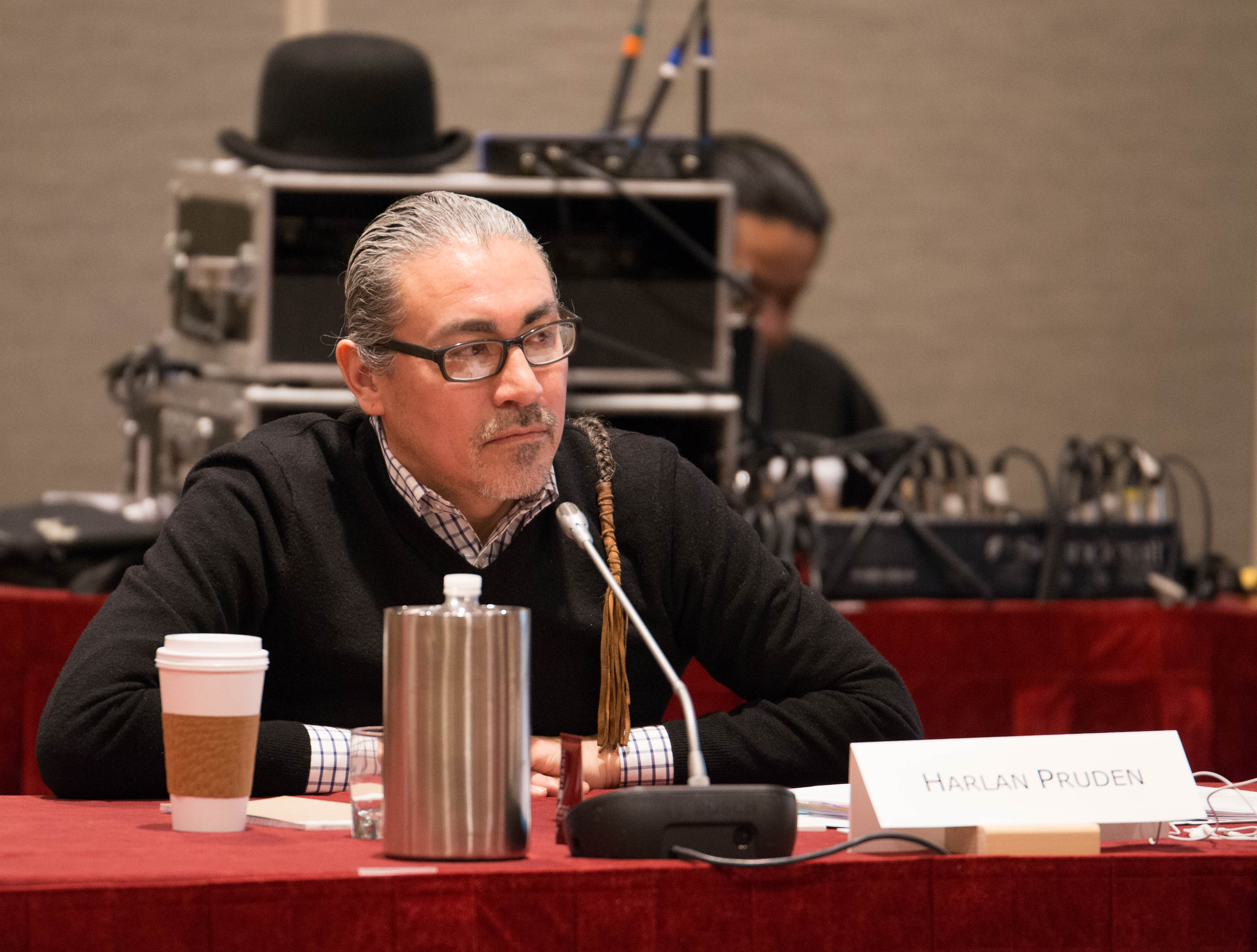
Harlan Pruden at the February 2015 PACHA

Harlan Pruden is a First Nations Cree scholar and community organizer known for his work in the two-spirit community.

== Background ==
Pruden was raised in northeast Alberta, Canada and is a member of the Cree Nation. He grew up on his mother's reservation, the Beaver Lake Cree Nation, but is a member of the Saddle Lake Cree Nation in Alberta. PRUDEN moved to New York City in May 1994. In addition to serving on the board of for the American Indian Community House's board, he co-founded the NorthEast Two-Spirit Society (NE2SS) in New York City, which organizes traditional cultural ceremonies for two-spirit Indigenous peoples. He was also a co-chair of the National Native HIV/AIDS Coalition, one of the first national efforts within the HIV/AIDS field to include all of the Two-Spirit organizations and groups in the United States.

In 2011, Pruden assisted the Chicago-Based Legacy Project, whose outdoor LGBT history installation, The Legacy Walk, included a plaque co-written by Pruden. In April 2011, Pruden was appointed to Manhattan Community Board 12, where he served as the Chair of Parks and Cultural Affairs.

In the spring of 2013, he was appointed to be an American representative to the International Indigenous Peoples Working Group on HIV/AIDS.

In August 2014, he was appointed to the Presidential Advisory Council on HIV/AIDS. Pruden is the co-chair of the global subcommittee and a member for the health disparity subcommittee. He is one of the lead organizers of the National Confederacy of Two-Spirit Organizations; serves as the principal two-spirit consultant to USA's federal agency of Substance Abuse Mental Services Administration (SAMHSA) Tribal Training and Technical Assistance Center. He serves as an honorary committee member of the Institute for Sexual Minority Studies and Services at the University of Alberta, and is a native community advisory expert panel member for the University of Washington’s Indigenous Wellness Research Institute.

Pruden has also headed SpeakOUT: LGBT Voices for Recovery, a program of the LGBT Community Center in New York City. Pruden has worked on political campaigns, including Hillary Clinton’s 2000 Senate race; as well as New York State Senate and New York City Council races. He was formerly Chief of Staff for Craig M. Johnson, a former State Legislator, when Johnson was in the Nassau County Legislature.

Up until March 2014, Pruden worked for the State of New York's Empire State Development Corporation in the Division of Minority & Women's Business Development, which promotes equality of economic opportunities for MWBEs works towards the elimination of barriers to their participation in state contracts. This is supported by CIHR's page, in which this identifies him as an educator at the BC Centre for Disease Control's Chee Mamuk Program, and it says that the Two-Spirit Dry Lab focuses almost exclusively on Two-Spirit people, communities, and their experiences.

== Personal life ==
As of April 2015, he now lives in Vancouver, British Columbia with his spouse Stephen.
