= Amy Pruden =

American civil and environmental engineer

Amy Pruden (also known as Amy J. Pruden-Bagchi) is an American civil and environmental engineer whose research concerns the microbiomes of the built environment, including the study of antimicrobial resistance as a type of pollution, spread through the water system, and the effects of resistant microbiota on other kinds of water pollution. She works at Virginia Tech as W. Thomas Rice Professor and University Distinguished Professor in the Charles E. Via, Jr. Department of Civil & Environmental Engineering.

== Education and career ==
Pruden's interest in water began through growing up by a lake. She majored in biology at the University of Cincinnati, graduating in 1997. She completed a Ph.D. in environmental science at the University of Cincinnati in 2002.

She joined Colorado State University as an assistant professor in the Department of Civil and Environmental Engineering in 2002, and was promoted to associate professor in 2008. In the same year, she moved to Virginia Tech, where she became a full professor in 2013, W. Thomas Rice Professor of Engineering in 2016, and University Distinguished Professor in 2021.

== Recognition ==
Pruden was a 2006 recipient of the Presidential Early Career Award for Scientists and Engineers, "for her outstanding research using molecular biology to investigate the pathways, mitigation, and treatment of antibiotic resistance genes (ARGs) in water, and for her educational activities involving high school, undergraduate, and graduate students, especially minority students".

She was the 2014 recipient of the Paul L. Busch Award of the Water Research Foundation, and the 2023 recipient of the foundation's Research Innovation Award. In 2024 she received the ISME/IWA BioCluster Grand Prize of the International Society for Microbial Ecology and International Water Association, "in recognition of interdisciplinary research of outstanding merit at the interface of microbial ecology and water/wastewater treatment".

She was named as a Fellow of the International Water Association in 2020, and elected to the Virginia Academy of Science, Engineering, and Medicine in 2024.
