= 2004 Democratic National Convention =

U.S. political event held in Boston, Massachusetts

- 2004 presidential election

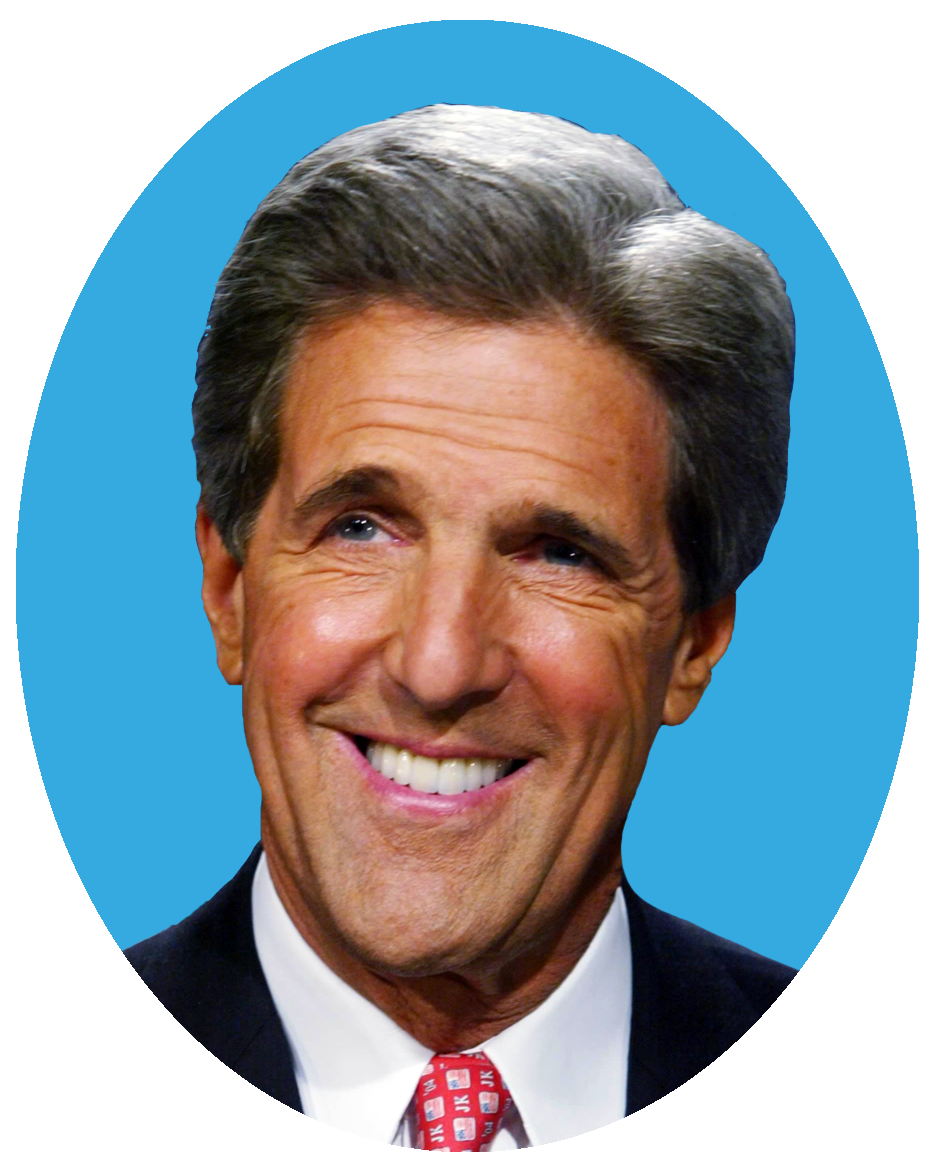
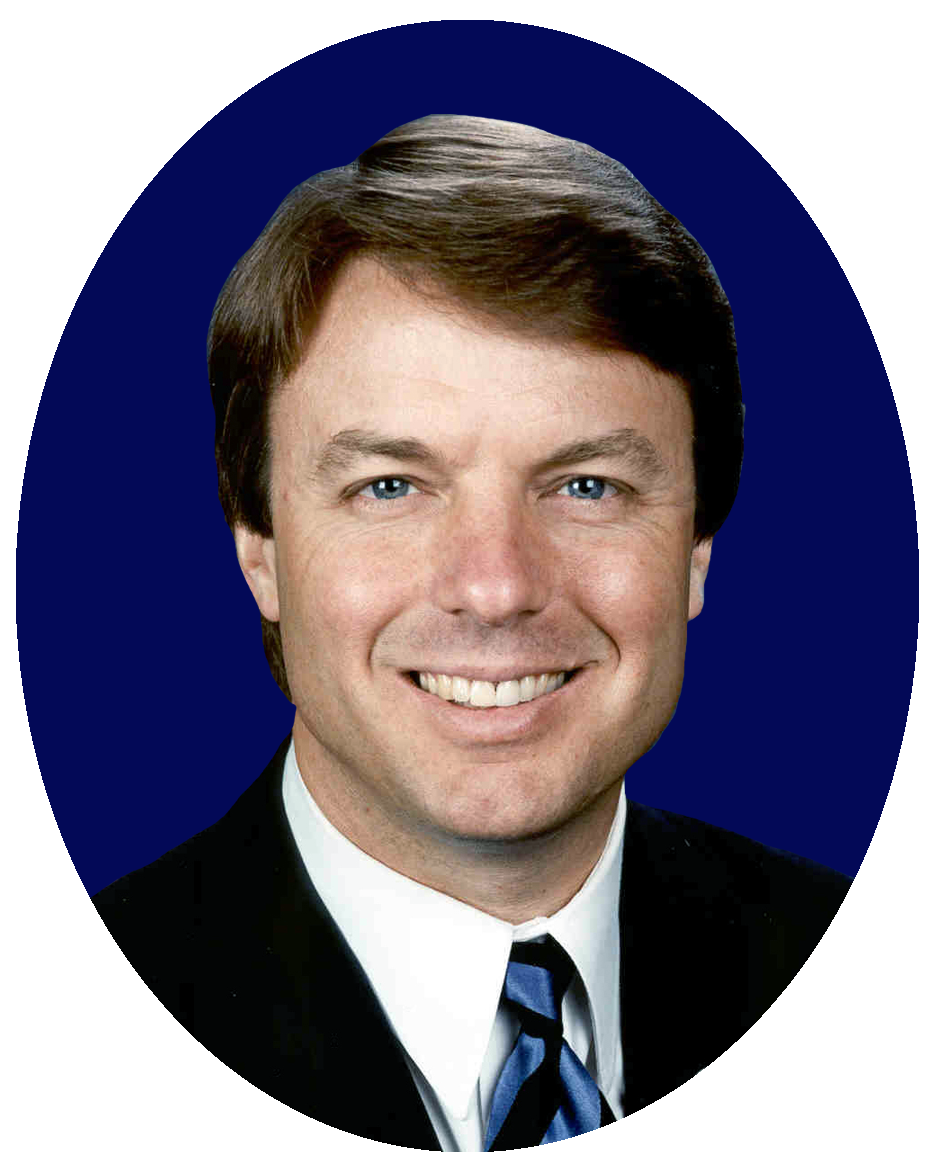
- Nominees; Kerry and Edwards

Convention
- Dates: July 26–29, 2004
- City: Boston, Massachusetts
- Venue: FleetCenter
- Chair: Bill Richardson of New Mexico
- Keynote speaker: Barack Obama of Illinois

Candidates
- Presidential nominee: John Kerry of Massachusetts
- Vice-presidential nominee: John Edwards of North Carolina

Voting
- Total delegates: 4,322
- Votes needed for nomination: 2,164
- Results (president): Kerry (MA): 4,253 (98.40%); Kucinich (OH): 43 (0.99%); Abstention: 26 (0.60%)
- Results (vice president): Edwards (NC): Acclamation
- Ballots: 1

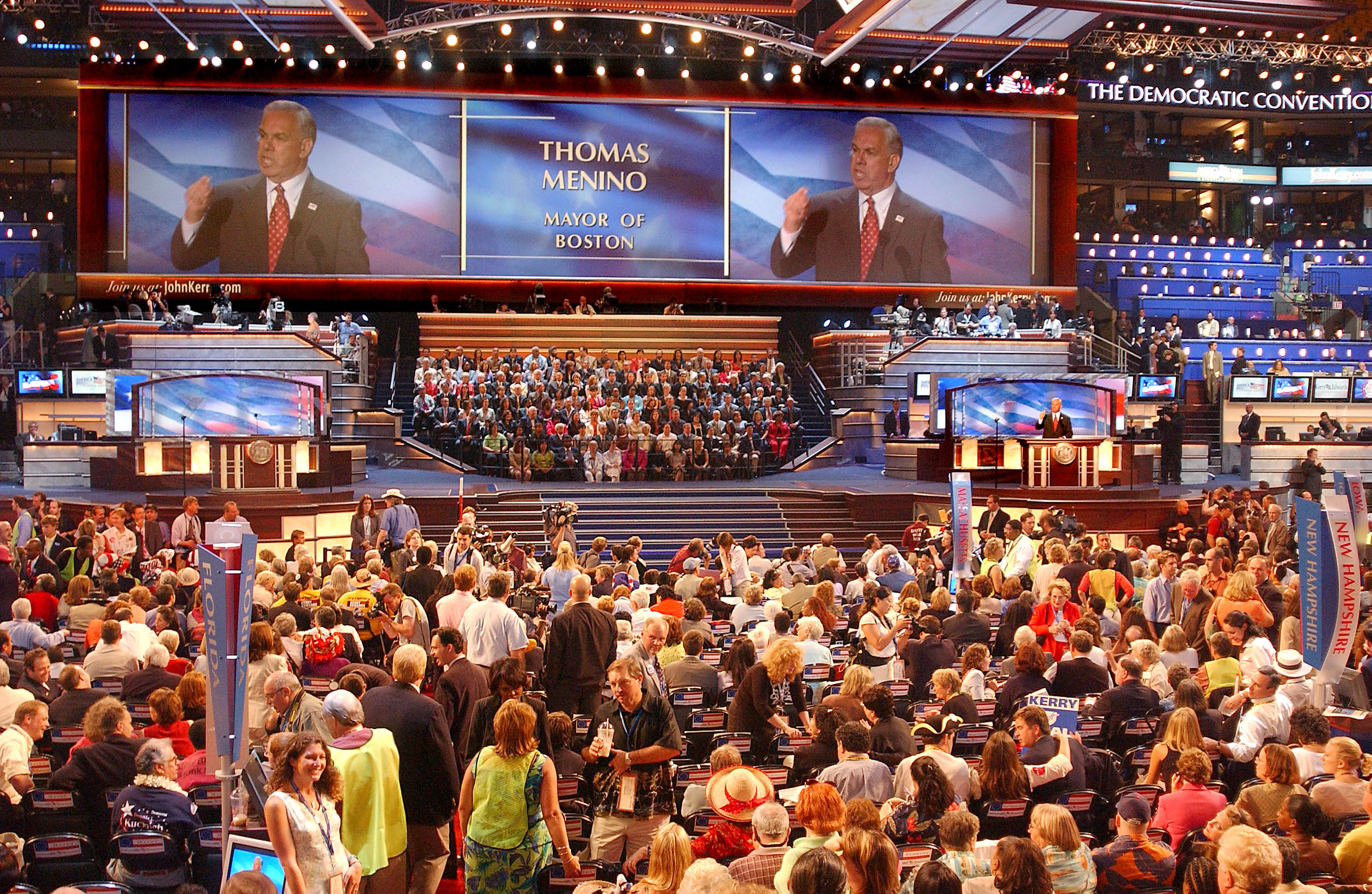
Boston mayor Thomas Menino welcomes delegates to the convention

The 2004 Democratic National Convention convened from July 26 to 29, 2004 at the FleetCenter (now the TD Garden) in Boston, Massachusetts, and nominated Senator John Kerry from Massachusetts for president and Senator John Edwards from North Carolina for vice president, respectively, in the 2004 presidential election.

The 2004 Democratic National Convention was famous for the keynote speech of Barack Obama, who would go on to be elected President four years later. New Mexico Governor Bill Richardson served as chairman of the convention, while former presidential advisor to Bill Clinton, Lottie Shackelford, served as vice chairwoman of the convention.

The 2004 Democratic National Convention marked the formal end of the active primary election season, although all meaningful primary elections had finished months earlier. After the convention, John Kerry and John Edwards wer``e defeated by the incumbent George W. Bush and Dick Cheney in the general election.

== Convention themes ==
The 2004 Democratic National Convention featured a theme for each day of the convention. The first night of the meeting focused on the theme "Plan for America's Future" with speeches devoted to building optimism for John Kerry's candidacy. The second night of the meeting focused on the theme "A Lifetime of Strength and Service" devoted to John Kerry's biography and his path to his nomination. The third night of the meeting focused on the theme "A Stronger More Secure America" devoted to issues of homeland security and the global war on terror. The last night of the meeting focused on the theme "Stronger at Home, Respected in the World" devoted to the overall agenda of the party to secure the borders, improving domestic welfare while at the same time promoting international cooperation in world affairs. The phrase "Help is on the Way" was often repeated by speakers such as John Edwards.

This was the first major party presidential nominating convention to be held since the terrorist attacks of September 11 attacks. During the convention, there was a memorial service to honor the victims of the attacks. Haleema Salie, who lost her daughter, son-in-law, and unborn grandchild on American Flight 11, spoke.

== Party platform ==
The 2004 Democratic National Convention successfully passed an official party platform. A forty-three page document, the party platform was entitled "Strong at Home, Respected in the World" – also the name of the theme conveyed on the last night of the convention. The first part of the platform was called "A Strong, Respected America". The section defined specific goals and actions to defeat terrorism, to keep weapons of mass destruction from the hands of terrorists, to promote world peace and security, to strengthen the military, to achieve energy independence and to strengthen homeland security. The second part of the platform was called, "A Strong, Growing Economy". The section defined specific goals and actions to create what the party called "good jobs" and "standing up for the great American middle class." The third part of the platform was called, "Strong, Healthy Families." The section defined specific goals and actions to reform the healthcare system in the United States, to improve education and to protect the environment. The final part of the platform was called, "A Strong American Community." It stressed the diversity of the nation and the importance of upholding civil rights as a major tenet of the party.

== Site selection ==
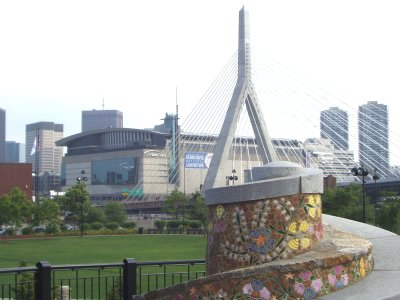
The FleetCenter during the 2004 Democratic National Convention

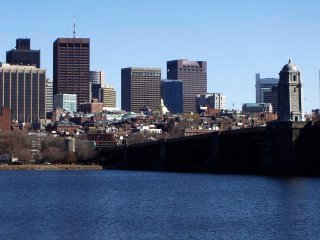
Beacon Hill and Downtown Boston as seen from Cambridge

Bidding cities
City	Status of bid	Venue	Financial package pledged by city	Previous major party conventions hosted by city
Boston, Massachusetts	Winner	FleetCenter	$49.5 million	—N/a
Detroit, Michigan	Finalist	Ford Field, Joe Louis Arena, Cobo Hall	$50 million	Republican: 1980
Miami, Florida	Finalist	American Airlines Arena, Coconut Grove Convention Center, and Miami Beach Convention Center	$40 million	Democratic: 1972; Republican: 1968, 1972
New York City, New York	Finalist	Madison Square Garden	$72 million	Democratic: 1868, 1924, 1976, 1980, 1992
Baltimore, Maryland	Non-finalist	Potentially Oriole Park at Camden Yards		Democratic: 1832, 1835, 1840, 1844, 1848, 1852, 1860, 1872, 1912; Republican: 1864; Whig: 1844, 1852, 1856

After an initial notice to 34 cities, 10 cities requested the RFP to host the convention: Atlanta, Baltimore, Boston, Chicago, Dallas, Detroit, Houston, Miami, New York City and Pittsburgh. Of those, Baltimore, Boston, Detroit, Miami and New York City submitted bids. Baltimore's bid was considered a long-shot. The city lacked a conventional venue with enough space to accommodate the convention, and was proposing the prospect of erecting a temporary canopy at Oriole Park at Camden Yards (which would have likely necessitated the baseball team tenant to vacate the venue for a roughly two-month period of their season). Baltimore was eliminated. Boston, Detroit, Miami and New York City were selected as the finalist cities. Each of the finalist cities received visits from members of the Democratic National Committee during the site selection process. Boston was announced as the host of the convention on November 13, 2002.

The 2004 Democratic National Convention was the first major party presidential nominating convention to held in Boston. With John Kerry arising as the winner of the primaries, it ultimately was one of the few presidential nominating conventions that was held in the home state of the party's nominee.

As a result of the selection of Boston, organizers of the Reebok Pro Summer League developmental basketball program had to fold the league into the upstart Las Vegas Summer League due to a lack of lodging in the Boston area.

Until Chicago, Illinois, was selected as the host of the 2024 Democratic National Convention, 2004 was the last time that either major party chose to hold their convention in a state that was not considered to be a swing state (the Republicans held their 2004 convention in New York City).

== Logistics ==
=== Security ===
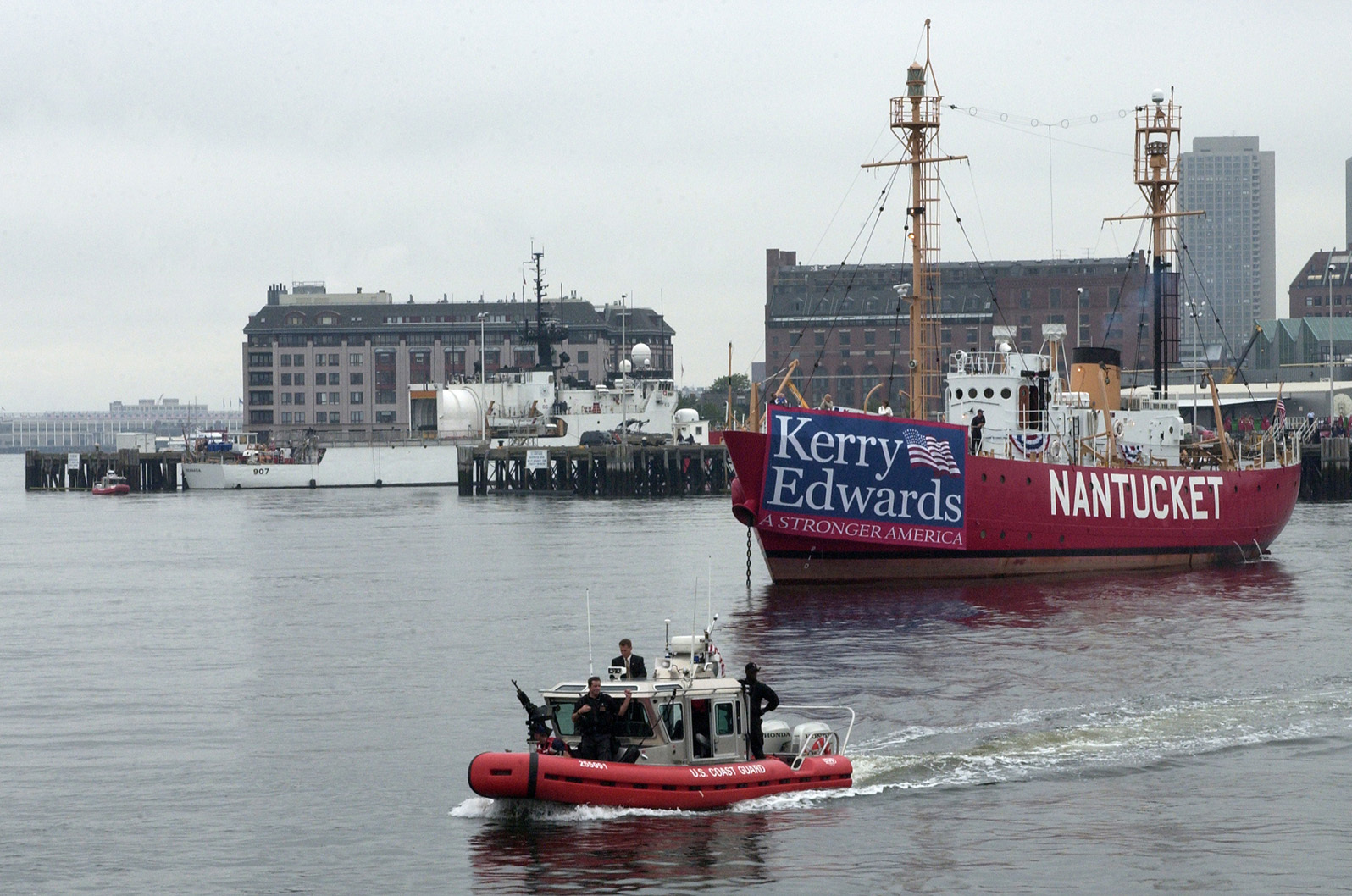
The U.S. Coast Guard vessel escorting a ferry boat upon which nominee John Kerry was being transported to a rally

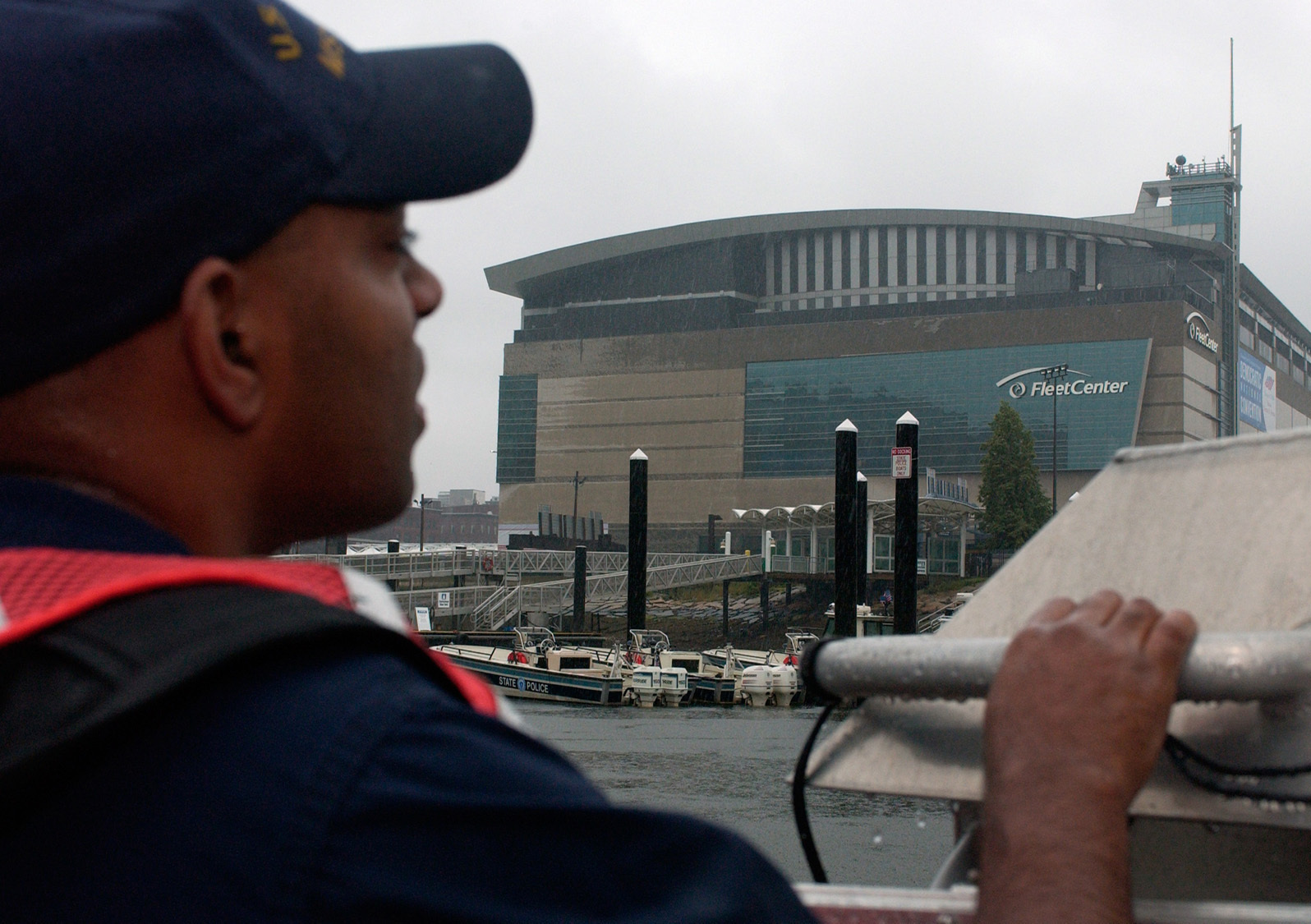
A U.S. Coast Guardsman patrols the waters adjacent to the FleetCenter

During the convention, U.S. Capitol Police, the U.S. Coast Guard, and other governmental organizations took many security measures to protect the participants of the Democratic National Convention. Security measures included bomb-sniffing dogs, 7-feet high metal barricades, a ban on corporate and private flights at Logan International Airport, along with the temporary closure of Interstate 93.

=== Police union ===
Other Bostonians took advantage of the meeting as a national stage for specific agendas. The police union, for example, gained attention with threats of picketing of delegates from entering and exiting functions – a dilemma for Democrats as the party has traditionally been an ally of organized labor. Having worked without a contract for two years, the Boston Police Patrolmen's Association struck a deal with Boston mayor Thomas Menino for a new contract, avoiding a major embarrassment for the party.

== Barack Obama's keynote address ==
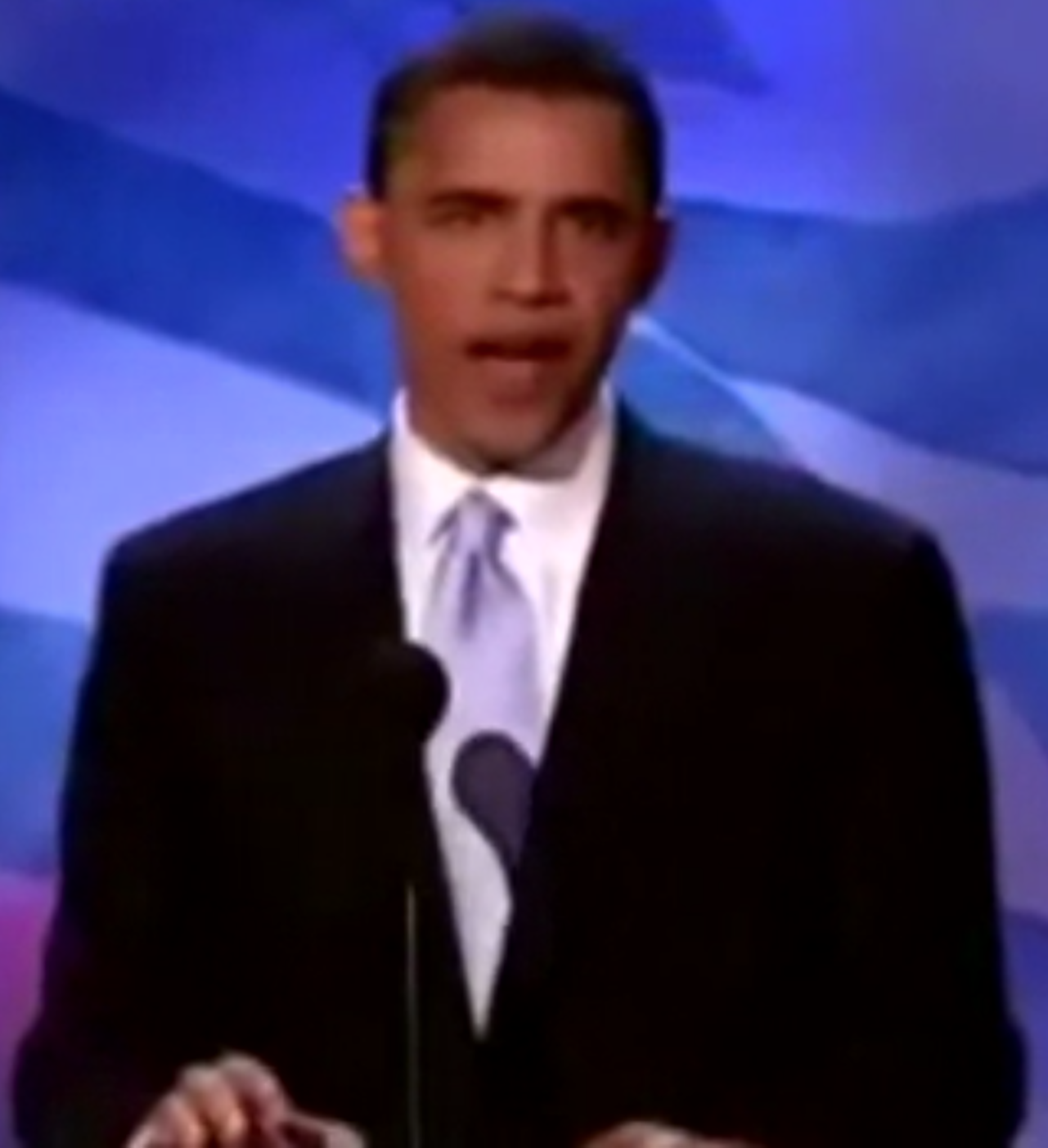
Barack Obama delivering the keynote address

State Senator Barack Obama, the Illinois Democratic candidate for United States Senate, delivered the convention's keynote address on Tuesday, July 27, 2004. His unexpected landslide victory in the March 2004 Illinois U.S. Senate Democratic primary had made him overnight a rising star within the national Democratic Party, started speculation about a presidential future, and led to the reissue of his memoir, Dreams from My Father. His keynote address, although not carried by the commercial broadcast television networks, was well received, which further elevated his status within the Democratic Party and led to his reissued memoir becoming a bestseller. As the keynote speaker, Obama set the tone for the party platform. His speech, proclaiming the unnecessary and artificial divides in American culture and politics, was reminiscent of John Edwards's "Two Americas" stump speech: "There's not a liberal America and a conservative America—there's the United States of America." Obama emphasized the importance of unity, and made veiled jabs at the Bush administration and the news media's perceived oversimplification and diversionary use of wedge issues: "We worship an awesome God in the blue states, and we don't like federal agents poking around in our libraries in the red states. We coach Little League in the blue states, and yes, we've got some gay friends in the red states. There are patriots who opposed the war in Iraq, and there are patriots who supported the war in Iraq. We are one people, all of us pledging allegiance to the Stars and Stripes, all of us defending the United States of America."

Obama noted his interracial and international heritage: he was born in Honolulu, Hawaii to a Kenyan immigrant father and a white mother from Kansas. He emphasized the power of education, recounting the privilege of attending the exclusive Punahou School and Harvard Law School despite his family's poverty, and criticized the perception that poor black youths who read books are "acting white." He went on to describe his successful career in law and politics while raising a family in Chicago. "In no other country on Earth is my story even possible", Obama proclaimed. Towards the end of his speech, he emphasized the importance of hope in the American saga, and he illustrated how that hope manifested itself in the lives of John Kerry, John Edwards, and even his own personal life, as "a skinny kid with a funny name who believes that America has a place for him too." According to Obama, the "audacity of hope" is "God's greatest gift" to Americans, allowing him to feel optimistic that the lives of average Americans can be improved with the right governmental policies. Following the speech political commentator Chris Matthews rightly predicted "I just saw the first black president".

== Edwards' address ==
Not yet formally nominated for the vice presidency, John Edwards took the stage at the convention to give the first major national speech of his political career. Delegates raised red-and-white vertical "Edwards" banners and chanted his name. The theme of Edwards's address was the divide between the "two Americas", his populist message throughout the primary campaign and now one embraced by Kerry. He tied the division to his own roots in North Carolina, and introduced his family to the audience. Edwards addressed his parents from the podium: "You taught me the values that I carry in my heart: faith, family, responsibility, opportunity for everyone. You taught me that there's dignity and honor in a hard day's work. You taught me to always look out for our neighbors, to never look down on anybody, and treat everybody with respect." Edwards went on to define the two Americas he claimed to exist, one for the rich and one for the poor, and repeated several times that "It doesn't have to be that way." He called for one health care system, equal in quality to the coverage received by senators and other elected officials, and promised to establish a Patients' Bill of Rights. Edwards proposed one public school system for all, arguing that "None of us believe that the quality of a child's education should be controlled by where they live or the affluence of their community." He appealed for the end of the two economies, "one for people who are set for life, they know their kids and grand-kids are going to be just fine, and then one for most Americans, people who live paycheck to paycheck." Edwards also stated how the Democrats expected to pay for their agenda: "We're going to roll back – we're going to roll back the tax cuts for the wealthiest Americans. And we're going to close corporate loopholes. We're going to cut government contractors and wasteful spending. We can move this country forward without passing the burden to our children and our grandchildren."

Many pundits noted that while Edwards's charismatic style was in evidence, he had rushed through the speech, ending several minutes earlier than planned. The delegates in the FleetCenter, however, were enraptured, and Edwards led them several times in a statement-response chant: "Hope is on the way." This, and the general upbeat tone of the address, was a response to attacks by the Bush campaign claiming that Kerry and Edwards were pessimistic and cynical; it was altered and echoed the next day in the more detailed speech of John Kerry: "Help is on the way."

== Results of delegate voting ==
In the days before the convention started, the other candidates withdrew, freed their delegates and officially endorsed Kerry. All the delegates voted to ratify this decision and vote for Kerry, except those of Kucinich, who attempted to vote for Kucinich anyway. Many states refused to let them do so, and only permitted them to register abstentions. The final tally went thus:

=== President ===
Democratic National Convention presidential vote, 2004
Candidate	Votes	Percentage
John Kerry	4,253	98.40%
Dennis Kucinich	43	0.99%
Abstentions	26	0.60%
Totals	4,322	100.00%

=== Vice president ===
- John Edwards was chosen by acclamation.

== Kerry's address ==
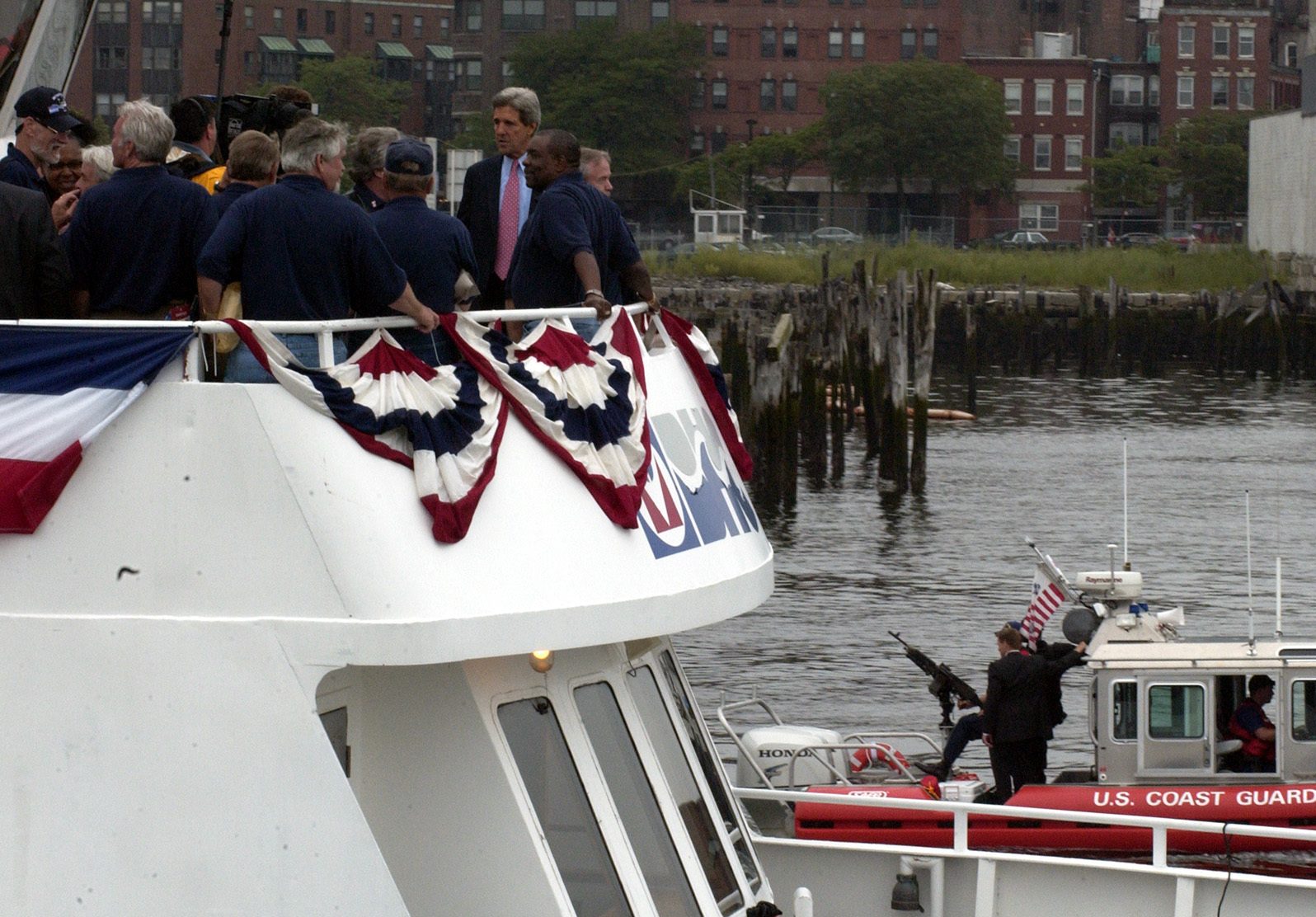
Kerry and others aboard a boat in Boston Harbor during the convention

Prior to his speech, John Kerry's daughter spoke about her father. After this, a video played, showing highlights from Kerry's life, including his birth in Colorado, his childhood in New England, the travels with his diplomat father to post-World War II Germany, and his service in Vietnam's Mekong Delta, interspersed with clips of Kerry speaking and narrated voice overs. After the video's conclusion, former U.S. Senator Max Cleland delivered a speech proclaiming that the global conflict and active wars in Afghanistan and Iraq required a decorated military hero such as Kerry in the White House. This concluded with Kerry's entrance, where he made a military salute and announced, "I'm John Kerry, and I'm reporting for duty!" Kerry then accepted the nomination for president.

Democrats reacted positively to John Kerry's acceptance speech. With Democrats strongly opposed to the Bush administration, John Kerry spent most of his speech appealing to independent voters and to swing voters. He promised to train 40,000 new active duty troops, to implement all the recommendations of the 9/11 Commission, to cut the national deficit in half within four years, to cut middle class taxes while repealing the Bush administration's tax cuts for those making more than US$200,000 per year, to stop privatization of Social Security, and to expand stem cell research.

On the day after Kerry's speech, George W. Bush's reelection campaign launched a counterattack on the claims and promises made by Kerry and others at the convention. At a campaign stop in Springfield, Missouri, Bush told a crowd: "My opponent has good intentions, but intentions do not always translate to results", attacking Senator Kerry's record in the Senate.

== Other speakers ==
In addition to the Obama, Edwards, and Kerry addresses, there were also speeches from former presidents Bill Clinton and Jimmy Carter, former vice-president and 2000 presidential nominee Al Gore, New York Senator and former First Lady Hillary Clinton, Massachusetts senator Ted Kennedy, former candidate Al Sharpton, and presidential advisory counsel on HIV/AIDS Denise Stokes. Ron Reagan, son of Republican president Ronald Reagan, also spoke at the convention, blaming Bush's hijacking of his father's legacy for his switch in support to the Democrats.

== Lack of convention 'bounce' ==
Polls conducted after Kerry's speech showed no significant increase of support (or "convention bounce") for the Democratic nominee's bid to unseat President Bush. Democrats ascribed the disappointing numbers to an unusually polarized electorate that year with few undecided voters, though Bush did get a small bounce out of his convention.

== Demonstrations and protests ==
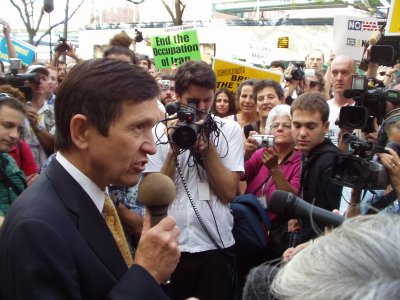
Presidential candidate Dennis Kucinich speaks out against the Iraq War.

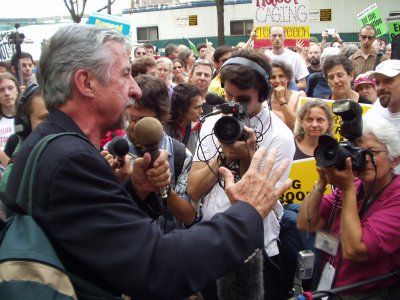
Tom Hayden urges anti-war activists to continue efforts to organize.

There were a number of demonstrations during the 2004 Democratic National Convention. Protesters included members of the Bl(A)ck Tea Society, a group of self-described anarchists, who opposed the war in Iraq. Approximately 400 members of the Bl(A)ck Tea Society marched through Boston's financial district and headed toward the FleetCenter, where they set fire to an effigy that showed George Bush on one side and John Kerry on the other.

That evening a group of peace activists held a peaceful rally a few hundred feet from the FleetCenter. Local Boston politicians were joined by presidential candidate Dennis Kucinich and long-time activist and California state senator Tom Hayden in a call to end the occupation of and to remove U.S. troops from Iraq and to bring in an international peacekeeping force. Also, Hayden and Kucinich called on anti-war Democrats to support John Kerry against George Bush in the general election.

The largest protest was held on the Sunday evening before the convention was set to start. An estimated 2,000 anti-war members marched at the same time as approximately 1,000 anti-abortion activists, and the two groups crossed paths en route to the convention center. The following day, this anti-abortion group had its permit revoked to protest outside of the Kerry family home. They challenged the decision, but it was upheld by a federal judge, who sided with the Secret Service in determining that the protest would be too close to Kerry's home, potentially endangering the presidential candidate.

== See also ==
- 2004 Green National Convention
- 2004 Libertarian National Convention
- 2004 Republican National Convention
- 2004 Democratic Party presidential primaries
- 2004 United States presidential election
- John Kerry 2004 presidential campaign
- List of Democratic National Conventions
- United States presidential nominating convention
- History of the United States Democratic Party

Preceded by 2000; Los Angeles	Democratic National Conventions	Succeeded by 2008; Denver
