= 2004 North Dakota Republican presidential caucuses =

- February 3, 2004

26 delegate to the 2004 Republican National Convention
Candidate	George W. Bush
Home state	Texas
Delegate count	26
Popular vote	2,002
Percentage	99.1%

The 2004 North Dakota Republican presidential caucuses were held on February 3, 2004, as part of the 2004 United States Republican Party primaries for the 2004 U.S. presidential election. 26 delegates to the 2004 Republican National Convention were allocated to the presidential candidates, the contest was held alongside primaries in Missouri and Oklahoma.

Incumbent President George W. Bush won the contest by big results of 99.1% popular votes and 26 total delegates, this would probably be the biggest record of a 2004 primary election until Wisconsin.

== Candidates ==
The following candidates:

- Incumbent President George W. Bush
- Jack Fellure
- Ed Schafer (not running for President)

== Results ==
President George W. Bush won the contest by 26 delegates to the 2004 Republican National Convention and 2,002 popular votes from the state of North Dakota, 99.1% of the popular votes made this 2004 Republican contest as the second big result until Wisconsin came. There were no major obstacles in the contest, Jack Fellure, the second candidate for the caucuses only received 14 votes (0.7%) and Ed Schafer only received 4 popular votes (0.2%) although he didn't even run for President.

North Dakota Republican caucus, February 3, 2004
Candidate	Votes	Percentage	Actual delegate count		
Candidate	Votes	Percentage	Bound	Unbound	Total
George W. Bush	2,002	99,1%	26		26
Jack Fellure	14	0.7%			
Ed Schafer (Not running for President)	4	0.2%			
Total:	2,020	100.00%	26		26

== See also ==
- 2004 Republican Party presidential primaries
- 2004 North Dakota Democratic presidential caucuses
- 2004 Republican National Convention
- 2004 United States presidential election
- 2004 United States presidential election in North Dakota
- 2016 Republican Party presidential primaries
