= Earl Dodge =

American politician (1932–2007)

Personal details
- Born: Earl Farwell Dodge Jr. December 24, 1932 Malden, Massachusetts, U.S.
- Died: November 7, 2007 (aged 74) Aurora, Colorado, U.S.
- Party: Prohibition
- Other political affiliations: Republican (before 1952)
- Spouse: Barbara Viola Regan
- Children: 7

Earl Farwell Dodge Jr. (December 24, 1932 – November 7, 2007) was an American politician who served as the Prohibition Party's chairman and presidential candidate from the 1984 to 2000 presidential elections and later ran with the nomination of his own faction during the 2004 presidential election.

== Early life ==
Earl Farwell Dodge Jr. was born on December 24, 1932, to Earl Farwell and Dorothy May Harris in Malden, Massachusetts. He attended school until the tenth grade and on July 20, 1951, he married Barbara Regan. In 1952, he joined the Prohibition Party after attending a rally hosted by future Prohibition vice-presidential nominee Mark R. Shaw.

== Career ==
=== Politics ===
From 1953 to 1956, he served as the executive secretary of the Massachusetts Prohibition Party and ran for Massachusetts Secretary of State in 1956. In 1956, he moved to Indiana and from 1958 to 1961, he served as the chairman of the Indiana Prohibition Party and ran for Indiana's second congressional district in 1960. From 1961 to 1962, he lived in Denver, Colorado. From 1962 to 1966, he worked for the National Christian Citizens Committee and ran for the United States Senate.

Dodge served as temporary chairman for the 1959 Prohibition National Convention. At the time, he was residing in Winona Lake, Indiana, where the convention was being held.

From 1958 to 1962, Dodge served as the co-chairman of the Prohibition Party under E. Harold Munn. In 1967, he was appointed to the Kalamazoo Community Relations Board and served until 1970. In 1974, he was appointed to the Colorado State Elections Advisory Board. In 1979, he was selected to serve as the chairman of the National Statesman Party, which the Prohibition Party had changed its name to in 1977, and served until 2003.

Dodge also ran for the governorship of Colorado with the Prohibition nomination in every election from 1974 to 1994 except for in 1990. In 1990, he ran in Colorado's Senate election while his daughter, Karen J. Thiessen, ran for state Treasurer, his son, Calvin G. Dodge, ran for Secretary of State, and Calvin's wife, Elsi, ran for the regent of Colorado University.

=== Presidential ===
During the 1976 and 1980 presidential elections he was given the vice-presidential nomination of the Prohibition Party.

On June 24, 1983, forty five delegates voted to give Dodge the presidential nomination in Mandan, North Dakota, for the 1984 presidential election and on January 3, 1984, he suffered a heart attack, but recovered. He appeared on the ballots in North Dakota, New Mexico, Kansas, Arkansas, and Colorado and as a write-in candidate in Ohio and received 4,236 votes.

During the 1988 presidential election he was given the party's presidential nomination again and appeared on the ballot in Arkansas, Tennessee, New Mexico, and Colorado and received 8,002 votes. During the 1992 presidential election he appeared on the ballot in Arkansas, Tennessee, and New Mexico and only received 961 votes. During the 1996 presidential election he appeared on the ballot in Colorado, Arkansas, Tennessee, and Utah and received 1,298 votes.

From June 28 to 30, 1999, around thirty delegates attended the national convention in Bird-in-Hand, Pennsylvania, and nine voted to give Dodge the presidential nomination against eight voting for Gary R. Van Horn and the vice-presidential nomination to W. Dean Watkins. He attempted to win the Independent American Party presidential nomination to receive ballot access in Utah, but was defeated by U.S. Taxpayers' Party presidential nominee Howard Phillips and in the general election he only appeared on the ballot in Colorado and received 208 votes.

=== 2004 and 2008 presidential campaigns ===
During his tenure as chairman of the party Dodge was criticized by members for his financial actions. He avoided paying the Social Security tax on money earned through his involvement in the Prohibition Party by laundering it through the National Prohibition Foundation. During Earl Higgerson's ten years as treasurer Dodge refused to allow him to see the party's account books, donor lists, sign checks, or know of actions taken by Dodge on his account. In 1999, he sold the party's headquarters for $119,500 saying that he would use the money to build one on his property, but was alleged to have kept the money for himself and moved the party's headquarters to a tool shed.

In 2003, members of the party opposed to him met at a condo in Tennessee and promoted him to chairman emeritus, as a polite way of firing him according to James Hedges. During the 2004 presidential election their faction nominated Gene Amondson under the Concerns of People ballot line while eight delegates (Note: According to Dodge, 25 delegates were present.) from his faction of the party gave him its presidential nomination at his home in Lakewood, Colorado. In the general election he appeared on the ballot in Colorado and received 140 votes while Amondson received 1,944 votes from Colorado and Louisiana.

On June 12, 2007, members of his faction from three states met in a church in Arvada, Colorado, where they nominated him for president and Howard Lydick, who received the vice-presidential nomination in 2004, for vice-president. On November 7, Dodge was waiting to board a flight en route from Denver International Airport to Pennsylvania, when he suddenly collapsed due to cardiac arrhythmia and was taken to the University of Colorado Hospital where he died. Following Dodge's death Howard Lydick worked to unite the two factions of the Prohibition Party behind Gene Amondson before Lydick's own death on August 5, 2008.

== Electoral history ==
Earl Dodge electoral history

1956 Massachusetts Secretary of State election
Party	Candidate	Votes	%	±%
Democratic	Edward J. Cronin (incumbent)	1,196,746	53.40%	+2.22%
Republican	Richard I. Furbush	1,025,295	45.75%	−2.43%
Prohibition	Earl Dodge	10,030	0.45%	−0.03%
Socialist Labor	Lawrence Gilfedder	9,181	0.41%	−0.17%
Write-in		5	0.00%	+0.00%
Total votes		2,241,257	100.00%	

1960 Indiana Second Congressional district election
Party	Candidate	Votes	%	±%
Republican	Charles A. Halleck (incumbent)	95,920	57.46%	+5.23%
Democratic	George H. Bowers	70,464	42.21%	−5.56%
Prohibition	Earl Dodge	553	0.33%	+0.33%
Total votes		166,937	100.00%	

1966 Kansas United States Senate election
Party	Candidate	Votes	%	±%
Republican	James B. Pearson (incumbent)	350,077	52.15%	−4.06%
Democratic	James Floyd Breeding	303,223	45.17%	+2.65%
Prohibition	Earl Dodge	9,364	1.40%	+0.13%
Conservative	George W. Snell	7,103	1.06%	+1.06%
Independent	Robert Ellsworth (write-in)	896	0.13%	+0.13%
Independent	Arthur Peine (write-in)	682	0.10%	+0.10%
Total votes		671,345	100.00%	

1974 Colorado gubernatorial election
Party	Candidate	Votes	%	±%
Democratic	Richard Lamm	441,199	53.22%	+7.98%
Republican	John D. Vanderhoof (incumbent)	378,907	45.71%	−6.75%
Prohibition	Earl Dodge	6,419	0.77%	+0.77%
U.S. Labor	Lann Meyers	2,307	0.28%	+0.28%
Independent	Luke Zell (write-in)	136	0.02%	+0.02%
Total votes		828,968	100.00%	

1978 Colorado gubernatorial election
Party	Candidate	Votes	%	±%
Democratic	Richard Lamm (incumbent)	483,985	58.76%	+5.54%
Republican	Ted L. Strickland	317,292	38.53%	−7.18%
Tea	Roy Peister	13,990	1.70%	+1.70%
Socialist Workers	Elsa Blum	3,690	0.45%	+0.45%
Newtist	Sal A. Mander	2,452	0.30%	+0.30%
Prohibition	Earl Dodge	2,198	0.27%	−0.50%
Total votes		823,607	100.00%	

1982 Colorado gubernatorial election
Party	Candidate	Votes	%	±%
Democratic	Richard Lamm (incumbent)	627,960	65.69%	+6.93%
Republican	John Fuhr	302,740	31.67%	−6.86%
Libertarian	Paul K. Grant	19,349	2.02%	+2.02%
Prohibition	Earl Dodge	3,496	0.37%	+0.10%
Socialist Workers	Alan Gummerson	2,476	0.26%	−0.19%
Total votes		956,021	100.00%	

1986 Colorado gubernatorial election
Party	Candidate	Votes	%	±%
Democratic	Roy Romer	616,325	58.20%	−7.49%
Republican	Ted L. Strickland	434,420	41.03%	+9.36%
Prohibition	Earl Dodge	8,183	0.77%	+0.40%
Total votes		1,058,928	100.00%	

1990 Colorado United States Senate election
Party	Candidate	Votes	%	±%
Republican	Hank Brown	569,048	55.68%	−8.57%
Democratic	Josie Heath	425,746	41.66%	+7.04%
Concerns of the People	John Heckman	15,432	1.51%	+1.51%
Prohibition	Earl Dodge	11,801	1.16%	+1.05%
Total votes		1,022,027	100.00%	

1994 Colorado gubernatorial election
Party	Candidate	Votes	%	±%
Democratic	Roy Romer (incumbent)	619,205	55.46%	−6.43%
Republican	Bruce D. Benson	432,042	38.70%	+3.27%
Constitution	Kevin Swanson	40,397	3.62%	+3.62%
Green	Phillip Huggord	16,956	1.52%	+1.52%
Prohibition	Earl Dodge	7,722	0.69%	+0.09%
Independent	Thomas F. Todd (write-in)	123	0.01%	+0.01%
Total votes		1,116,445	100.00%	

1998 University of Colorado at-large Regent election
Party	Candidate	Votes	%
Republican	Jim Martin	639,538	54.73%
Democratic	Douglas Naiman	437,870	37.47%
Green	Dean Myerson	41,063	3.51%
Natural Law	Barbara Foster	39,045	3.34%
Prohibition	Earl Dodge	10,415	0.89%
Write-in		694	0.06%
Total votes		1,116,445	100.00%

== Notes ==
Party political offices
Preceded by Benjamin C. Bubar	Prohibition Party presidential candidate 1984, 1988, 1992, 1996, 2000, 2004	Succeeded by Gene Amondson
Preceded by Marshall E. Uncapher	Prohibition Party vice presidential candidate 1976, 1980	Succeeded by Warren C. Martin
