= American Prohibition Foundation =

The American Prohibition Foundation is a Colorado corporation created in 2002 by a faction of the Prohibition Party headed by Earl Dodge. It is not associated with the National Prohibition Foundation which was originally incorporated in Indiana in 1952. Both foundations exist to promote the work of the temperance movement and prohibition.
