= 2016 United States presidential election in Arkansas =

- November 8, 2016
- Turnout: 64.65% ▼

Nominee	Donald Trump	Hillary Clinton
Party	Republican	Democratic
Home state	New York	New York
Running mate	Mike Pence	Tim Kaine
Electoral vote	6	0
Popular vote	684,872	380,494
Percentage	60.57%	33.65%

Trump
40–50%
50–60%
60–70%
70–80%
80–90%
90–100%
Clinton
40–50%
50–60%
60–70%
70–80%
80–90%
90–100%
Tie/No Data
President before election
Barack Obama
Democratic
Elected President
Donald Trump
Republican

Treemap of the popular vote by county

The 2016 United States presidential election in Arkansas was held on Tuesday, November 8, 2016, as part of the 2016 United States presidential election in which all 50 states plus the District of Columbia participated. Arkansas voters chose electors to represent them in the Electoral College via a popular vote, pitting the Republican Party's nominee, businessman Donald Trump, and running mate Indiana Governor Mike Pence against Democratic Party nominee, former Secretary of State Hillary Clinton, and her running mate Virginia Senator Tim Kaine. Arkansas has six electoral votes in the Electoral College.

Although Clinton once served as the First Lady of Arkansas from 1979 to 1981 and from 1983 to 1992 as the wife of then-Governor Bill Clinton, Arkansas was considered to be a state Trump would win or otherwise a safe red state. Bill Clinton won the state twice in 1992 and 1996, but the state has trended Republican in every election since 2000, and no Democrat has won a statewide election there since 2010. Trump won the state with 60.57% of the vote, and Hillary Clinton received 33.65% of the vote. The Republican candidate has carried Arkansas in every election starting in 2000. This is also the first election in which the state simultaneously voted for a Republican presidential candidate and a Republican Senate candidate. Arkansas was 1 of 11 states that voted twice for Bill Clinton in 1992 and 1996, which Hillary Clinton lost in 2016.

Trump's 60.57% share of the vote is the best result for the Republicans in Arkansas since Richard Nixon in 1972. He flipped Woodruff County, making him the first Republican to win it since 1972. The Prohibition Party candidate, James Hedges, also had the notable achievement of finishing third in Arkansas County, ahead of major third-party candidates Gary Johnson and Jill Stein, the only county in the country where he did so.

== Primary elections ==
On March 1, 2016, in the presidential primaries, Arkansas voters expressed their preferences for the Democratic, Republican, Green, Libertarian, Constitution, and Prohibition parties' respective nominees for president. Registered members of each party only voted in their party's primary, while voters who were unaffiliated chose any one primary in which to vote.

=== Democratic primary ===
Results of the Democratic primary by county. Bernie Sanders took Newton County and Carroll County. All others went to Hillary Clinton. Hillary Clinton Bernie Sanders

==== Results ====
Primary date: March 1, 2016
National delegates: 37

2016 Democratic Party's presidential nominating process in Arkansas – Summary of results –
Candidate	Popular vote		Estimated delegates		
Candidate	Count	Percentage	Pledged	Unpledged	Total
Hillary Clinton	146,057	66.08%	22	5	27
Bernie Sanders	66,236	29.97%	10	0	10
Martin O'Malley (withdrawn)	2,785	1.26%			
John Wolfe Jr.	2,556	1.16%			
James Valentine	1,702	0.77%			
Rocky De La Fuente	1,684	0.76%			
Total	221,020	100%	32	5	37

=== Republican primary ===
Republican primary results by county. Donald J. Trump Ted Cruz Marco Rubio

Twelve candidates appeared on the Republican presidential primary ballot:

Arkansas Republican primary, March 1, 2016
Candidate	Votes	Percentage	Actual delegate count		
Candidate	Votes	Percentage	Bound	Unbound	Total
Donald Trump	134,744	32.79%	16	0	16
Ted Cruz	125,340	30.50%	15	0	15
Marco Rubio	101,910	24.80%	9	0	9
Ben Carson	23,521	5.72%	0	0	0
John Kasich	15,305	3.72%	0	0	0
Mike Huckabee (withdrawn)	4,792	1.17%	0	0	0
Jeb Bush (withdrawn)	2,402	0.58%	0	0	0
Rand Paul (withdrawn)	1,151	0.28%	0	0	0
Chris Christie (withdrawn)	631	0.15%	0	0	0
Carly Fiorina (withdrawn)	411	0.10%	0	0	0
Rick Santorum (withdrawn)	292	0.07%	0	0	0
Lindsey Graham (withdrawn)	252	0.06%	0	0	0
Bobby Jindal (withdrawn)	169	0.04%	0	0	0
Unprojected delegates:			0	0	0
Total:	410,920	100.00%	40	0	40
Source: The Green Papers

== General election ==
=== Predictions ===
The following are final 2016 predictions from various organizations for Arkansas as of Election Day.

Source	Ranking	As of
Los Angeles Times	Safe R	November 6, 2016
CNN	Safe R	November 8, 2016
Rothenberg Political Report	Safe R	November 7, 2016
Sabato's Crystal Ball	Safe R	November 7, 2016
NBC	Likely R	November 7, 2016
RealClearPolitics	Safe R	November 8, 2016
Fox News	Safe R	November 7, 2016
ABC	Safe R	November 7, 2016

=== Results ===
2016 United States presidential election in Arkansas
Party	Candidate	Running mate	Votes	%	Electoral votes
Republican	Donald Trump	Mike Pence	684,872	60.57%	6
Democratic	Hillary Clinton	Tim Kaine	380,494	33.65%	0
Libertarian	Gary Johnson	Bill Weld	29,949	2.65%	0
Independent	Evan McMullin	Nathan Johnson	13,176	1.17%	0
Green	Jill Stein	Ajamu Baraka	9,473	0.84%	0
Prohibition Party	Jim Hedges	Bill Bayes	4,709	0.42%	0
Constitution	Darrell L. Castle	Scott N. Bradley	4,613	0.41%	0
Independent	Lynn S. Kahn	Kathleen Monahan	3,390	0.30%	0
Total			1,130,676	100.00%	6

==== By county ====
County	Donald Trump Republican		Hillary Clinton Democratic		Various candidates Other parties		Margin		Total
County	#	%	#	%	#	%	#	%	Total
Arkansas	3,826	61.59%	1,939	31.21%	447	7.20%	1,887	30.38%	6,212
Ashley	5,338	66.04%	2,408	29.79%	337	4.17%	2,930	36.25%	8,083
Baxter	14,682	74.28%	4,169	21.09%	915	4.63%	10,513	53.19%	19,766
Benton	60,871	62.87%	28,005	28.92%	7,948	8.21%	32,866	33.94%	96,824
Boone	12,235	75.94%	2,926	18.16%	950	5.90%	9,309	57.78%	16,111
Bradley	2,164	59.24%	1,317	36.05%	172	4.71%	847	23.19%	3,653
Calhoun	1,556	68.58%	639	28.16%	74	3.26%	917	40.41%	2,269
Carroll	6,786	63.08%	3,342	31.07%	630	5.86%	3,444	32.01%	10,758
Chicot	1,716	41.09%	2,350	56.27%	110	2.63%	-634	-15.18%	4,176
Clark	4,404	51.65%	3,620	42.46%	502	5.89%	784	9.20%	8,526
Clay	3,781	72.71%	1,199	23.06%	220	4.23%	2,582	49.65%	5,200
Cleburne	9,458	78.26%	2,101	17.39%	526	4.35%	7,357	60.88%	12,085
Cleveland	2,462	73.40%	723	21.56%	169	5.04%	1,739	51.85%	3,354
Columbia	5,456	61.39%	3,140	35.33%	291	3.27%	2,316	26.06%	8,887
Conway	4,849	61.17%	2,656	33.51%	422	5.32%	2,193	27.66%	7,927
Craighead	22,892	64.35%	10,538	29.62%	2,143	6.02%	12,354	34.73%	35,573
Crawford	16,686	74.33%	4,488	19.99%	1,276	5.68%	12,198	54.33%	22,450
Crittenden	6,964	43.66%	8,410	52.72%	578	3.62%	-1,446	-9.06%	15,952
Cross	4,584	66.69%	1,999	29.08%	291	4.23%	2,585	37.61%	6,874
Dallas	1,509	54.46%	1,165	42.04%	97	3.50%	344	12.41%	2,771
Desha	1,919	45.08%	2,228	52.34%	110	2.58%	-309	-7.26%	4,257
Drew	3,968	60.17%	2,365	35.86%	262	3.97%	1,603	24.31%	6,595
Faulkner	29,346	61.75%	14,629	30.78%	3,552	7.47%	14,717	30.97%	47,527
Franklin	5,039	74.43%	1,376	20.32%	355	5.24%	3,663	54.11%	6,770
Fulton	3,471	72.74%	1,067	22.36%	234	4.90%	2,404	50.38%	4,772
Garland	26,087	63.93%	12,311	30.17%	2,407	5.90%	13,776	33.76%	40,805
Grant	5,725	76.90%	1,373	18.44%	347	4.66%	4,352	58.46%	7,445
Greene	10,720	73.42%	3,071	21.03%	809	5.54%	7,649	52.39%	14,600
Hempstead	4,401	62.43%	2,377	33.72%	271	3.84%	2,024	28.71%	7,049
Hot Spring	8,172	68.42%	3,149	26.36%	623	5.22%	5,023	42.05%	11,944
Howard	3,157	67.54%	1,351	28.90%	166	3.55%	1,806	38.64%	4,674
Independence	9,936	72.98%	2,881	21.16%	797	5.85%	7,055	51.82%	13,614
Izard	4,042	74.19%	1,113	20.43%	293	5.38%	2,929	53.76%	5,448
Jackson	3,267	63.36%	1,583	30.70%	306	5.93%	1,684	32.66%	5,156
Jefferson	9,250	35.72%	15,772	60.91%	872	3.37%	-6,522	-25.19%	25,894
Johnson	6,091	66.85%	2,427	26.64%	594	6.52%	3,664	40.21%	9,112
Lafayette	1,758	61.47%	1,032	36.08%	70	2.45%	726	25.38%	2,860
Lawrence	4,064	71.49%	1,263	22.22%	358	6.30%	2,801	49.27%	5,685
Lee	1,229	40.61%	1,735	57.34%	62	2.05%	-506	-16.72%	3,026
Lincoln	2,455	64.17%	1,252	32.72%	119	3.11%	1,203	31.44%	3,826
Little River	3,605	68.97%	1,397	26.73%	225	4.30%	2,208	42.24%	5,227
Logan	5,746	72.54%	1,715	21.65%	460	5.81%	4,031	50.89%	7,921
Lonoke	19,958	73.65%	5,664	20.90%	1,478	5.45%	14,294	52.75%	27,100
Madison	4,928	72.04%	1,588	23.21%	325	4.75%	3,340	48.82%	6,841
Marion	5,336	75.08%	1,434	20.18%	337	4.74%	3,902	54.90%	7,107
Miller	11,294	70.19%	4,273	26.56%	524	3.26%	7,021	43.63%	16,091
Mississippi	7,061	53.48%	5,670	42.94%	473	3.58%	1,391	10.53%	13,204
Monroe	1,489	51.63%	1,312	45.49%	83	2.88%	177	6.14%	2,884
Montgomery	2,643	74.26%	748	21.02%	168	4.72%	1,895	53.25%	3,559
Nevada	2,000	61.61%	1,157	35.64%	89	2.74%	843	25.97%	3,246
Newton	2,875	76.61%	699	18.63%	179	4.77%	2,176	57.98%	3,753
Ouachita	5,351	53.86%	4,321	43.49%	263	2.65%	1,030	10.37%	9,935
Perry	3,008	69.86%	1,049	24.36%	249	5.78%	1,959	45.49%	4,306
Phillips	2,446	35.18%	4,310	61.99%	197	2.83%	-1,864	-26.81%	6,953
Pike	3,150	79.13%	685	17.21%	146	3.67%	2,465	61.92%	3,981
Poinsett	5,502	71.25%	1,880	24.35%	340	4.40%	3,622	46.90%	7,722
Polk	6,618	80.40%	1,212	14.72%	401	4.87%	5,406	65.68%	8,231
Pope	16,256	72.03%	5,000	22.15%	1,313	5.82%	11,256	49.87%	22,569
Prairie	2,505	72.74%	814	23.64%	125	3.63%	1,691	49.10%	3,444
Pulaski	61,257	38.34%	89,574	56.06%	8,945	5.60%	-28,317	-17.72%	159,776
Randolph	4,509	70.69%	1,425	22.34%	445	6.98%	3,084	48.35%	6,379
Saline	35,863	68.83%	13,256	25.44%	2,981	5.72%	22,607	43.39%	52,100
Scott	2,731	77.81%	602	17.15%	177	5.04%	2,129	60.66%	3,510
Searcy	2,955	79.27%	601	16.12%	172	4.61%	2,354	63.14%	3,728
Sebastian	29,127	65.25%	12,300	27.56%	3,210	7.19%	16,827	37.70%	44,637
Sevier	3,282	71.94%	1,075	23.56%	205	4.49%	2,207	48.38%	4,562
Sharp	5,407	74.59%	1,472	20.31%	370	5.10%	3,935	54.28%	7,249
St. Francis	3,195	43.00%	4,031	54.25%	204	2.75%	-836	-11.25%	7,430
Stone	4,113	73.21%	1,203	21.41%	302	5.38%	2,910	51.80%	5,618
Union	10,456	61.89%	5,855	34.66%	583	3.45%	4,601	27.23%	16,894
Van Buren	5,382	73.33%	1,549	21.11%	408	5.56%	3,833	52.23%	7,339
Washington	41,476	50.67%	33,366	40.76%	7,019	8.57%	8,110	9.91%	81,861
White	21,077	75.28%	5,170	18.46%	1,752	6.26%	15,907	56.81%	27,999
Woodruff	1,347	52.39%	1,118	43.49%	106	4.12%	229	8.91%	2,571
Yell	4,608	71.56%	1,480	22.98%	351	5.45%	3,128	48.58%	6,439
Totals	684,872	60.57%	380,494	33.65%	65,310	5.78%	304,378	26.92%	1,130,676

Counties that flipped from Democratic to Republican

- Woodruff (largest city: Augusta)

==== By congressional district ====
Trump won all four of the state's congressional districts.

District	Trump	Clinton	Representative
1st	65%	30%	Rick Crawford
2nd	52%	42%	French Hill
3rd	62%	30%	Steve Womack
4th	64%	31%	Bruce Westerman

=== Turnout ===
The voter turnout in Arkansas was 64.65% with 1,137,772 ballots cast out of 1,759,974 registered voters.

== See also ==
- United States presidential elections in Arkansas
- 2016 Democratic Party presidential debates and forums
- 2016 Democratic Party presidential primaries
- 2016 Republican Party presidential debates and forums
- 2016 Republican Party presidential primaries
