= 2004 United States presidential election in North Dakota =

- November 2, 2004
- Turnout: 64.89% ▲3.18 pp

Nominee	George W. Bush	John Kerry
Party	Republican	Democratic–NPL
Home state	Texas	Massachusetts
Running mate	Dick Cheney	John Edwards
Electoral vote	3	0
Popular vote	196,651	111,052
Percentage	62.86%	35.50%
County results
Bush
50–60%
60–70%
70–80%
Kerry
50–60%
60–70%
70–80%
President before election
George W. Bush
Republican
Elected President
George W. Bush
Republican

The 2004 United States presidential election in North Dakota took place on November 2, 2004, and was part of the 2004 United States presidential election. Voters chose three representatives, or electors, to the Electoral College, who voted for president and vice president.

North Dakota was won by incumbent President George W. Bush by a 27.36% margin of victory. Prior to the election, all 12 news organizations considered this a state Bush would win, or otherwise considered as a safe red state. The state has voted Republican in all but six presidential elections since statehood. In 2004, George W. Bush defeated John Kerry with 62.86% of the vote, even as incumbent Democratic Senator Byron Dorgan overwhelmingly won re-election to the senate on the same ballot. The state's population of about 650,000 is little changed from what it was 80 years ago, as North Dakota is one of seven states with the minimum of three electoral votes.

== Caucuses ==
- 2004 North Dakota Democratic presidential caucuses
- 2004 North Dakota Republican presidential caucuses

== Campaign ==
=== Predictions ===
There were 12 news organizations who made state-by-state predictions of the election. Here are their last predictions before election day.

Source	Ranking
D.C. Political Report	Solid R
Cook Political Report	Solid R
Research 2000	Solid R
Zogby International	Likely R
Washington Post	Likely R
Washington Dispatch	Likely R
Washington Times	Solid R
The New York Times	Solid R
CNN	Likely R
Newsweek	Solid R
Associated Press	Solid R
Rasmussen Reports	Likely R

=== Polling ===
Bush won both pre-election polls with a double-digit margin.

=== Fundraising ===
Bush raised $135,493. Kerry raised $36,600.

=== Advertising and visits ===
Neither campaign visited or advertised in this state during the fall campaign.

== Analysis ==
In 2000, Al Gore won two counties, compared to Kerry who won four counties in the state, including his best performance in Sioux County, where he won with seventy percent of the vote. Overall, Bush dominated the state, winning a wide majority of the state's counties, and with large margins. In just two counties – both majority Native American – did Bush obtain less than 44 percent of the vote. This was the last election in which the Republican nominee won Cass County by majority until 2024.

== Results ==
2004 United States presidential election in North Dakota
Party	Candidate	Votes	%	±%
Republican	George W. Bush (incumbent)	196,651	62.86%	
Democratic–NPL	John Kerry	111,052	35.50%	
Independent	Ralph Nader	3,756	1.20%	
Libertarian	Michael Badnarik	851	0.27%	
Constitution	Michael Peroutka	514	0.16%	
Write In	Martin Wishnatsky	9	0.00%	
Total votes		312,833	100.00%	
Turnout			64.2%	

=== Results by county ===
County	George W. Bush Republican		John Kerry Democratic-NPL		Ralph Nader Independent		Michael Badnarik Libertarian		Michael Peroutka Constitution		Margin		Total votes cast
County	#	%	#	%	#	%	#	%	#	%	#	%	Total votes cast
Adams	915	70.88%	353	27.34%	15	1.16%	3	0.23%	5	0.39%	562	43.54%	1,291
Barnes	3,541	60.92%	2,186	37.61%	64	1.10%	9	0.15%	13	0.22%	1,355	23.31%	5,813
Benson	1,002	44.61%	1,196	53.25%	26	1.16%	15	0.67%	7	0.31%	-194	-8.64%	2,246
Billings	449	79.61%	99	17.55%	9	1.60%	1	0.18%	6	1.06%	350	62.06%	564
Bottineau	2,468	67.17%	1,168	31.79%	33	0.90%	3	0.08%	2	0.05%	1,300	35.38%	3,674
Bowman	1,280	74.59%	397	23.14%	29	1.69%	3	0.17%	6	0.35%	883	51.45%	1,716 (Note: In this county there was one write-in vote for Martin Wishnatsky.)
Burke	808	69.36%	336	28.84%	13	1.12%	5	0.43%	3	0.26%	472	40.52%	1,165
Burleigh	26,577	68.47%	11,621	29.94%	489	1.26%	78	0.20%	48	0.12%	14,956	38.53%	38,814
Cass	39,619	59.39%	26,010	38.99%	732	1.10%	234	0.35%	112	0.17%	13,609	20.40%	66,711 (Note: In this county there were a total of four write-in vote for Martin Wishnatsky.)
Cavalier	1,522	62.27%	887	36.29%	29	1.19%	1	0.04%	5	0.20%	635	25.98%	2,444
Dickey	1,890	67.00%	883	31.30%	34	1.21%	7	0.25%	7	0.25%	1,007	35.70%	2,821
Divide	751	59.23%	487	38.41%	26	2.05%	3	0.24%	1	0.08%	264	20.82%	1,268
Dunn	1,178	66.40%	571	32.19%	16	0.90%	2	0.11%	7	0.39%	607	34.21%	1,774
Eddy	655	54.00%	534	44.02%	18	1.48%	1	0.08%	5	0.41%	121	9.98%	1,213
Emmons	1,449	68.58%	611	28.92%	43	2.04%	9	0.43%	1	0.05%	838	39.66%	2,113
Foster	1,219	69.03%	518	29.33%	20	1.13%	6	0.34%	3	0.17%	701	39.70%	1,766
Golden Valley	719	77.56%	195	21.04%	6	0.65%	3	0.32%	4	0.43%	524	56.52%	927
Grand Forks	17,298	56.77%	12,646	41.50%	348	1.14%	137	0.45%	41	0.13%	4,652	15.27%	30,470
Grant	952	76.65%	264	21.26%	16	1.29%	4	0.32%	6	0.48%	688	55.39%	1,242
Griggs	907	63.03%	505	35.09%	14	0.97%	9	0.63%	4	0.28%	402	27.94%	1,439
Hettinger	1,044	69.88%	405	27.11%	35	2.34%	6	0.40%	4	0.27%	639	42.77%	1,494
Kidder	902	65.89%	433	31.63%	20	1.46%	7	0.51%	7	0.51%	469	34.26%	1,369
LaMoure	1,592	68.18%	712	30.49%	17	0.73%	5	0.21%	9	0.39%	880	37.69%	2,335
Logan	844	74.69%	265	23.45%	15	1.33%	2	0.18%	4	0.35%	579	51.24%	1,130
McHenry	1,744	61.84%	1,030	36.52%	36	1.28%	7	0.25%	3	0.11%	714	25.32%	2,820
McIntosh	1,254	72.82%	436	25.32%	24	1.39%	3	0.17%	5	0.29%	818	47.50%	1,722
McKenzie	1,897	68.68%	847	30.67%	15	0.54%	2	0.07%	1	0.04%	1,050	38.01%	2,762
McLean	3,014	63.45%	1,664	35.03%	57	1.20%	8	0.17%	7	0.15%	1,350	28.42%	4,750
Mercer	3,285	71.17%	1,245	26.97%	68	1.47%	8	0.17%	10	0.22%	2,040	44.20%	4,616
Morton	8,325	65.90%	4,073	32.24%	191	1.51%	31	0.25%	13	0.10%	4,252	33.66%	12,633
Mountrail	1,527	50.40%	1,465	48.35%	30	0.99%	6	0.20%	2	0.07%	62	2.05%	3,030
Nelson	1,107	57.60%	778	40.48%	26	1.35%	6	0.31%	5	0.26%	329	17.12%	1,922
Oliver	790	70.60%	310	27.70%	15	1.34%	1	0.09%	3	0.27%	480	42.90%	1,119
Pembina	2,466	63.95%	1,321	34.26%	53	1.37%	8	0.21%	8	0.21%	1,145	29.69%	3,856
Pierce	1,475	67.20%	686	31.25%	24	1.09%	2	0.09%	8	0.36%	789	35.95%	2,195
Ramsey	2,943	60.06%	1,885	38.47%	58	1.18%	9	0.18%	5	0.10%	1,058	21.59%	4,900
Ransom	1,352	51.96%	1,199	46.08%	40	1.54%	9	0.35%	2	0.08%	153	5.88%	2,602
Renville	953	64.87%	497	33.83%	18	1.23%	1	0.07%	0	0.00%	456	31.04%	1,469
Richland	5,264	64.08%	2,821	34.34%	94	1.14%	25	0.30%	11	0.13%	2,443	29.74%	8,215
Rolette	1,392	34.42%	2,564	63.40%	66	1.63%	15	0.37%	7	0.17%	-1,172	-28.98%	4,044
Sargent	1,147	52.14%	1,021	46.41%	28	1.27%	4	0.18%	0	0.00%	126	5.73%	2,200
Sheridan	727	77.01%	200	21.19%	12	1.27%	4	0.42%	1	0.11%	527	55.82%	944
Sioux	319	27.98%	804	70.53%	12	1.05%	2	0.18%	3	0.26%	-485	-42.55%	1,140
Slope	335	77.55%	89	20.60%	5	1.16%	2	0.46%	1	0.23%	246	56.95%	432
Stark	7,220	69.42%	3,013	28.97%	126	1.21%	19	0.18%	22	0.21%	4,207	40.45%	10,400
Steele	586	48.31%	616	50.78%	7	0.58%	2	0.16%	2	0.16%	-30	-2.47%	1,213
Stutsman	6,517	64.38%	3,438	33.97%	135	1.33%	19	0.19%	13	0.13%	3,079	30.41%	10,122
Towner	754	54.21%	606	43.57%	25	1.80%	2	0.14%	4	0.29%	148	10.64%	1,391
Traill	2,543	59.86%	1,651	38.87%	43	1.01%	6	0.14%	5	0.12%	892	20.99%	4,248
Walsh	3,194	61.59%	1,905	36.73%	61	1.18%	17	0.33%	9	0.17%	1,289	24.86%	5,186
Ward	17,008	66.41%	8,236	32.16%	276	1.08%	60	0.23%	32	0.12%	8,772	34.25%	25,612
Wells	1,654	64.58%	858	33.50%	35	1.37%	3	0.12%	9	0.35%	796	31.08%	2,561 (Note: In this county there were a total of two write-in vote for Martin Wishnatsky.)
Williams	6,278	70.31%	2,512	28.13%	109	1.22%	18	0.20%	12	0.13%	3,766	42.18%	8,929
Totals	196,651	62.86%	111,052	35.50%	3,756	1.20%	851	0.27%	514	0.16%	85,599	27.36%	312,833

==== Counties that flipped from Republican to Democratic ====
- Benson (largest CDP: Fort Totten)
- Steele (largest city: Finley)

=== By congressional district ===
Due to the state's low population, only one congressional district is allocated. This district is an at-large district, because it covers the entire state, and thus is equivalent to the statewide election results.

District	Bush	Kerry	Representative
At-large	62.86%	35.5%	Earl Pomeroy

== Electors ==
Technically the voters of ND cast their ballots for electors: representatives to the Electoral College. ND is allocated three electors because it has one congressional district and two senators. All candidates who appear on the ballot or qualify to receive write-in votes must submit a list of three electors, who pledge to vote for their candidate and their running mate. Whoever wins the majority of votes in the state is awarded all three electoral votes. Their chosen electors then vote for president and vice president. Although electors are pledged to their candidate and running mate, they are not obligated to vote for them. An elector who votes for someone other than their candidate is known as a faithless elector.

The electors of each state and the District of Columbia met on December 13, 2004, to cast their votes for president and vice president. The Electoral College itself never meets as one body. Instead, the electors from each state and the District of Columbia met in their respective capitols.

The following were the members of the Electoral College from the state. All were pledged to and voted for Bush and Cheney:

1. Betsy Dalrymple (wife of Jack Dalrymple)
2. Ben Clayburgh
3. Jackie Williams

== See also ==
- United States presidential elections in North Dakota
- Presidency of George W. Bush
