= 2004 United States presidential election in Wisconsin =

- November 2, 2004
- Turnout: 72.9% (▲5.9 pp)

Nominee	John Kerry	George W. Bush
Party	Democratic	Republican
Home state	Massachusetts	Texas
Running mate	John Edwards	Dick Cheney
Electoral vote	10	0
Popular vote	1,489,504	1,478,120
Percentage	49.70%	49.32%

Kerry
40–50%
50–60%
60–70%
70–80%
80–90%
90–100%
Bush
40–50%
50–60%
60–70%
70–80%
80–90%
90–100%
Tie/no data
President before election
George W. Bush
Republican
Elected President
George W. Bush
Republican

The 2004 United States presidential election in Wisconsin took place on November 2, 2004, and was part of the 2004 United States presidential election. Voters chose 10 representatives, or electors, to the Electoral College, who voted for president and vice president.

Wisconsin was won by Democratic nominee John Kerry by a 0.38% margin of victory. Although no Republican had carried this state in a presidential election since Ronald Reagan in 1984, early polling showed the race was a toss-up, thus was considered as a possible target for the Republicans. Prior to the election, most news organizations considered this a toss-up, or a crucial swing state, and faced similar political scrutiny to neighboring Michigan, Minnesota, and Iowa. On election day, Kerry barely carried the state over President George W. Bush. The results in Wisconsin were nearly identical to the results from four years earlier, when Al Gore squeaked by Bush, and the 2020 presidential election when Joe Biden had a similarly narrow victory in Wisconsin against Donald Trump.

As of 2024, this is the most recent election to date in which Wisconsin voted for the losing candidate; thus, the state is tied with Michigan and Pennsylvania for the longest bellwether streak in the nation. This was also only the third and most recent time since 1960 (after 2000 and 1988) that it voted for the losing candidate. Bush is to date the only presidential candidate to win two terms in office without carrying Wisconsin at least once, as well as the most recent Republican to win without the state.

== Primaries ==
- 2004 Wisconsin Democratic presidential primary
- 2004 Wisconsin Republican presidential primary

== Campaign ==
=== Predictions ===
There were 12 news organizations that made state-by-state predictions of the election. Here are their last predictions before election day.

Source	Ranking
D.C. Political Report	Lean D
Associated Press	Toss-up
CNN	Likely R (flip)
Cook Political Report	Toss-up
Newsweek	Toss-up
New York Times	Toss-up
Rasmussen Reports	Toss-up
Research 2000	Toss-up
Washington Post	Toss-up
Washington Times	Toss-up
Zogby International	Likely D
Washington Dispatch	Likely R (flip)

=== Polling ===
Pre-election polling had Bush and Kerry winning polls, with neither candidate grasping a strong lead. The last three poll averages showed Bush leading 49% to 46%.

=== Fundraising ===
Bush raised $1,993,040. Kerry raised $1,130,602.

=== Advertising and visits ===
Bush visited the state 12 times. Kerry visited the state 14 times. A total of between $1.3 million to $3.6 million was spent each week.

== Analysis ==
Wisconsin has voted for the Democratic presidential nominee in the last four elections before the fifth time in 2004. The urban centers of Milwaukee and Madison tend to vote strongly Democratic. The suburbs of those cities are politically diverse but tend to vote Republican. Counties in the western part of the state tend to be liberal, a tradition passed down from Scandinavian immigrants. The rural areas in the northern and eastern part of the state are the most solidly Republican areas in Wisconsin.

The CNN exit polls showed a dead heat between the two. However, the deciding factor for Kerry's victory was union members who voted for him with 62%, while non-members (83% of the population) voted for Bush with just 52% of the vote.

== Results ==
2004 United States presidential election in Wisconsin
Party	Candidate	Votes	Percentage	Electoral votes
Democratic	John Kerry	1,489,504	49.70%	10
Republican	George W. Bush (incumbent)	1,478,120	49.32%	0
Independent	Ralph Nader	16,390	0.55%	0
Libertarian	Michael Badnarik	6,464	0.22%	0
Green	David Cobb	2,661	0.09%	0
Independent	Walt Brown	471	0.02%	0
Independent	Róger Calero	411	0.01%	0
Write Ins		2,986	0.10%	0
Totals		2,997,007	100.00%	10
Voter turnout (voting age population)				72.4%

=== By county ===
County	John Kerry Democratic		George W. Bush Republican		Various candidates Other parties		Margin		Total votes cast
County	#	%	#	%	#	%	#	%	Total votes cast
Adams	5,447	52.09%	4,890	46.77%	119	1.14%	557	5.32%	10,456
Ashland	5,805	63.10%	3,313	36.01%	81	0.88%	2,492	27.09%	9,199
Barron	11,696	48.86%	12,030	50.26%	211	0.89%	-334	-1.40%	23,937
Bayfield	5,845	60.26%	3,754	38.71%	100	1.03%	2,091	21.55%	9,699
Brown	54,935	44.56%	67,173	54.48%	1,186	0.96%	-12,238	-9.92%	123,294
Buffalo	3,998	52.67%	3,502	46.13%	91	1.20%	496	6.54%	7,591
Burnett	4,499	48.27%	4,743	50.89%	79	0.85%	-244	-2.62%	9,321
Calumet	10,290	40.71%	14,721	58.24%	265	1.05%	-4,431	-17.53%	25,276
Chippewa	14,751	48.33%	15,450	50.62%	323	1.06%	-699	-2.29%	30,524
Clark	6,966	46.06%	7,966	52.67%	193	1.27%	-1,000	-6.61%	15,125
Columbia	14,300	48.38%	14,956	50.60%	299	1.01%	-656	-2.22%	29,555
Crawford	4,656	55.04%	3,680	43.50%	123	1.45%	976	11.54%	8,459
Dane	181,052	66.02%	90,369	32.95%	2,828	1.03%	90,683	33.07%	274,249
Dodge	16,690	37.64%	27,201	61.35%	445	1.01%	-10,511	-23.71%	44,336
Door	8,367	47.84%	8,910	50.94%	214	1.22%	-543	-3.10%	17,491
Douglas	16,537	65.66%	8,448	33.54%	202	0.81%	8,089	32.12%	25,187
Dunn	12,039	51.95%	10,879	46.95%	254	1.09%	1,160	5.00%	23,172
Eau Claire	30,068	54.24%	24,653	44.47%	716	1.30%	5,415	9.77%	55,437
Florence	993	36.45%	1,703	62.52%	28	1.03%	-710	-26.07%	2,724
Fond du Lac	19,216	36.23%	33,291	62.77%	529	1.00%	-14,075	-26.54%	53,036
Forest	2,509	48.69%	2,608	50.61%	36	0.70%	-99	-1.92%	5,153
Grant	12,864	50.92%	12,208	48.32%	192	0.76%	656	2.60%	25,264
Green	9,575	52.47%	8,497	46.56%	176	0.96%	1,078	5.91%	18,248
Green Lake	3,605	35.42%	6,472	63.59%	101	0.99%	-2,867	-28.17%	10,178
Iowa	7,122	56.79%	5,348	42.64%	72	0.57%	1,774	14.15%	12,542
Iron	1,956	50.43%	1,884	48.57%	39	1.00%	72	1.86%	3,879
Jackson	5,249	53.97%	4,387	45.11%	90	0.92%	862	8.86%	9,726
Jefferson	17,925	42.56%	23,776	56.45%	414	0.98%	-5,851	-13.89%	42,115
Juneau	5,734	46.32%	6,473	52.29%	172	1.39%	-739	-5.97%	12,379
Kenosha	40,107	52.48%	35,587	46.56%	734	0.96%	4,520	5.92%	76,428
Kewaunee	5,175	45.91%	5,970	52.96%	128	1.13%	-795	-7.05%	11,273
La Crosse	33,170	53.38%	28,289	45.53%	677	1.09%	4,881	7.85%	62,136
Lafayette	4,402	52.48%	3,929	46.84%	57	0.68%	473	5.64%	8,388
Langlade	4,751	42.90%	6,235	56.30%	88	0.80%	-1,484	-13.40%	11,074
Lincoln	7,484	47.67%	8,024	51.11%	192	1.22%	-540	-3.44%	15,700
Manitowoc	20,652	46.77%	23,027	52.14%	481	1.09%	-2,375	-5.37%	44,160
Marathon	30,899	45.40%	36,394	53.47%	766	1.12%	-5,495	-8.07%	68,059
Marinette	10,190	45.76%	11,866	53.28%	214	0.96%	-1,676	-7.52%	22,270
Marquette	3,785	44.65%	4,604	54.31%	88	1.03%	-819	-9.66%	8,477
Menominee	1,412	82.57%	288	16.84%	10	0.58%	1,124	65.73%	1,710
Milwaukee	297,653	61.72%	180,287	37.39%	4,296	0.89%	117,366	24.33%	482,236
Monroe	8,973	45.89%	10,375	53.06%	206	1.05%	-1,402	-7.17%	19,554
Oconto	8,534	43.11%	11,043	55.79%	217	1.10%	-2,509	-12.68%	19,794
Oneida	10,464	47.48%	11,351	51.50%	224	1.02%	-887	-4.02%	22,039
Outagamie	40,169	44.61%	48,903	54.31%	978	1.09%	-8,734	-9.70%	90,050
Ozaukee	17,714	33.40%	34,904	65.82%	414	0.78%	-17,190	-32.42%	53,032
Pepin	2,181	53.64%	1,853	45.57%	32	0.79%	328	8.07%	4,066
Pierce	11,176	51.09%	10,437	47.71%	263	1.21%	739	3.38%	21,876
Polk	11,173	47.54%	12,095	51.46%	235	1.00%	-922	-3.92%	23,503
Portage	21,861	56.11%	16,546	42.47%	554	1.43%	5,315	13.64%	38,961
Price	4,349	49.63%	4,312	49.21%	102	1.17%	37	0.42%	8,763
Racine	48,229	47.48%	52,456	51.65%	884	0.87%	-4,227	-4.17%	101,569
Richland	4,501	47.78%	4,836	51.34%	83	0.88%	-335	-3.56%	9,420
Rock	46,598	57.90%	33,151	41.19%	730	0.91%	13,447	16.71%	80,479
Rusk	3,820	48.19%	3,985	50.27%	122	1.53%	-165	-2.08%	7,927
St. Croix	18,784	44.90%	22,679	54.21%	372	0.89%	-3,895	-9.31%	41,835
Sauk	15,708	51.64%	14,415	47.39%	294	0.96%	1,293	4.25%	30,417
Sawyer	4,411	46.66%	4,951	52.37%	91	0.97%	-540	-5.71%	9,453
Shawano	8,657	41.23%	12,150	57.86%	192	0.92%	-3,493	-16.63%	20,999
Sheboygan	27,608	44.08%	34,458	55.02%	559	0.90%	-6,850	-10.94%	62,625
Taylor	3,829	40.12%	5,582	58.49%	132	1.38%	-1,753	-18.37%	9,543
Trempealeau	8,075	57.42%	5,878	41.80%	109	0.77%	2,197	15.62%	14,062
Vernon	7,924	53.38%	6,774	45.63%	147	0.99%	1,150	7.75%	14,845
Vilas	5,713	40.80%	8,155	58.24%	134	0.95%	-2,442	-17.44%	14,002
Walworth	19,177	39.58%	28,754	59.35%	515	1.06%	-9,577	-19.77%	48,446
Washburn	4,705	49.18%	4,762	49.78%	100	1.05%	-57	-0.60%	9,567
Washington	21,234	29.30%	50,641	69.88%	592	0.82%	-29,407	-40.58%	72,467
Waukesha	73,626	31.96%	154,926	67.25%	1,811	0.79%	-81,300	-35.29%	230,363
Waupaca	10,792	40.01%	15,941	59.10%	241	0.89%	-5,149	-19.09%	26,974
Waushara	5,257	42.93%	6,888	56.25%	101	0.83%	-1,631	-13.32%	12,246
Winnebago	40,943	46.21%	46,542	52.53%	1,111	1.25%	-5,599	-6.32%	88,596
Wood	18,950	47.29%	20,592	51.39%	529	1.32%	-1,642	-4.10%	40,071
Totals	1,489,504	49.70%	1,478,120	49.32%	29,383	0.98%	11,384	0.38%	2,997,007

==== Counties that flipped from Republican to Democratic ====
- Iron (largest city: Hurley)
- Price (largest city: Park Falls)

==== Counties that flipped from Democratic to Republican ====
- Columbia (largest city: Portage)

=== By congressional district ===
Kerry and Bush each won four of eight congressional districts.

District	Bush	Kerry	Representative
1st	53%	46%	Paul Ryan
2nd	37%	62%	Tammy Baldwin
3rd	48%	51%	Ron Kind
4th	30%	69%	Jerry Kleczka
4th	30%	69%	Gwen Moore
5th	63%	36%	Jim Sensenbrenner
6th	56%	42%	Tom Petri
7th	49%	50%	Dave Obey
8th	55%	44%	Mark Andrew Green

== Electors ==
Technically the voters of Wisconsin cast their ballots for electors: representatives to the Electoral College. Wisconsin is allocated 10 electors because it has eight congressional districts and two senators. All candidates who appear on the ballot or qualify to receive write-in votes must submit a list of 10 electors, who pledge to vote for their candidate and his or her running mate. Whoever wins the majority of votes in the state is awarded all 10 electoral votes. Their chosen electors then vote for president and vice president. Although electors are pledged to their candidate and running mate, they are not obligated to vote for them. An elector who votes for someone other than his or her candidate is known as a faithless elector.

The electors of each state and the District of Columbia met on December 13, 2004, to cast their votes for president and vice president. The Electoral College itself never meets as one body. Instead, the electors from each state and the District of Columbia met in their respective capitols.

The following were the members of the Electoral College from the state. All 10 were pledged for Kerry/Edwards.

1. Gail Gabrelian
2. Margaret McEntire
3. Jordan Franklin
4. Martha Toran
5. Jim Shinners
6. Jan Banicki
7. Daniel Hannula
8. Steve Mellenthin
9. Glenn Carlson
10. Linda Honold

== See also ==
- United States presidential elections in Wisconsin
