= 2004 United States presidential election in Louisiana =

- November 2, 2004

Nominee	George W. Bush	John Kerry
Party	Republican	Democratic
Home state	Texas	Massachusetts
Running mate	Dick Cheney	John Edwards
Electoral vote	9	0
Popular vote	1,102,169	820,299
Percentage	56.72%	42.22%

Bush
40–50%
50–60%
60–70%
70–80%
80–90%
Kerry
40–50%
50–60%
70–80%
President before election
George W. Bush
Republican
Elected President
George W. Bush
Republican

The 2004 United States presidential election in Louisiana took place on November 2, 2004, and was part of the 2004 United States presidential election. Voters chose nine representatives, or electors to the Electoral College, who voted for president and vice president.

Louisiana was won by incumbent President George W. Bush by a 14.5 percent margin. Prior to the election, all twelve news organizations considered this a state Bush would win, or otherwise a red state. Bush's performance constituted a much wider margin than that of his 2000 results, where he won by a 7.7 percent margin. The state, like other states in the Deep South, is racially polarized when it comes to presidential elections, as a wide majority of the white population votes Republican, and a wide majority of the black population votes Democratic.

In this election, Louisiana voted 12.05% to the right of the nation at-large. As of the 2024 election, this is the last time Assumption and Pointe Coupee parishes voted for a Democrat, and the last in which Caddo and East Baton Rouge parishes voted for a Republican.

== Primaries ==
- 2004 Louisiana Democratic presidential primary
- 2004 Louisiana Republican presidential primary

== Campaign ==
=== Predictions ===
There were 12 news organizations who made state-by-state predictions of the election. Here are their last predictions before election day.

Source	Ranking
D.C. Political Report	Lean R
Cook Political Report	Solid R
Research 2000	Solid R
Zogby International	Likely R
Washington Post	Likely R
Washington Dispatch	Likely R
Washington Times	Solid R
The New York Times	Solid R
CNN	Likely R
Newsweek	Solid R
Associated Press	Lean R
Rasmussen Reports	Likely R

=== Polling ===
Bush won every single pre-election poll, and won each with at least 48 percent of the vote. The final 3 polls averaged Bush leading 51 to 39 percent.

=== Fundraising ===
Bush raised $1,933,549. Kerry raised $1,303,859.

=== Advertising and visits ===
Neither campaign advertised or visited this state during the fall election.

== Analysis ==
Bush performed better here than he did in 2000. He won four more parishes: Caddo, Bienville, Saint Landry, and West Baton Rouge, but he won each with very slim margins of victory of less than two percent, except for West Baton Rouge which he won with 54 percent of the vote, indicating that parish as trending Republican. In the northern portion of the state, Bush barely lost in Madison and Tensas. The only two parishes in which he got less than forty percent of the vote were East Carroll and Orleans. Bush also won six of seven congressional districts in the state, each with at least 58 percent of the vote. The Second District, which covers the parish and city of Orleans, was won by Kerry with seventy percent of the vote; in other words, no congressional district in the state was competitive. As of the 2024 presidential election, this is the last election in which East Baton Rouge Parish and Caddo Parish voted for a Republican presidential candidate. Conversely, this is the last election in which Assumption Parish and Pointe Coupee Parish voted for a Democratic presidential candidate.

== Results ==
2004 United States presidential election in Louisiana
Party	Candidate	Votes	Percentage	Electoral votes
Republican	George W. Bush (incumbent)	1,102,169	56.72%	9
Democratic	John Kerry	820,299	42.22%	0
Independent	Ralph Nader	7,032	0.36%	0
American Independent	Michael Peroutka	5,203	0.27%	0
Libertarian	Michael Badnarik	2,781	0.14%	0
Independent	Walt Brown	1,795	0.09%	0
Independent	Gene Amondson	1,566	0.08%	0
Green	David Cobb	1,276	0.07%	0
Socialist Workers	James Harris	985	0.05%	0
Invalid or blank votes		169,510	1.35%	—
Totals		1,943,106	100.00%	9
Voter turnout (Voting age population)				58.5%

=== Results by parish ===
Parish	George W. Bush Republican		John Kerry Democratic		Various candidates Other parties		Margin		Total votes cast
Parish	#	%	#	%	#	%	#	%	Total votes cast
Acadia	16,083	63.75%	8,937	35.42%	210	0.83%	7,146	28.33%	25,230
Allen	5,140	56.33%	3,791	41.55%	193	2.12%	1,349	14.78%	9,124
Ascension	24,661	63.07%	13,955	35.69%	484	1.24%	10,706	27.38%	39,100
Assumption	4,966	46.26%	5,585	52.03%	184	1.71%	-619	-5.77%	10,735
Avoyelles	8,302	53.48%	6,976	44.93%	247	1.59%	1,326	8.55%	15,525
Beauregard	9,470	71.30%	3,666	27.60%	145	1.09%	5,804	43.70%	13,281
Bienville	3,612	50.47%	3,399	47.49%	146	2.04%	213	2.98%	7,157
Bossier	30,040	70.34%	12,317	28.84%	348	0.81%	17,723	41.50%	42,705
Caddo	54,292	50.93%	51,739	48.54%	564	0.53%	2,553	2.39%	106,595
Calcasieu	46,075	57.81%	32,864	41.24%	759	0.95%	13,211	16.57%	79,698
Caldwell	3,308	69.61%	1,384	29.12%	60	1.26%	1,924	40.49%	4,752
Cameron	3,190	68.75%	1,367	29.46%	83	1.79%	1,823	39.29%	4,640
Catahoula	3,219	64.98%	1,673	33.77%	62	1.25%	1,546	31.21%	4,954
Claiborne	3,704	55.87%	2,854	43.05%	72	1.09%	850	12.82%	6,630
Concordia	5,427	60.43%	3,446	38.37%	107	1.19%	1,981	22.06%	8,980
DeSoto	6,211	54.79%	5,026	44.34%	99	0.87%	1,185	10.45%	11,336
East Baton Rouge	99,943	54.42%	82,298	44.81%	1,401	0.76%	17,645	9.61%	183,642
East Carroll	1,357	39.97%	1,980	58.32%	58	1.71%	-623	-18.35%	3,395
East Feliciana	5,021	54.57%	4,091	44.46%	89	0.97%	930	10.11%	9,201
Evangeline	7,949	56.86%	5,757	41.18%	273	1.95%	2,192	15.68%	13,979
Franklin	6,141	67.46%	2,828	31.07%	134	1.47%	3,313	36.39%	9,103
Grant	5,911	73.97%	1,977	24.74%	103	1.29%	3,934	49.23%	7,991
Iberia	19,420	60.17%	12,426	38.50%	427	1.32%	6,994	21.67%	32,273
Iberville	6,333	42.71%	8,259	55.70%	235	1.58%	-1,926	-12.99%	14,827
Jackson	5,038	65.88%	2,525	33.02%	84	1.10%	2,513	32.86%	7,647
Jefferson	117,882	61.50%	72,136	37.64%	1,645	0.86%	45,746	23.86%	191,663
Jefferson Davis	8,055	61.93%	4,745	36.48%	207	1.59%	3,310	25.45%	13,007
Lafayette	57,732	64.20%	31,210	34.71%	981	1.09%	26,522	29.49%	89,923
Lafourche	22,734	60.04%	14,417	38.08%	713	1.88%	8,317	21.96%	37,864
LaSalle	5,015	80.39%	1,155	18.52%	68	1.09%	3,860	61.87%	6,238
Lincoln	10,791	59.23%	7,242	39.75%	185	1.02%	3,549	19.48%	18,218
Livingston	33,976	76.78%	9,895	22.36%	382	0.86%	24,081	54.42%	44,253
Madison	2,291	49.03%	2,334	49.95%	48	1.03%	-43	-0.92%	4,673
Morehouse	7,471	57.60%	5,336	41.14%	164	1.26%	2,135	16.46%	12,971
Natchitoches	9,261	54.59%	7,398	43.60%	307	1.81%	1,863	10.99%	16,966
Orleans	42,847	21.74%	152,610	77.43%	1,646	0.84%	-109,763	-55.69%	197,103
Ouachita	41,750	64.78%	22,016	34.16%	678	1.05%	19,734	30.62%	64,444
Plaquemines	7,866	64.72%	4,181	34.40%	106	0.87%	3,685	30.32%	12,153
Pointe Coupee	5,429	48.17%	5,712	50.68%	130	1.15%	-283	-2.51%	11,271
Rapides	34,492	63.79%	18,904	34.96%	673	1.24%	15,588	28.83%	54,069
Red River	2,507	53.15%	2,140	45.37%	70	1.48%	367	7.78%	4,717
Richland	5,471	63.14%	3,082	35.57%	112	1.29%	2,389	27.57%	8,665
Sabine	6,711	70.08%	2,743	28.64%	122	1.27%	3,968	41.44%	9,576
St. Bernard	19,597	65.68%	9,956	33.37%	285	0.96%	9,641	32.31%	29,838
St. Charles	14,747	61.87%	8,856	37.15%	234	0.98%	5,891	24.72%	23,837
St. Helena	2,235	40.58%	3,173	57.61%	100	1.82%	-938	-17.03%	5,508
St. James	4,545	40.92%	6,407	57.68%	156	1.40%	-1,862	-16.76%	11,108
St. John the Baptist	9,039	46.08%	10,305	52.53%	273	1.39%	-1,266	-6.45%	19,617
St. Landry	18,315	49.82%	18,166	49.42%	279	0.76%	149	0.40%	36,760
St. Martin	12,095	52.99%	10,321	45.22%	408	1.79%	1,774	7.77%	22,824
St. Mary	12,877	56.74%	9,547	42.07%	270	1.19%	3,330	14.67%	22,694
St. Tammany	75,139	74.70%	24,665	24.52%	788	0.78%	50,474	50.18%	100,592
Tangipahoa	26,181	62.14%	15,345	36.42%	609	1.45%	10,836	25.72%	42,135
Tensas	1,453	49.04%	1,469	49.58%	41	1.38%	-16	-0.54%	2,963
Terrebonne	26,358	64.96%	13,684	33.73%	532	1.31%	12,674	31.23%	40,574
Union	7,457	69.57%	3,089	28.82%	172	1.60%	4,368	40.75%	10,718
Vermilion	15,069	61.38%	9,085	37.00%	398	1.62%	5,984	24.38%	24,552
Vernon	11,032	72.44%	4,035	26.50%	162	1.06%	6,997	45.94%	15,229
Washington	11,006	61.69%	6,554	36.74%	281	1.58%	4,452	24.95%	17,841
Webster	11,070	60.00%	6,833	37.04%	546	2.96%	4,237	22.96%	18,449
West Baton Rouge	5,822	53.73%	4,932	45.52%	81	0.75%	890	8.21%	10,835
West Carroll	3,740	74.31%	1,231	24.46%	62	1.23%	2,509	49.85%	5,033
West Feliciana	2,932	56.19%	2,214	42.43%	72	1.38%	718	13.76%	5,218
Winn	4,366	67.10%	2,056	31.60%	85	1.31%	2,310	35.50%	6,507
Totals	1,102,169	56.72%	820,299	42.22%	20,638	1.06%	281,870	14.50%	1,943,106

==== Parishes that flipped Democratic to Republican ====
- Bienville (Largest city: Arcadia)
- Caddo (Largest city: Shreveport)
- St. Landry (Largest city: Opelousas)
- West Baton Rouge (Largest city: Port Allen)

=== By congressional district ===
Bush won six of seven congressional districts, including one held by a Democrat.

District	Bush	Kerry	Representative
1st	70%	29%	David Vitter
1st	70%	29%	Bobby Jindal
2nd	24%	75%	William J. Jefferson
3rd	58%	41%	Billy Tauzin
3rd	58%	41%	Charlie Melancon
4th	59%	40%	Jim McCrery
5th	62%	37%	Rodney Alexander
6th	59%	40%	Richard H. Baker
7th	60%	39%	Chris John
7th	60%	39%	Charles Boustany

== Electors ==
Technically the voters of Louisiana cast their ballots for electors: representatives to the Electoral College. Louisiana is allocated nine electors because it has seven congressional districts and two senators. All candidates who appear on the ballot or qualify to receive write-in votes must submit a list of nine electors, who pledge to vote for their candidate and their running mate. Whoever wins the majority of votes in the state is awarded all nine electoral votes. Their chosen electors then vote for president and vice president. Although electors are pledged to their candidate and running mate, they are not obligated to vote for them. An elector who votes for someone other than their candidate is known as a faithless elector.

The electors of each state and the District of Columbia met on December 13, 2004, to cast their votes for president and vice president. The Electoral College itself never meets as one body. Instead the electors from each state and the District of Columbia met in their respective capitols.

The following were the members of the Electoral College from the state. All nine were pledged to Bush/Cheney:

1. Tom Angers
2. Michael Bayham
3. David R. Carroll
4. Archie Corder
5. Floyd Gonzalez
6. Gerald Hebert
7. John H. Musser
8. Sal Palmisano
9. Ruth L. Ulrich

== See also ==
- United States presidential elections in Louisiana
- Presidency of George W. Bush
