= 2004 Louisiana Democratic presidential primary =

- March 9, 2004

72 Democratic National Convention delegates (60 pledged, 12 unpledged) The number of pledged delegates received is determined by the popular vote
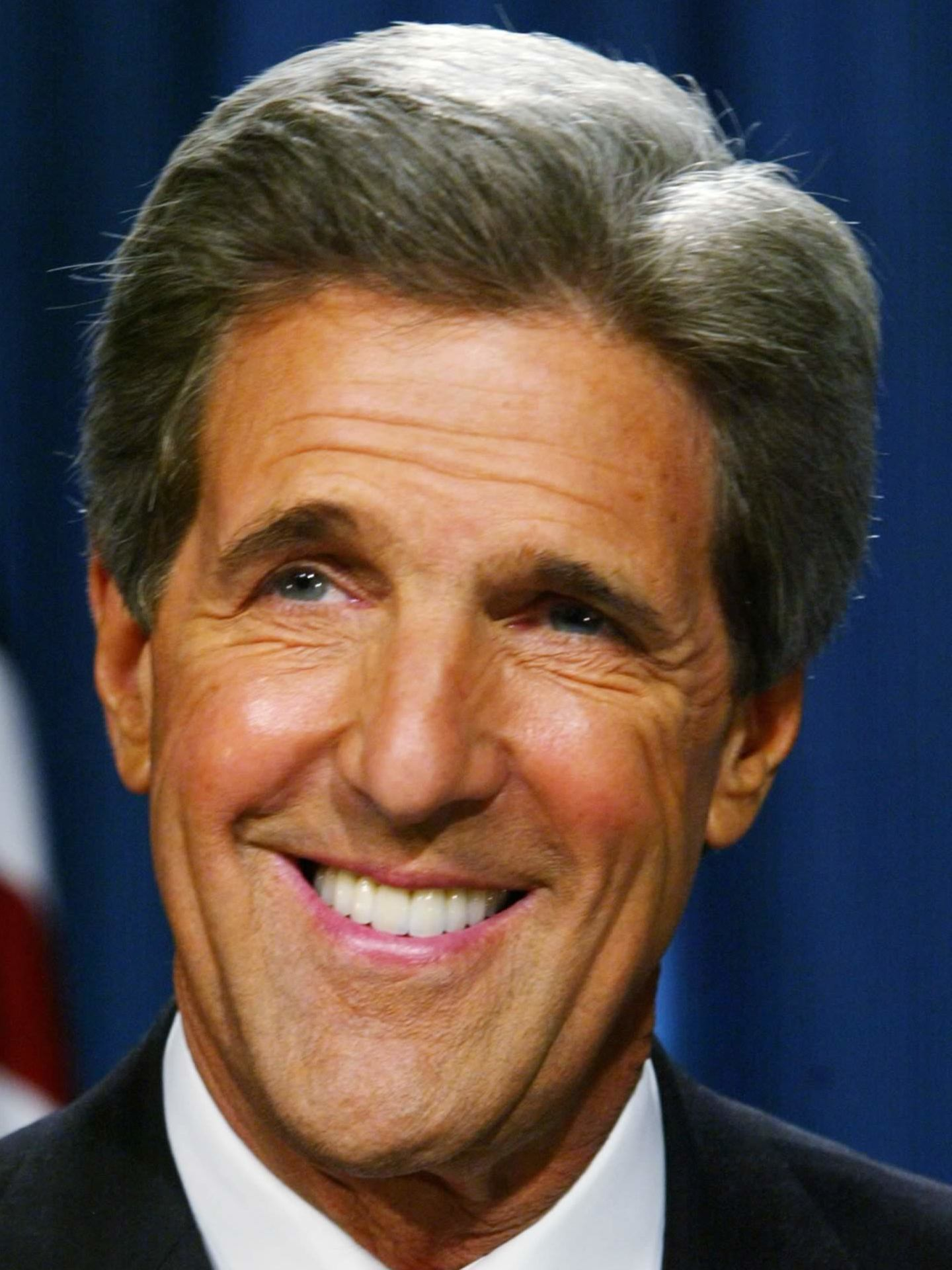

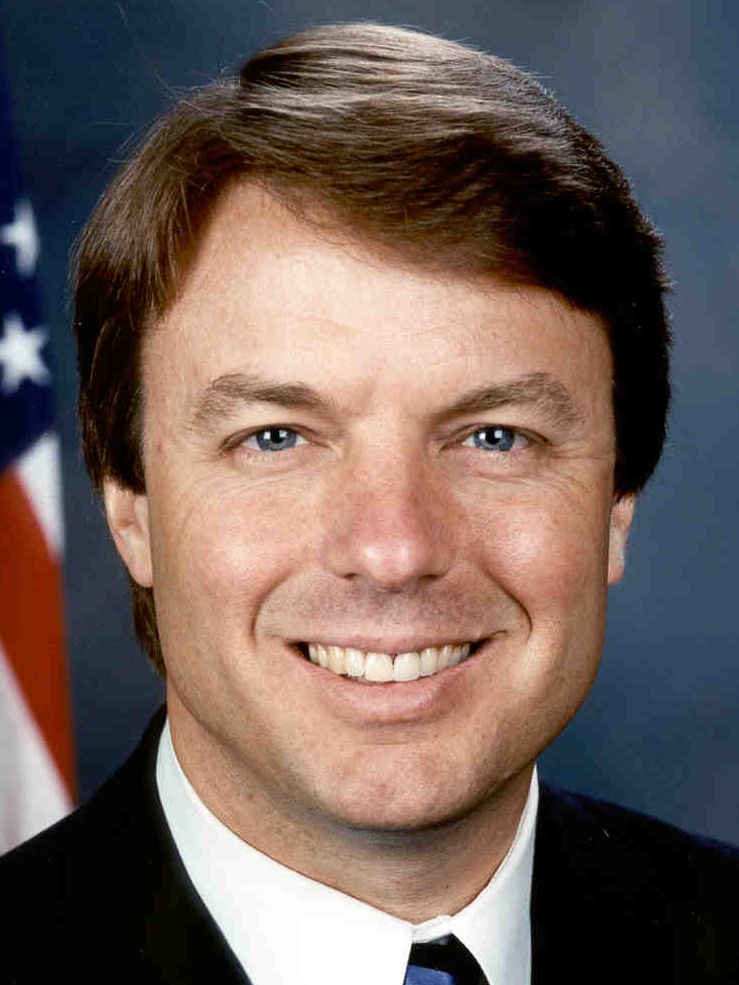
Candidate	John Kerry	John Edwards (withdrawn)
Home state	Massachusetts	North Carolina
Delegate count	50	10
Popular vote	112,639	26,074
Percentage	69.68%	16.13%
- Parish results Kerry: 55–60% 60–65% 65–70% 70–75% 75–80%

The 2004 Louisiana Democratic presidential primary was held on March 9 in the U.S. state of Louisiana as one of the Democratic Party's statewide nomination contests ahead of the 2004 presidential election.

== Results ==
2004 Louisiana Democratic presidential primary
Candidate	Votes	%	Delegates
John Kerry	112,639	69.68	50
John Edwards (withdrawn)	26,074	16.13	10
Howard Dean (withdrawn)	7,948	4.92	0
Wesley Clark (withdrawn)	7,091	4.39	0
Bill McGaughey	3,161	1.96	0
Dennis Kucinich	2,411	1.49	0
Lyndon LaRouche	2,329	1.44	0
Total	161,653	100%	60

== See also ==
- 2004 Louisiana Republican presidential primary
- 2004 Democratic Party presidential primaries
- 2004 United States presidential election in Louisiana
