= Jack Fellure =

American politician (1931–2022)

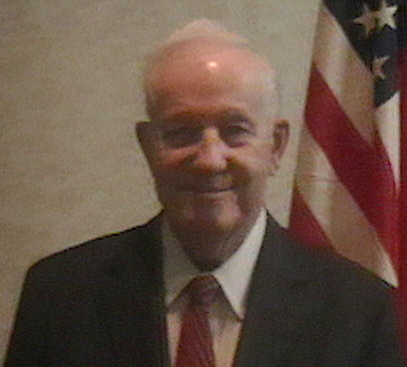
- Fellure in 2011

Personal details
- Born: Lowell Jackson Fellure; October 3, 1931 Midkiff, West Virginia, U.S.
- Died: July 31, 2022 (aged 90) Huntington, West Virginia, U.S.
- Party: Republican (before 2011, 2012–2022) Prohibition (2011–2012)
- Spouse: Jean
- Children: 7
- Occupation: Perennial candidate Retired engineer
- Known for: Prohibition Party presidential nominee, 2012
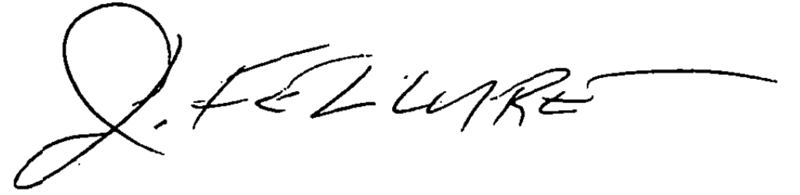
- Signature

Lowell Jackson Fellure (October 3, 1931 – July 31, 2022) was an American political candidate and engineer. He was the presidential nominee of the Prohibition Party for the 2012 presidential election.

== Early life and career ==
Fellure was born in Midkiff, West Virginia, in 1931, to Ellis Elwin and Bessie Jean Fellure. He attended grade school in nearby Salt Rock, graduating from Barboursville High School in 1949. Fellure then enrolled at Marshall College (now Marshall University), and upon graduation became a teacher.

In his professional life, Fellure worked a variety of jobs, culminating in a position as a field engineer for General Electric, from which he retired in 1991. He served as a minister to a wide range of churches.

== Campaigns ==
Fellure formally campaigned for President of the United States in every presidential election from 1988 to 2020 as a member of the Republican Party. He asserted on his campaign web site that his platform based on the King James Version of the Bible never changed. As a candidate, he called for the elimination of the liquor industry, abortion, and pornography, and advocated prayer in public schools and criminalization of homosexuality. He blamed the ills of society on those he characterized as "atheists, Marxists, liberals, queers, liars, draft dodgers, flag burners, dope addicts, sex perverts and anti-Christians."

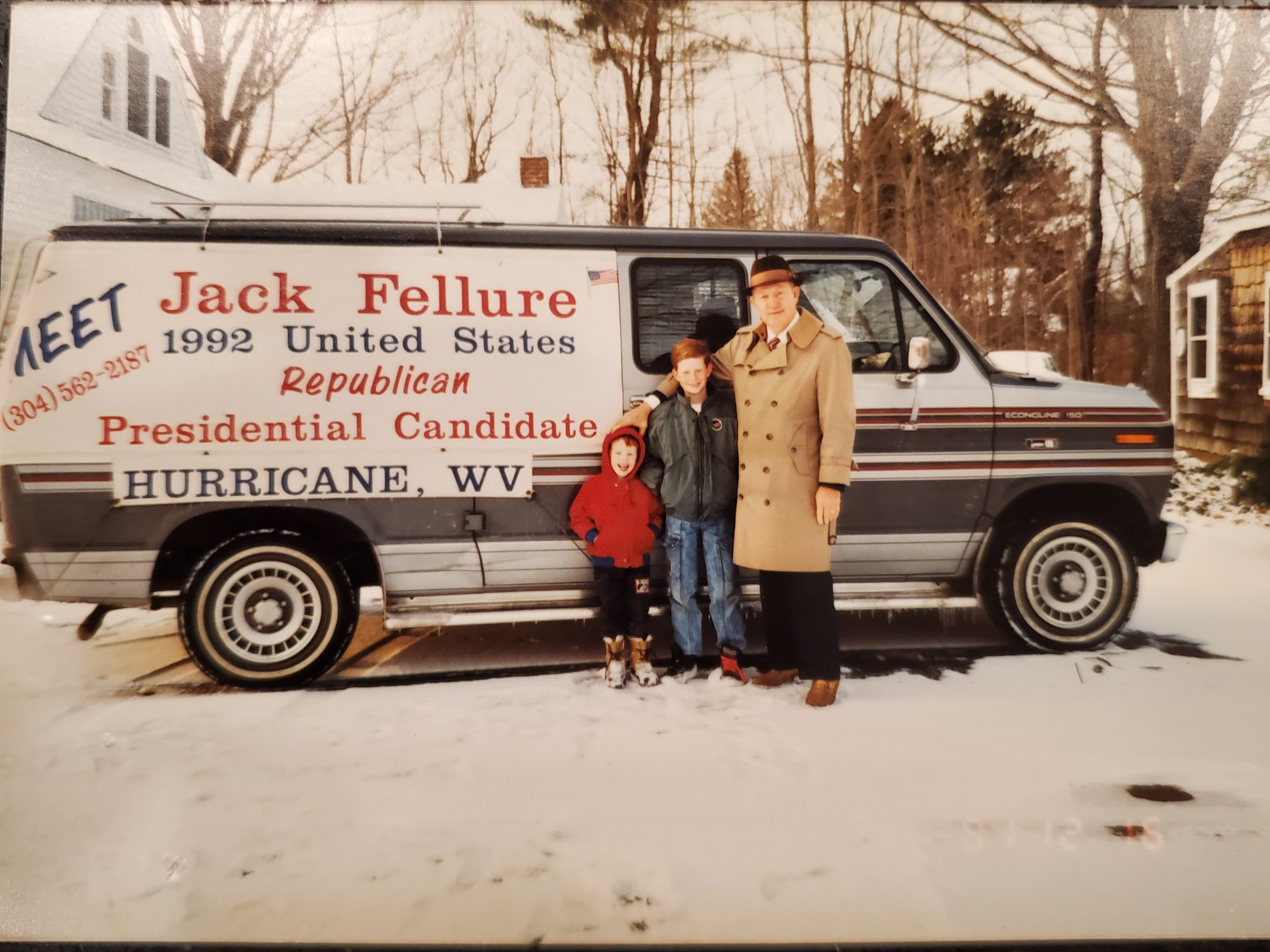
Jack Fellure meets with local supporters during a 1992 campaign stop in New Hampshire

In 1992, Fellure filed to run in the New Hampshire, West Virginia and Kansas Republican primaries. By November 1991, he had spent $40,000 of his own money on the campaign, and he sent a King James Bible to the Federal Election Commission as a copy of his platform. Regarding the 1611 English version of the Bible, he said:

God wrote it as the supreme document and final authority in the affairs of all men, nations and civilizations, for time and eternity ... It shall never be necessary to change it.

Fellure received 36 votes in the New Hampshire primary and complained that President George H. W. Bush and commentator Pat Buchanan were receiving all the media attention.

During the 1996 presidential election while running for the Republican Party presidential nomination, he criticized former president George H. W. Bush as a man "responsible for inestimable damage toward the destruction of this sovereign democratic constitutional republic [who] continued to water the seeds of international, Satanic Marxism to the exclusion of our national sovereignty". He added that President Bill Clinton "merely shifted into overdrive the socialistic, Marxist New World Order agenda." He appeared on the primary ballot in Puerto Rico and received 34 votes (0.01%). In the general election, Fellure received one write-in vote in Idaho.

Fellure again filed to run for president in 2000, but did not appear on any primary ballots. In 2004, he challenged incumbent President George W. Bush for the Republican Party nomination. Fellure was the only candidate to appear alongside Bush in the North Dakota caucus, as he met the Federal Election Commission requirement of $5,000 in receipts. He received 14 of the 2,020 votes cast (about 0.7%), and lost all 26 delegates to Bush.

=== 2012 campaign ===
After another run in 2008, Fellure initially ran for the Republican Party's 2012 presidential nomination.

After failing to gain attention for his 2012 presidential campaign as a Republican, Fellure decided to seek the nomination of the Prohibition Party at the party's national convention in Cullman, Alabama. Fellure was nominated for president on the second ballot, beating out former Thompson Township tax assessor and longtime Prohibition Party activist James Hedges of Pennsylvania. Party chairman Toby Davis was named as his running mate. The ticket appeared on the ballot only in Louisiana and received 518 votes on Election Day.

=== Return to Republican Party ===
In November 2012, Fellure filed with the FEC to run for the Republican Party's 2016 presidential nomination. He was unsuccessful. In November 2016, Fellure filed to run for the party's 2020 presidential nomination, but failed to make the ballot in any state.

In a 2021 interview, Fellure reflected on his many campaigns, and remarked, "I found that people either readily accept or totally reject the Word of God. There seems to be no middle ground."

== Personal life ==
Fellure resided in Hurricane, West Virginia, with his wife Jean, and was the father of seven children. They attended an Independent Fundamental Baptist church in Hurricane. Fellure was also a Kentucky Colonel.

On July 31, 2022, Fellure died at St. Mary’s Medical Center in Huntington, West Virginia, at the age of 90.

== See also ==
- Christian views on alcohol
- Dominion Theology
- King James Only movement
- Radical Right
- Perennial candidate
- Protestant fundamentalism

Party political offices
| Preceded by Gene Amondson | Prohibition Party presidential nominee 2012 | Succeeded by James Hedges |
