= Gene Amondson =

American painter and politician

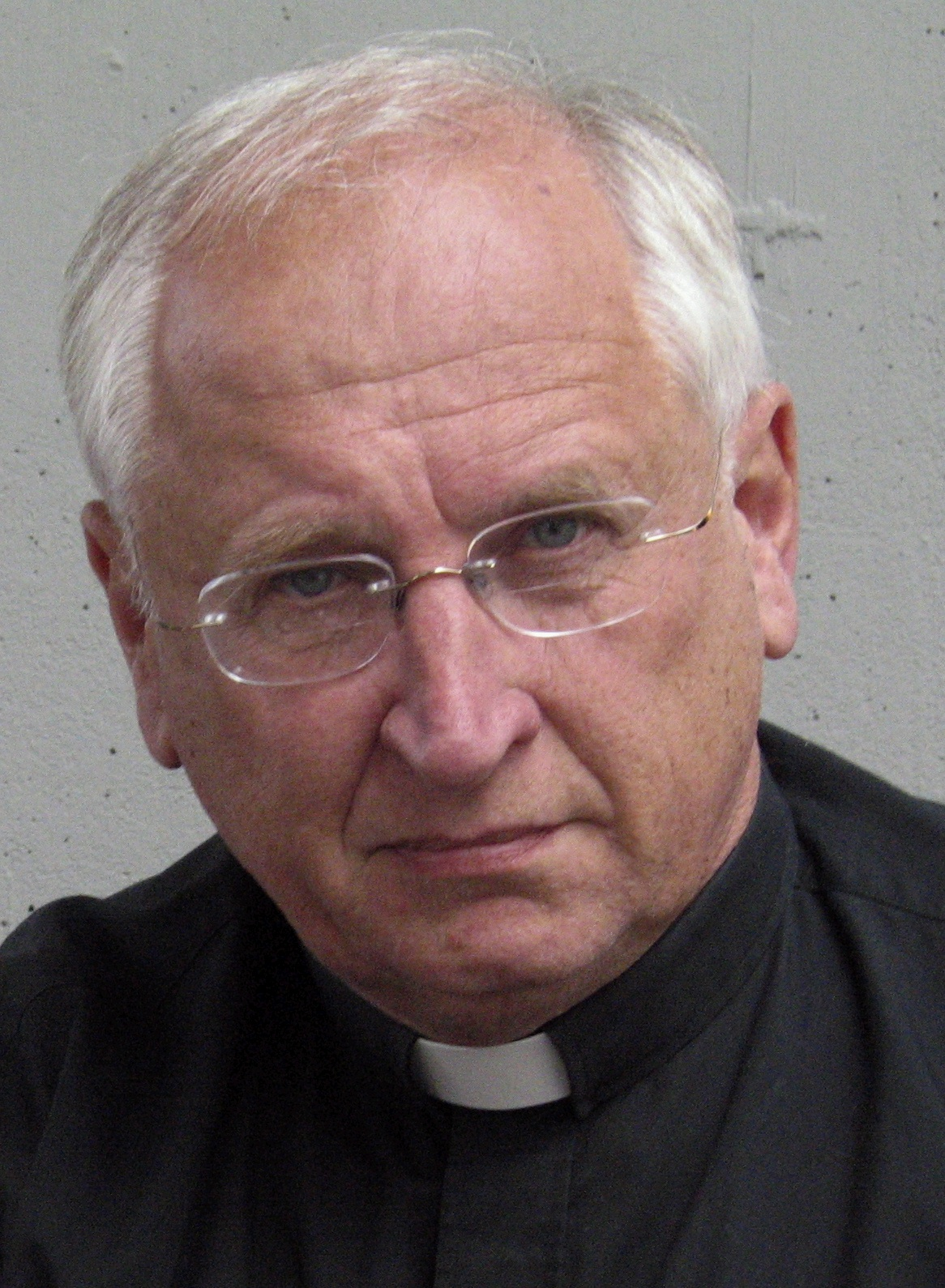
- Born: October 15, 1943; Morton, Washington, U.S.
- Died: July 20, 2009 (aged 65); Seattle, Washington, U.S.
- Education: Warner Pacific College (BS); Asbury Theological Seminary
- Occupations: Artist, minister, activist
- Political party: Prohibition
- Children: 5

Gene C. Amondson (October 15, 1943 – July 20, 2009) was an American Christian minister and prohibition activist, who was the 2004 US presidential nominee for one faction of the Prohibition Party and the nominee of the unified party in 2008.

The son of a logger, Amondson was born into a Pacific Northwest. He became interested in the temperance movement while attending Divinity School. After establishing himself as a preacher and artist in the community of Vashon Island, Washington, Amondson began touring the nation reenacting Billy Sunday sermons and attending events dressed as the Grim Reaper to protest alcohol corporations.

Amondson's activism attracted notice from the Prohibition Party, which had been divided into two factions in 2003. In 2004, Amondson received the presidential nomination of the larger faction. On Election Day, he tallied over a thousand votes and finished in third place in several Louisiana parishes. With the death of the other faction leader in 2007, the party reunified. In 2008, Amondson again received the party's presidential nomination, but fell short of his 2004 vote total.

== Early life ==
Gene Amondson was born to Owen and Ruby Amondson in Morton, Washington near the city of Centralia. His mother was a German American homemaker, originally from Nebraska and his father, who was nicknamed "Red", was a Norwegian American> logger. As a child, neither of Gene's parents drank, but he saw drunken logger fights and attended school with children neglected by alcoholic parents. In addition, he remembered witnessing a drunk logger molest a classmate when Amondson was five years old.

Amondson was also exposed to politics. His uncle, Orville "Porky" Amondson was elected and served as sheriff in Lewis County, and his brother Neil served in the Washington State Senate as a Republican.

Amondson attended Warner Pacific College in Portland, Oregon, and graduated with a Bachelor of Science degree in zoology. In college, he occasionally drank wine. His anti-alcohol views did not take root until he attended Asbury Theological Seminary in Kentucky in 1966, and learned about temperance leader and preacher Billy Sunday. Amondson estimated that after divinity school, he drank beer about twice a year. In the 1970s, he moved to the liberal community of Vashon Island, Washington, where he began preaching at Cove Road Church.

== Activism ==
After moving to Vashon Island, Amondson grew closer to the temperance movement. He started touring the nation reenacting the Billy Sunday sermons Get on the Water Wagon,Booze. and The Sermon Against Alcohol. He visited churches, prisons, schools, and Alcoholics Anonymous meetings to spread the message of temperance. In addition, he traveled to New Zealand on a Women's Christian Temperance Union-financed trip, and toured Africa.

I'm going to fight booze until hell freezes over, and then I'm going to buy a pair of ice skates and fight it some more.

— Gene Amondson

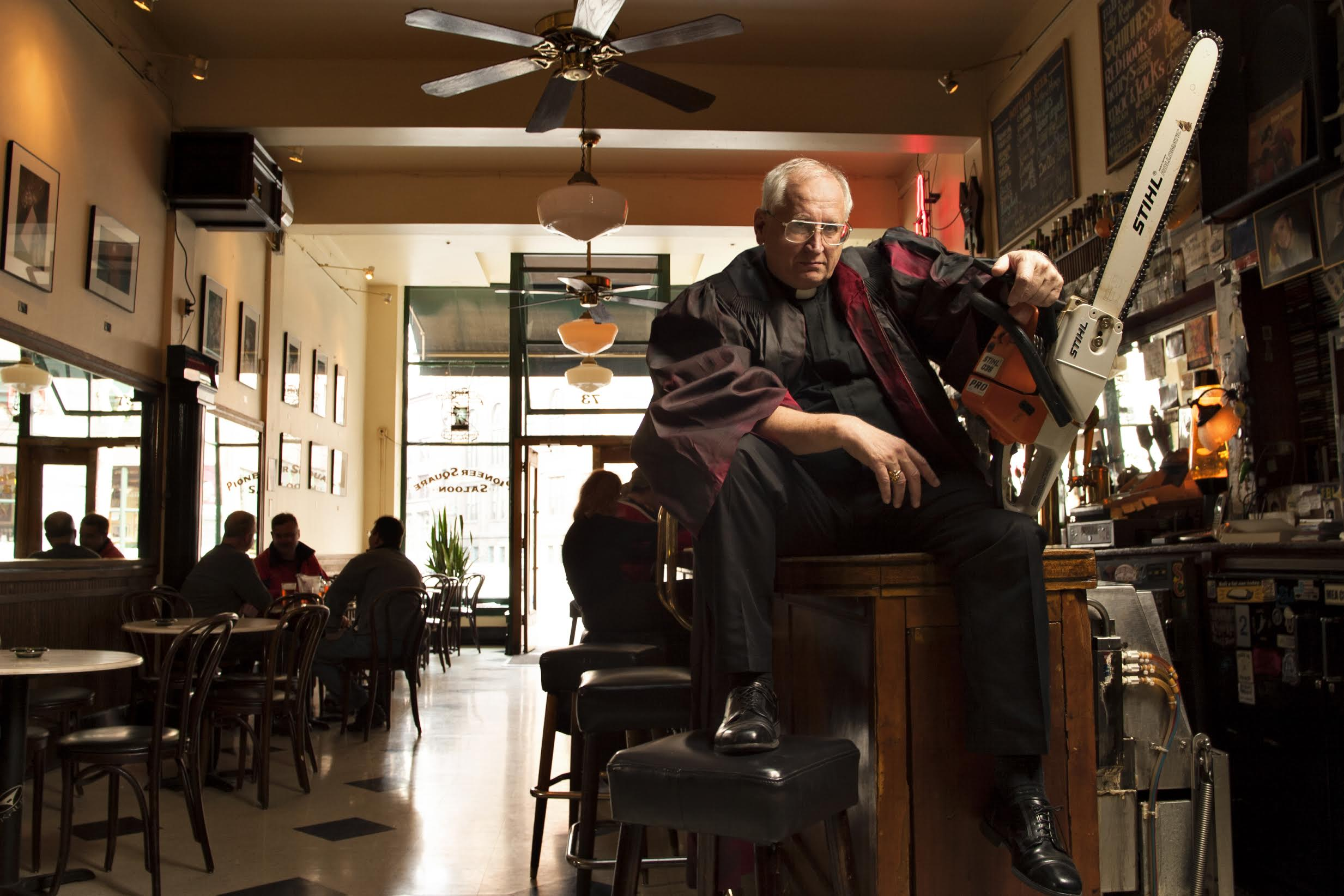
Amondson wields a chainsaw in allusion to Carrie Nation's hatchet.

In protest of alcohol, Amondson often stood outside liquor establishments dressed as the Grim Reaper. He once stood outside a courtroom as the figure after a couple sued Jim Beam claiming its product caused their son to be born intellectually disabled. During a 1989 interview, Amondson explained that he did not protest the individuals that drank, but the large corporations that distributed liquor. In 2005, he led a movement to stop the Washington legislature from allowing alcohol to be sold on Sundays, but was unsuccessful. Because of the passage, Amondson predicted "a lot more alcohol will be sold, [and] a few more children will suffer."

On Vashon Island, Amondson provided low rent housing for people with low income. He appeared in court a few times for zoning difficulties relating to the housing complexes but received legal aid from the Interfaith Council on Homelessness. Amondson was known to drive around Vashon Island in a Honda Civic accessorized with a fake elk head on the front and a license plate that read "Vote Dry." The car was also decorated with homemade bumper stickers that read "Dumb People Drink" and "Your Kids Need You Sober." While driving past taverns, he regularly honked the car horn twice in protest. In 2008, the car was installed with a hydrogen conversion kit that allowed it to be fueled by gasoline and water using electrolysis, significantly improving gas mileage. Amondson's car was one of the first in the nation to be fitted with such a kit.

== Presidential campaigns ==
=== 2004 ===
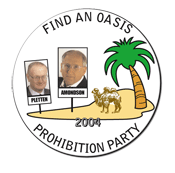
2004 campaign button.

In 2003, Amondson was approached by Thompson Township, Pennsylvania tax assessor James Hedges, the Prohibition Party's only elected official. He convinced Amondson to seek the nomination of his faction of the Prohibition Party, which split over perennial presidential nominee Earl Dodge's leadership of the party. Hedges' faction felt Dodge was more concerned with his campaign button business than advancing the party's goals. Dodge had run as the party's nominee in every election since 1984, but received only 208 votes in the 2000 election, down approximately 1,000 from the 1996 election. Amondson commenced his first presidential campaign with the nomination of Hedges' faction. Dodge received the other faction's nomination. According to Dodge, Amondson had previously contacted him about the vice presidential nomination, but it had already been filled. Dodge reasoned Amondson was "probably a very nice man ... [but] he may not have known exactly what he was getting into." Conversely, Amondson referred to Dodge as a "good man" with whom he shared the same message, but argued, "Dodge is just not getting the job done. He's too old. We need to send it to an earlier generation."

While speaking with the media during his campaign, Amondson voiced his anti-alcohol message and attempted to address concerns that prohibition increases crime. In an AP interview, he explained that during Prohibition, "the budget was balanced, prisons were emptied, mental institutions emptied and cirrhosis of the liver declined." He concluded, "I'd rather have 100 Al Capones in every city than alcohol sold in every grocery store." Amondson made an appearance on The Daily Show with comedian Jon Stewart. He spoke with correspondent Ed Helms who joked with the candidate. During the segment, Amondson remarked, "alcohol cuts the supply of oxygen to the brain and puts you in a kind of retarded state." A short clip followed that showed Amondson in his Grim Reaper attire. Earl Dodge also appeared on the show in a separate interview with Helms.

The race between Amondson and Dodge was viewed as a way to determine which faction would lead the party in the future. Amondson achieved ballot access in Louisiana as the nominee of the Prohibition Party and in Colorado as the nominee of the Concerns of People Party. Dodge achieved ballot access only in Colorado, where he was listed as the nominee of the Prohibition Party. Overall, Amondson won the contest, collecting 1,896 (1,512 of those were from Louisiana) votes compared to Dodge's 140. As expected, Amondson placed well behind both major candidates (George W. Bush received 1.1 million votes, and John Kerry received over 1 million votes). He placed eighth in a slate of 12 candidates on Colorado's ballot (Dodge placed last, even though it was his home state). Amondson's third-place finish in four Louisiana parishes was the first time since 1960 that the Prohibition Party nominee for President out polled-all other third party candidates for president in any county.

=== 2008 ===
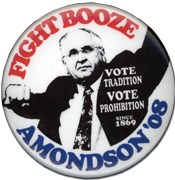
2008 campaign button.

Amondson was nominated for President at the 2008 Prohibition Party National Convention in Indianapolis. About 10 to 15 people attended the event. Earl Dodge died late in 2007, which reunified the split party. Similar to 2004, Amondson's based his campaign on media interviews. He spoke with Wikinews in June 2008, admitting that third party candidates such as himself have no chance of winning elections. Instead, he remarked, they "say wise things." When given a choice, Amondson favored the election of a Republican over a Democrat because of the policies on Israel and the ideological difference in justices nominated to the Supreme Court. Amondson wanted former Speaker of the House Newt Gingrich as his running mate, but the designation went to activist Leroy Pletten.

During the summer, Amondson campaigned in Louisiana and walked Bourbon Street dressed as the Grim Reaper in protest of alcohol. While in New Orleans, he filmed a documentary with his three sons. In interviews, Amondson took stands on issues other than alcohol. He declared support for the War in Iraq and tougher immigration laws, and advocated limits on divorce, an increased role of religion in schools and a decrease in government welfare programs. In an August interview with Weekend America, he explained his platform, "[w]e want to have protected borders and keep our gun rights and a lot of conservative things, but the main thing is help America realize that 95 percent of violent crime is connected with alcohol."

After John McCain selected Alaska Governor Sarah Palin to be his running mate, Amondson complimented the Republican for picking a "beautiful woman." Despite his own campaign, Amondson effectively endorsed McCain, revealing he would probably vote for McCain. Amondson attained ballot access in Colorado, Louisiana and Florida by Election Day, and received a total of 653 votes overall.

== Personal life ==
Amondson described himself as a "red-neck, Bible-thumbing preacher." He was married for 23 years and had four sons and one daughter, before divorcing. One of his sons died in infancy, and his remaining four children became involved in the motion picture industry upon adulthood.

Amondson appeared as a guest on The Oprah Winfrey Show in 1993 after writing a letter to the show expressing his interest in the 40,000 single women who entered a contest hoping to win a date with five widowers from Seattle. In the letter, which left Oprah staffers "quite interested" and "surprised," Amondson explained he was lonely and wanted someone "willing to work to help pay the taxes ... and my child support." On the show, he discussed his artwork, and was later invited for a second appearance. According to Amondson, following the appearance, he received hundreds of letters.

In his later years, Amondson split his time between Vashon Island and Alaska, where he hunted and found landscapes to paint. He cited painters John Singer Sargent and Joaquín Sorolla as his artistic influences. In addition, Amondson took an interest in woodcarving. His life-sized works can be found throughout Vashon Island. Along with painting and woodcarving, Amondson was an avid pie baker and published a book compiling his mother's pie recipes.

=== Death ===
On July 18, 2009, Amondson, who had previously been diagnosed with hypertension, suffered a stroke which caused him to fall into a coma. He died two days later at Harborview Medical Center in Seattle, aged 65. He was survived by his mother, his two brothers, his sister and four children. His funeral took place July 25 at the Bethel Evangelical Free Church in Vashon Island.

== See also ==
- List of candidates in the United States presidential election, 2004
- List of candidates in the United States presidential election, 2008

Party political offices
Preceded by Earl F. Dodge	Prohibition Party Presidential candidate 2004, 2008	Succeeded by Jack Fellure
