= 2004 Wisconsin Republican presidential primary =

- February 17, 2004

37 delegate to the 2004 Republican National Convention

Candidate	George W. Bush	Uncommitted
Home state	Texas	–
Delegate count	37	0
Popular vote	158,677	1,207
Percentage	99.2%	0.8%

Official photograph portrait of former U.S. President George W. Bush.

The 2004 Wisconsin Republican presidential primary was held on February 17, 2004, as part of the 2004 Republican Party primaries for the 2004 presidential election. 37 delegates to the 2004 Republican National Convention were allocated to presidential candidates.

President George W. Bush won easily by receiving all the delegate votes because most of his opponents were not on the ballot, except for his only opponent in the state of Wisconsin, Uncommitted.

== Candidates ==
President George W. Bush was the only person on the ballot, but there were still one of his opponents, Uncommitted, even though this was just a voting option.

- President George W. Bush
- Uncommitted (voting option)

== Results ==
President George W. Bush received 158,677 popular votes (99.2%) and 37 delegates, breaking North Dakota's results record (99.1%) before, Uncommitted received 1,207 popular votes (0.8%) in the race. Total votes were 159,884 popular votes. President Bush continued to win.

Results

Wisconsin Republican primary, February 17, 2004
Candidate	Votes	Percentage	Actual delegate count		
Candidate	Votes	Percentage	Bound	Unbound	Total
George W. Bush	158,677	99,2%	37		37
Uncommitted (voting option)	1,207	0.8%			
Total:	159,884	100.00%	37		37

== See also ==
- 2004 Republican Party presidential primaries
- 2004 Democratic Party presidential primaries
- 2004 United States presidential election
- 2004 United States presidential election in Wisconsin
- 2004 Wisconsin Democratic presidential primary
