= 2004 Louisiana Republican presidential primary =

- March 9, 2004

45 pledged delegates to the 2004 Republican National Convention

Candidate	George W. Bush	Bill Wyatt
Home state	Texas	California
Delegate count	45	0
Popular vote	69,205	2,805
Percentage	96.10%	3.90%
- Parish results Bush: 90–95% 95–100%

The 2004 Louisiana Republican presidential primary was held on March 9 in the U.S. state of Louisiana as one of the Republican Party's statewide nomination contests ahead of the 2004 presidential election.

== Results ==
2004 Louisiana Republican presidential primary
Candidate	Votes	%	Delegates
George W. Bush (incumbent)	69,205	96.10	45
Bill Wyatt	2,805	3.90	0
Total	72,010	100%	45

=== Results by county ===
2004 Louisiana Republican presidential primary (results by county)
Parish	George W. Bush		Bill Wyatt		Total votes cast
Parish	Votes	%	Votes	%	Total votes cast
Acadia	467	95.70%	21	4.30%	488
Allen	126	95.45%	6	4.55%	132
Ascension	2,492	97.15%	73	2.85%	2,565
Assumption	83	97.65%	2	2.35%	85
Avoyelles	194	98.48%	3	1.52%	197
Beauregard	351	96.69%	12	3.31%	363
Bienville	169	98.83%	2	1.17%	171
Bossier	569	95.95%	24	4.05%	593
Caddo	3,788	96.31%	145	3.69%	3,933
Calcasieu	2,323	97.12%	69	2.88%	2,392
Caldwell	206	94.50%	12	5.50%	218
Cameron	71	97.26%	2	2.74%	73
Catahoula	235	95.53%	11	4.47%	246
Claiborne	111	95.69%	5	4.31%	116
Concordia	771	97.72%	18	2.28%	789
DeSoto	211	97.24%	6	2.76%	217
East Baton Rouge	4,384	96.73%	148	3.27%	4,532
East Carroll	166	98.22%	3	1.78%	169
East Feliciana	314	97.21%	9	2.79%	323
Evangeline	128	92.75%	10	7.25%	138
Franklin	424	97.47%	11	2.53%	435
Grant	150	98.04%	3	1.96%	153
Iberia	662	98.07%	13	1.93%	675
Iberville	127	98.45%	2	1.55%	129
Jackson	398	96.84%	13	3.16%	411
Jefferson	11,550	95.82%	504	4.18%	12,054
Jefferson Davis	403	98.29%	7	1.71%	410
Lafayette	3,759	97.51%	96	2.49%	3,855
Lafourche	553	96.17%	22	3.83%	575
LaSalle	100	95.24%	5	4.76%	105
Lincoln	1,966	97.81%	44	2.19%	2,010
Livingston	653	95.89%	28	4.11%	681
Madison	185	96.86%	6	3.14%	191
Morehouse	163	95.88%	7	4.12%	170
Natchitoches	1,745	96.25%	68	3.75%	1,813
Orleans	5,463	92.12%	467	7.88%	5,930
Ouachita	4,339	97.37%	117	2.63%	4,456
Plaquemines	481	97.37%	13	2.63%	494
Pointe Coupee	331	97.64%	8	2.36%	339
Rapides	961	96.58%	34	3.42%	995
Red River	88	92.63%	7	7.37%	95
Richland	433	97.30%	12	2.70%	445
Sabine	229	95.42%	11	4.58%	240
St. Bernard	1,258	94.66%	71	5.34%	1,329
St. Charles	628	96.91%	20	3.09%	648
St. Helena	99	96.12%	4	3.88%	103
St. James	168	94.38%	10	5.62%	178
St. John The Baptist	166	93.79%	11	6.21%	177
St. Landry	498	94.50%	29	5.50%	527
St. Martin	258	95.20%	13	4.80%	271
St. Mary	564	98.43%	9	1.57%	573
St. Tammany	5,761	95.71%	258	4.29%	6,019
Tangipahoa	3,016	95.35%	147	4.65%	3,163
Tensas	49	92.45%	4	7.55%	53
Terrebonne	1,695	96.80%	56	3.20%	1,751
Union	306	98.08%	6	1.92%	312
Vermilion	197	96.10%	8	3.90%	205
Vernon	1,033	97.09%	31	2.91%	1,064
Washington	144	93.51%	10	6.49%	154
Webster	676	96.16%	27	3.84%	703
West Baton Rouge	107	97.27%	3	2.73%	110
West Carroll	106	95.50%	5	4.50%	111
West Feliciana	52	96.30%	2	3.70%	54
Winn	102	98.08%	2	1.92%	104
Total	69,205	96.10%	2,805	3.90%	72,010

== See also ==
- 2004 Louisiana Democratic presidential primary
- 2004 Republican Party presidential primaries
- 2004 United States presidential election in Louisiana
