= James Hedges =

American politician (1938–2024)

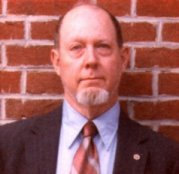

Tax Assessor for Thompson Township, Fulton County, Pennsylvania
- In office 2002–2007
- Preceded by: Vacant
- Succeeded by: Office abolished

Personal details
- Born: James Arthur Hedges; May 10, 1938 Iowa City, Iowa, U.S.
- Died: March 4, 2024 (aged 85) Hagerstown, Maryland, U.S.
- Party: Prohibition
- Spouse: Carolyn Dick
- Education: University of Iowa (B.A.); University of Maryland (M.A.)

Military service
- Allegiance: United States of America
- Branch/service: United States Marine Corps
- Unit: United States Marine Band

James Arthur Hedges (May 10, 1938 – March 4, 2024) was an American politician who served as the tax assessor for Thompson Township, Pennsylvania and as the Prohibition Party's 2016 presidential nominee. He was the only member of the Prohibition Party to be elected to public office in the 21st century, and the first since 1959.

== Early life ==
James Arthur Hedges was born in Iowa City, Iowa, on May 10, 1938, to Robert Hedges and Margaret Ayres. His parents were teetotalers for religious reasons. He became interested in the Prohibition Party while in high school after reading an article in a newspaper.

Hedges graduated from Citi High School in 1956, the University of Iowa with a bachelor's degree in music in 1960, and the University of Maryland with a master's degree in geography in 1972. He played the tuba in the United States Marine Band from 1960 to 1980. On June 16, 1990, he married Carolyn Dick in Hancock, Maryland. Hedges constructed his own house in Fulton County, Pennsylvania, and worked in the printing industry, including operating Camel Press.

== Career ==
From 1972 to 1983, Hedges served as the editor of the National Speleological Society Bulletin. He later became a reporter and environmental columnist for area weekly newspapers and was appointed Fulton County's first Recycling Coordinator.

In 1980, Hedges retired from the military and became more active in the Prohibition Party. In 2005, he was selected as the Secretary of the Partisan Prohibition Historical Society. Hedges also published the party's printed newsletter.

=== Tax assessor ===
In 2001, Hedges secured the nominations of the Republican and Democratic parties through a write-in campaign; thus, he appeared as the only candidate for Tax Assessor in Thompson Township. He became the first official elected in a partisan election from the Prohibition Party since two members of the Winona Lake, Indiana, city council were elected in 1959. Hedges was reelected in 2005, and served until the office was abolished by the Pennsylvania General Assembly in 2007.

=== 2004 presidential election ===
Prior to the 2004 presidential election, Hedges was involved in a schism within the party stemming from alleged misuse of funds and mismanagement by Earl Dodge, the party's longtime face. Notably, Hedges and others claimed that Dodge sold the party's headquarters for $119,500 in 1999 with intent to build on his own property, but that Dodge instead kept the money for himself and moved the headquarters to a tool shed. Dodge countered by saying that he placed the funds in a separate party account, and argued that Hedges and others who had put forth the allegations were simply disgruntled with their position in the party. Hedges and his faction formed the Concerns of the People Party to counter Dodge, and nominated Gene Amondson for president. Both Dodge and Hedges claimed their parties were the legitimate Prohibition Party. The split came to an end in 2007 after Dodge's death, and the reunified party again nominated Amondson for president for the 2008 election.

=== Presidential campaigns ===
Hedges announced on February 18, 2010, that he intended to run for the party's presidential nomination for the 2012 election. Hedges lost the nomination to retired engineer Jack Fellure at the national Convention in Cullman, Alabama, on June 22, 2011.

Hedges received the Prohibition presidential nomination for the 2016 election during a nominating convention held via conference call on July 31, 2015. Hedges was a contestant in the American Independent Party primary in California where received 10.56% and carried Lake County.

Hedges appeared on the ballot in Arkansas, Colorado, and Mississippi and received 5,617 votes. He was the first Prohibitionist presidential candidate to appear on the ballot in Mississippi since 1896. He had the best performance for a Prohibitionist presidential nominee since 1988 and placed third in Arkansas County, Arkansas.

== Later life and death ==
Hedges was selected as the party's secretary following the 2016 election. He died in Hagerstown, Maryland, on March 4, 2024, at the age of 85.

== Electoral history ==
2001 Thompson Township tax assessor election
Party	Candidate	Votes	%
Prohibition	James Hedges		
Democratic	James Hedges		
Republican	James Hedges		
Total	James Hedges	2	66.67%
Write-in		1	33.33%
Total votes		3	100.00%

2005 Thompson Township tax assessor election
Party	Candidate	Votes	%
Democratic	James Hedges		
Republican	James Hedges		
Total	James Hedges	1	50.00%
Write-in		1	50.00%
Total votes		2	100.00%

2016 American Independent Party presidential primary
Party	Candidate	Votes	%
American Independent	Alan Spears	8,103	19.18%
American Independent	Arthur Harris	7,216	17.08%
American Independent	Robert Ornelas	7,164	16.96%
American Independent	Wiley Drake	5,475	12.96%
American Independent	J. R. Myers	5,475	12.96%
American Independent	James Hedges	4,462	10.56%
American Independent	Tom Hoefling	4,345	10.29%
Total votes		42,240	100.00%

== Works cited ==
- Padilla, Alex, ed. (2016). June 7, 2016 Presidential Primary Election (PDF). Secretary of State of California.

Party political offices
Preceded by Jack Fellure	Prohibition Party presidential nominee 2016	Succeeded by Phil Collins
