= National Prohibition Foundation =

Coloradoan non-profit

The National Prohibition Foundation is a non-profit Colorado corporation established in 2001 and originally incorporated in Indiana in 1952. Its purpose is to receive and manage bequests and other donations for the benefit of the Prohibition Party.

The Foundation (not to be confused with the American Prohibition Foundation) is part of the organizational structure of the Prohibition party, other components of which are the Prohibition National Committee, the Partisan Prohibition Historical Society, the Prohibitionists Caucus, the Action!, and all state and local affiliates.

== Sources ==
- National Prohibition Party website
