= 2004 North Dakota Democratic presidential caucuses =

- February 3, 2004

22 Democratic National Convention delegates (14 pledged, 8 unpledged) The number of pledged delegates received is determined by the popular vote
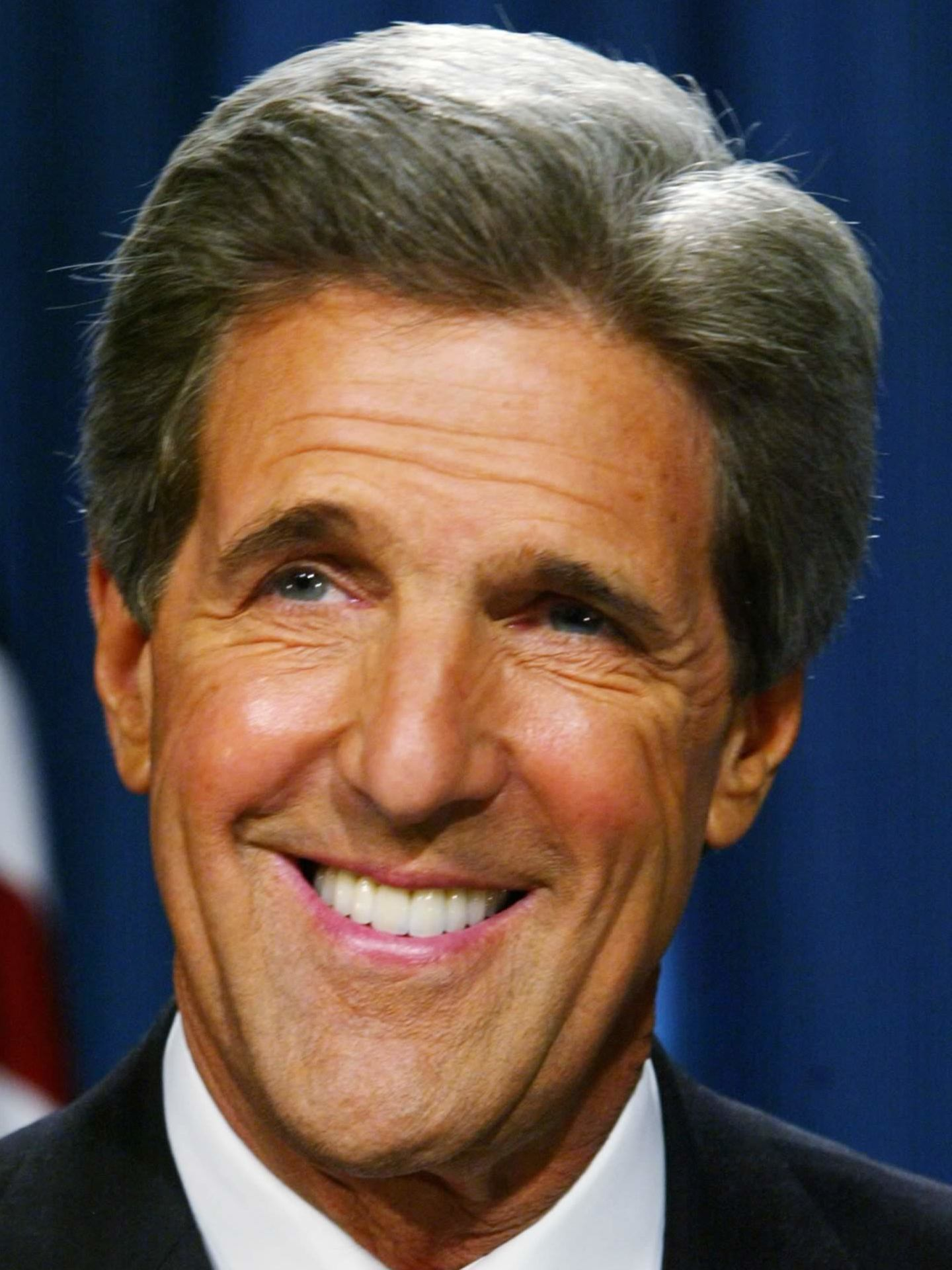

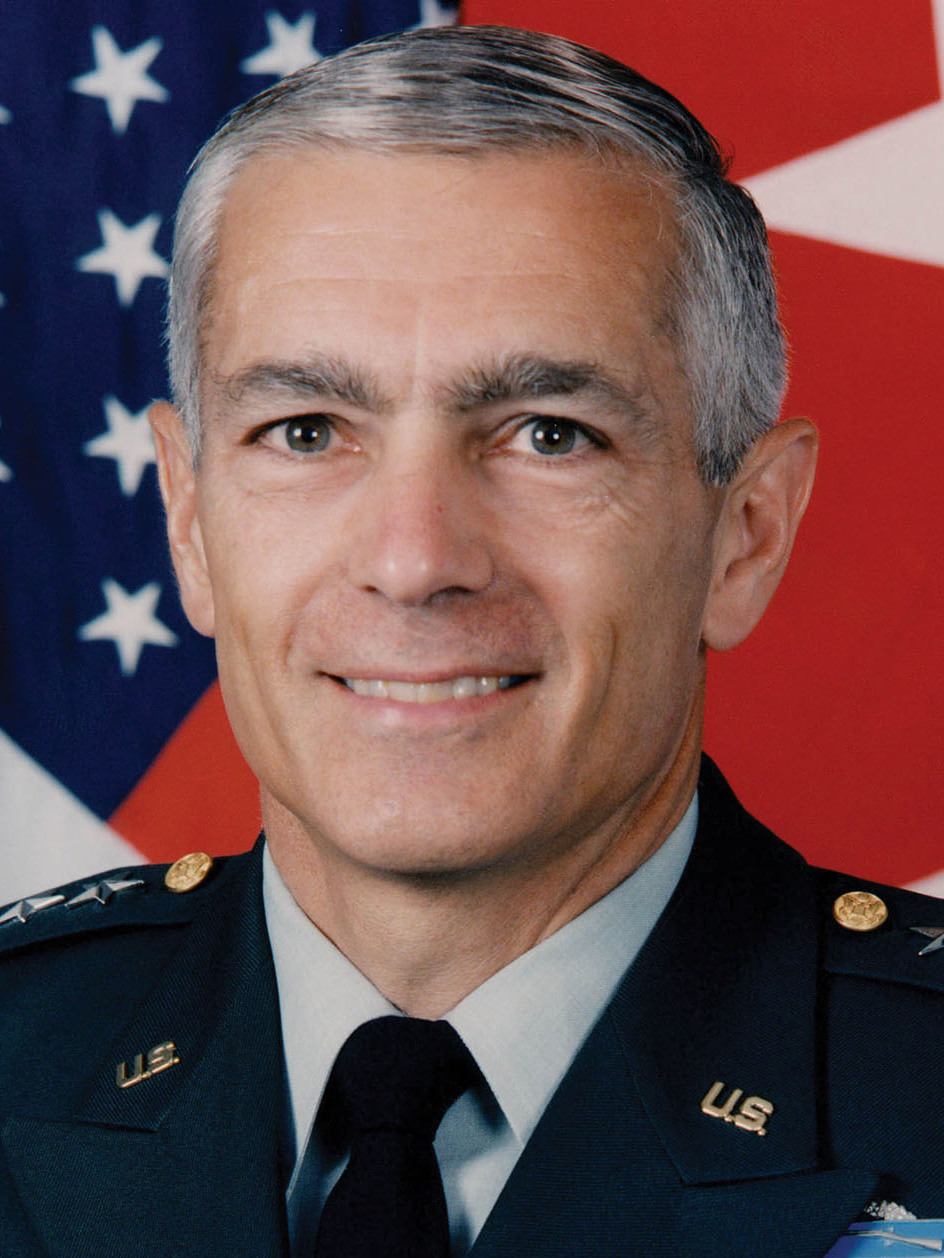

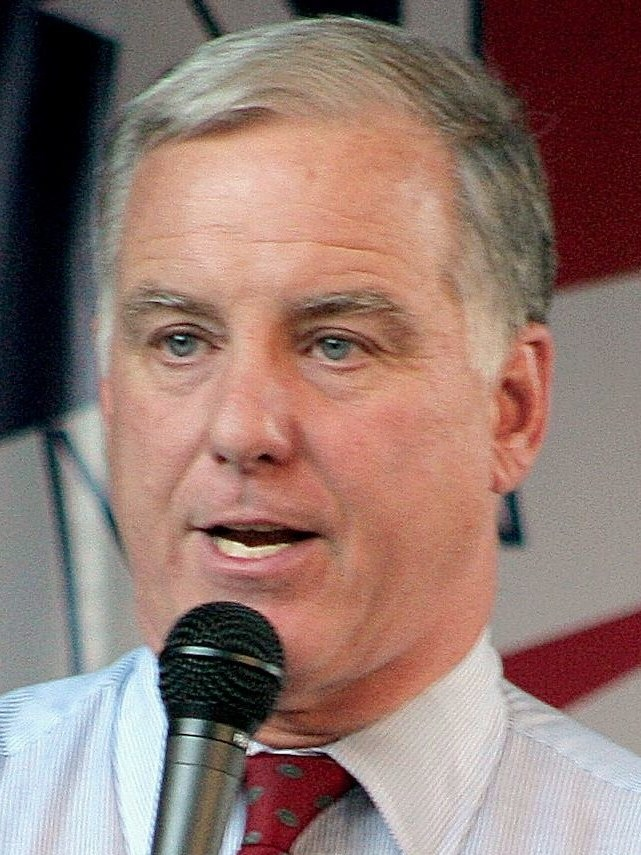

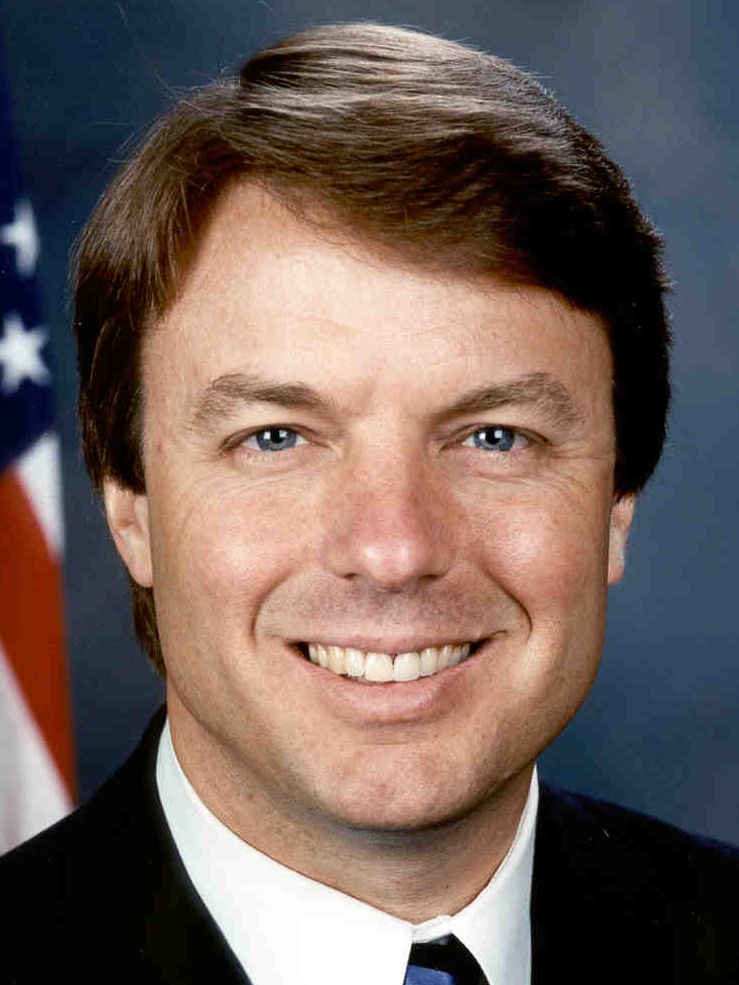
Candidate	John Kerry	Wesley Clark
Home state	Massachusetts	Arkansas
Delegate count	9	5
Popular vote	5,366	2,502
Percentage	50.82%	23.70%
Candidate	Howard Dean	John Edwards
Home state	Vermont	North Carolina
Delegate count	0	0
Popular vote	1,231	1,025
Percentage	11.66%	9.71%

The 2004 North Dakota Democratic presidential caucuses were held on February 3 along with six other states. Frontrunner John Kerry had earlier won New Mexico, Missouri, Arizona and Delaware by large margins. Army General Wesley Clark had hoped to win some primaries this day but got only second and third place finishes. Howard Dean just months earlier Dean had narrowly been leading in polls over Wesley Clark. The endorsements were former governor George A. Sinner who endorsed Wesley Clark. The results were Kerry with 51% to Wesley 24% and Dean at 12%.

== Results ==
2004 North Dakota Democratic presidential caucuses
Candidate	Votes	%	Delegates
John Kerry	5,366	50.82	9
Wesley Clark	2,502	23.70	5
Howard Dean	1,231	11.66	0
John Edwards	1,025	9.71	0
Dennis Kucinich	308	2.92	0
Joe Lieberman	98	0.93	0
Al Sharpton	28	0.27	0
Total	10,558	100%	14
