= Thompson Township, Fulton County, Pennsylvania =

Township in Pennsylvania, United States

Coordinates: 39°45′51″N 78°06′57″W

Thompson Township
- Township
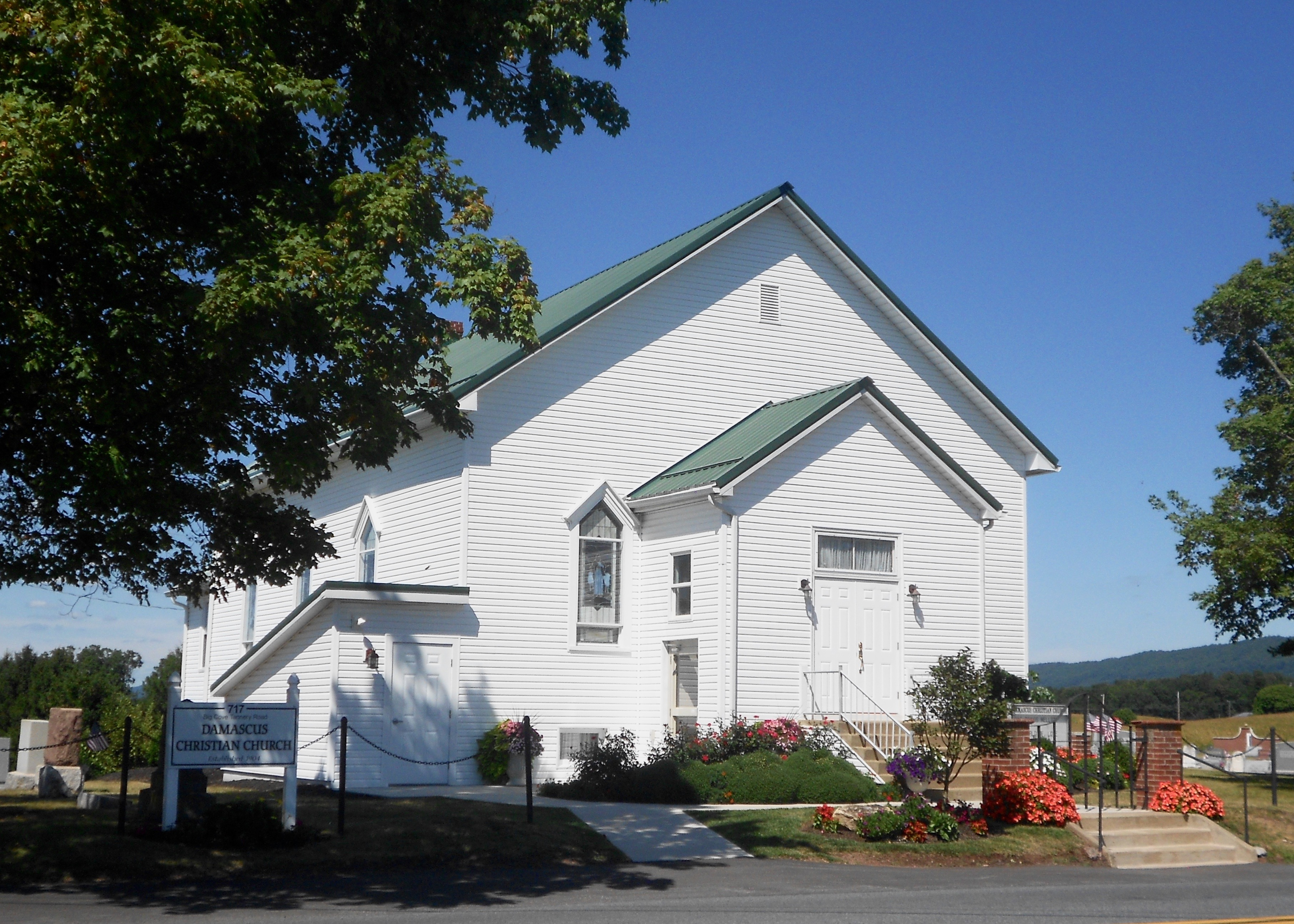
- Damascus Christian Church in August 2015

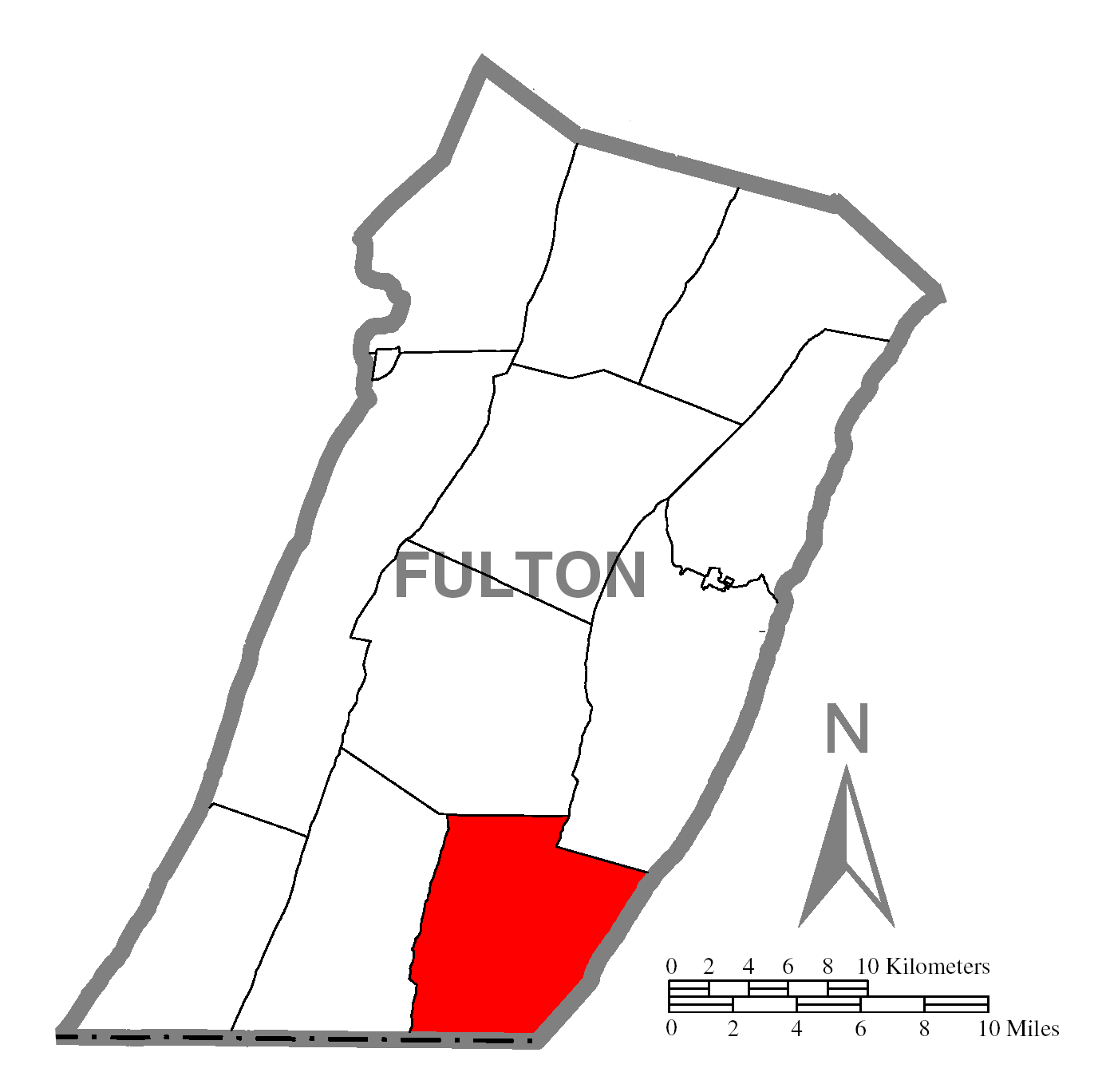
- Location of Thompson Township in Fulton County

- Location of Fulton County in Pennsylvania
- Country: United States
- State: Pennsylvania
- County: Fulton County
- Established: 1849

Area
  - Total: 37.95 sq mi (98.28 km^{2})
  - Land: 37.92 sq mi (98.21 km^{2})
  - Water: 0.027 sq mi (0.07 km^{2})

Population (2020)
  - Total: 1,031 ▼
  - Estimate (2023): 1,036
  - Density: 28.8/sq mi (11.12/km^{2})
- Time zone: UTC-4 (EST)
  - Summer (DST): UTC-5 (EDT)
- FIPS code: 42-057-76488

Thompson Township is a township in Fulton County, Pennsylvania, United States. As of the 2020 census, the township population was 1,031. The only Prohibition Party politician elected in the 21st century, James Hedges, served as a local tax assessor.

== Geography ==
According to the United States Census Bureau, the township has a total area of 38.0 square miles (98.3 km^{2}), of which 37.9 square miles (98.3 km^{2}) is land and 0.03% is water.

== Demographics ==
Historical population
Census	Pop.	Note	%±
2000	998		—
2010	1,098		10.0%
2020	1,031		−6.1%
2023 (est.)	1,036		0.5%
U.S. Decennial Census

As of the census of 2000, there were 998 people, 389 households, and 289 families residing in the township. The population density was 26.3 inhabitants per square mile (10.2/km^{2}). There were 441 housing units at an average density of 11.6/sq mi (4.5/km^{2}). The racial makeup of the township was 99.80% White, 0.10% African American and 0.10% Asian. Hispanic or Latino of any race were 0.10% of the population.

There were 389 households, out of which 32.4% had children under the age of 18 living with them, 63.8% were married couples living together, 6.9% had a female householder with no husband present, and 25.7% were non-families. 22.6% of all households were made up of individuals, and 10.0% had someone living alone who was 65 years of age or older. The average household size was 2.57 and the average family size was 3.00.

In the township the population was spread out, with 24.6% under the age of 18, 7.0% from 18 to 24, 29.2% from 25 to 44, 26.8% from 45 to 64, and 12.4% who were 65 years of age or older. The median age was 39 years. For every 100 females, there were 103.7 males. For every 100 females age 18 and over, there were 104.3 males.

The median income for a household in the township was $38,854, and the median income for a family was $41,544. Males had a median income of $29,688 versus $20,625 for females. The per capita income for the township was $19,279. About 5.5% of families and 10.3% of the population were below the poverty line, including 13.1% of those under age 18 and 12.8% of those age 65 or over.
