= 2004 United States presidential election in Missouri =

- November 2, 2004
- Turnout: 65.1% (▲3.9 pp)

Nominee	George W. Bush	John Kerry
Party	Republican	Democratic
Home state	Texas	Massachusetts
Running mate	Dick Cheney	John Edwards
Electoral vote	11	0
Popular vote	1,455,713	1,259,171
Percentage	53.30%	46.10%

Bush
40–50%
50–60%
60–70%
70–80%
Kerry
50–60%
70–80%
80–90%
President before election
George W. Bush
Republican
Elected President
George W. Bush
Republican

The 2004 United States presidential election in Missouri took place on November 2, 2004, and was part of the 2004 United States presidential election. Voters chose 11 representatives, or electors, to the Electoral College, who voted for president and vice president.

Missouri was won by incumbent President George W. Bush by a 7.20% margin of victory. Prior to the election, 10 of 12 news organizations considered this a state Bush would win, or otherwise considered as a red state. He also won a wide majority of the counties and congressional districts in the state.

At the time, Missouri was known for its status as a bellwether state, having voted for the winner of every presidential election since 1904, apart from 1956. Although the state's streak of voting for the winner of the presidency continued, Bush carried this state with a larger margin of victory than his nationwide results, indicating that the state had become more conservative than the rest of the country and that it was trending Republican. These factors eventually led the state to lose its bellwether status in the next election, albeit by a narrow margin.

== Primaries ==
- 2004 Missouri Democratic presidential primary
- 2004 Missouri Republican presidential primary

== Campaign ==
=== Predictions ===
There were 12 news organizations who made state-by-state predictions of the election. Here are their last predictions before election day.

Source	Ranking
D.C. Political Report	Lean R
Associated Press	Lean R
CNN	Likely R
Cook Political Report	Lean R
Newsweek	Lean R
New York Times	Lean R
Rasmussen Reports	Likely R
Research 2000	Toss-up
Washington Post	Likely R
Washington Times	Toss-up
Zogby International	Likely R
Washington Dispatch	Likely R

=== Polling ===
From May 2004, Bush won every single poll from the state. The final three polls taken from the state averaged Bush leading with 51% to 45%.

=== Fundraising ===
Bush raised $4,026,802. Kerry raised $1,418,159.

=== Advertising and visits ===
This state was considered a major swing state. Both the Republican ticket and Democratic ticket visited the state seven times in the general election. Kerry focused mostly on the urban areas such as St. Louis and Kansas City, while Bush focused more on rural such as Warrenton and Sedalia.

== Analysis ==
This was a better result for President Bush than 2000, when he carried the state by only 3%. In 2004, he received 265,789 more votes than in 2000, while Kerry won only 148,033 more votes than Gore in 2000. Bush won by a 7% margin. Kerry won just four counties in the state: Jackson County, Ste. Genevieve, St. Louis County, and St. Louis City. As of the 2024 presidential election, this is the last election in which Boone County, home to Columbia and the University of Missouri, voted for the Republican candidate.

== Results ==
2004 United States presidential election in Missouri
Party	Candidate	Votes	Percentage	Electoral votes
Republican Party	George W. Bush (incumbent)	1,455,713	53.30%	11
Democratic Party	John Kerry	1,259,171	46.10%	0
Libertarian Party	Michael Badnarik	9,831	0.36%	0
Constitution Party	Michael Peroutka	5,355	0.20%	0
Write In	Ralph Nader	1,294	0.05%	0
Totals		2,731,364	100.00%	11
Voter turnout (voting age population)				63.6%

=== By county ===
County	George W. Bush Republican		John Kerry Democratic		Various candidates Other parties		Margin		Total
County	#	%	#	%	#	%	#	%	Total
Adair	6,367	55.83%	4,938	43.30%	99	0.87%	1,429	12.53%	11,404
Andrew	5,135	62.12%	3,069	37.13%	62	0.75%	2,066	24.99%	8,266
Atchison	2,137	67.71%	1,005	31.84%	14	0.44%	1,132	35.87%	3,156
Audrain	6,294	58.92%	4,318	40.42%	71	0.66%	1,976	18.50%	10,683
Barry	9,599	68.92%	4,223	30.32%	105	0.75%	5,376	38.60%	13,927
Barton	4,572	76.31%	1,373	22.92%	46	0.77%	3,199	53.39%	5,991
Bates	5,004	59.11%	3,398	40.14%	64	0.75%	1,606	18.97%	8,466
Benton	5,575	61.88%	3,381	37.53%	53	0.59%	2,194	24.35%	9,009
Bollinger	4,102	69.58%	1,754	29.75%	39	0.66%	2,348	39.83%	5,895
Boone	37,801	49.71%	37,643	49.50%	602	0.79%	158	0.21%	76,046
Buchanan	19,812	52.21%	17,799	46.90%	339	0.89%	2,013	5.31%	37,950
Butler	11,696	71.14%	4,666	28.38%	79	0.48%	7,030	42.76%	16,441
Caldwell	2,593	60.75%	1,645	38.54%	30	0.70%	948	22.21%	4,268
Callaway	11,108	62.50%	6,559	36.90%	106	0.60%	4,549	25.60%	17,773
Camden	13,122	67.23%	6,296	32.26%	101	0.52%	6,826	34.97%	19,519
Cape Girardeau	23,814	68.90%	10,568	30.57%	183	0.53%	13,246	38.33%	34,565
Carroll	3,155	66.55%	1,568	33.07%	18	0.38%	1,587	33.48%	4,741
Carter	1,797	64.66%	964	34.69%	18	0.64%	833	29.97%	2,779
Cass	27,253	61.63%	16,681	37.73%	283	0.64%	10,572	23.90%	44,217
Cedar	4,238	68.32%	1,910	30.79%	55	0.89%	2,328	37.53%	6,203
Chariton	2,421	55.78%	1,892	43.59%	27	0.62%	529	12.19%	4,340
Christian	22,102	70.51%	9,059	28.90%	187	0.60%	13,043	41.61%	31,348
Clark	1,899	50.83%	1,794	48.02%	43	1.15%	105	2.81%	3,736
Clay	51,193	53.07%	44,670	46.31%	597	0.62%	6,523	6.76%	96,460
Clinton	5,287	55.42%	4,165	43.66%	88	0.92%	1,122	11.76%	9,540
Cole	24,752	67.44%	11,753	32.02%	196	0.54%	12,999	35.42%	36,701
Cooper	5,058	67.37%	2,400	31.97%	50	0.66%	2,658	35.40%	7,508
Crawford	5,686	60.61%	3,632	38.72%	63	0.68%	2,054	21.89%	9,381
Dade	2,963	72.46%	1,104	27.00%	22	0.55%	1,859	45.46%	4,089
Dallas	4,788	65.96%	2,407	33.16%	64	0.88%	2,381	32.80%	7,259
Daviess	2,351	61.97%	1,402	36.95%	41	1.08%	949	25.02%	3,794
DeKalb	2,941	62.76%	1,707	36.43%	38	0.81%	1,234	26.33%	4,686
Dent	4,369	69.31%	1,865	29.58%	70	1.12%	2,504	39.73%	6,304
Douglas	4,498	71.09%	1,741	27.52%	88	1.39%	2,757	43.57%	6,327
Dunklin	6,720	57.55%	4,901	41.97%	56	0.48%	1,819	15.58%	11,677
Franklin	26,429	58.32%	18,556	40.95%	333	0.73%	7,873	17.37%	45,318
Gasconade	4,753	66.28%	2,355	32.84%	63	0.88%	2,398	33.44%	7,171
Gentry	2,085	62.95%	1,201	36.26%	26	0.79%	884	26.69%	3,312
Greene	77,885	62.18%	46,657	37.25%	724	0.58%	31,228	24.93%	125,266
Grundy	3,172	65.97%	1,561	32.47%	75	1.56%	1,611	33.50%	4,808
Harrison	2,729	67.42%	1,279	31.60%	40	0.99%	1,450	35.82%	4,048
Henry	6,361	58.48%	4,461	41.01%	55	0.51%	1,900	17.47%	10,877
Hickory	2,791	57.36%	2,043	41.99%	32	0.66%	748	15.37%	4,866
Holt	1,864	69.27%	811	30.14%	16	0.59%	1,053	39.13%	2,691
Howard	2,915	59.24%	1,972	40.07%	34	0.69%	943	19.17%	4,921
Howell	11,097	67.75%	5,118	31.25%	164	1.00%	5,979	36.50%	16,379
Iron	2,477	52.94%	2,157	46.10%	45	0.96%	320	6.84%	4,679
Jackson	130,500	41.30%	183,654	58.12%	1,839	0.58%	-53,154	-16.82%	315,993
Jasper	31,846	70.64%	13,002	28.84%	237	0.53%	18,844	41.80%	45,085
Jefferson	46,624	49.99%	46,057	49.38%	583	0.63%	567	0.61%	93,264
Johnson	12,257	60.57%	7,790	38.50%	189	0.93%	4,467	22.07%	20,236
Knox	1,207	61.02%	761	38.47%	10	0.51%	446	22.55%	1,978
Laclede	10,578	71.14%	4,213	28.33%	78	0.52%	6,365	42.81%	14,869
Lafayette	9,656	59.67%	6,412	39.62%	114	0.70%	3,244	20.05%	16,182
Lawrence	11,194	70.82%	4,506	28.51%	106	0.67%	6,688	42.31%	15,806
Lewis	2,862	61.63%	1,754	37.77%	28	0.60%	1,108	23.86%	4,644
Lincoln	11,316	57.04%	8,368	42.18%	155	0.78%	2,948	14.86%	19,839
Linn	3,422	58.02%	2,440	41.37%	36	0.61%	982	16.65%	5,898
Livingston	4,029	63.49%	2,278	35.90%	39	0.61%	1,751	27.59%	6,346
Macon	4,673	61.73%	2,856	37.73%	41	0.54%	1,817	24.00%	7,570
Madison	2,905	59.07%	1,972	40.10%	41	0.83%	933	18.97%	4,918
Maries	2,825	63.86%	1,563	35.33%	36	0.81%	1,262	28.53%	4,424
Marion	7,815	62.76%	4,568	36.68%	70	0.56%	3,247	26.08%	12,453
McDonald	5,443	70.46%	2,215	28.67%	67	0.87%	3,228	41.79%	7,725
Mercer	1,207	66.43%	582	32.03%	28	1.54%	625	34.40%	1,817
Miller	7,797	71.99%	2,959	27.32%	75	0.69%	4,838	44.67%	10,831
Mississippi	2,903	54.79%	2,374	44.81%	21	0.40%	529	9.98%	5,298
Moniteau	4,743	70.89%	1,913	28.59%	35	0.52%	2,830	42.30%	6,691
Monroe	2,632	61.11%	1,647	38.24%	28	0.65%	985	22.87%	4,307
Montgomery	3,563	61.86%	2,147	37.27%	50	0.87%	1,416	24.59%	5,760
Morgan	5,657	64.50%	3,053	34.81%	61	0.69%	2,604	29.69%	8,771
New Madrid	4,154	52.54%	3,716	47.00%	37	0.47%	438	5.54%	7,907
Newton	17,187	71.95%	6,564	27.48%	138	0.58%	10,623	44.47%	23,889
Nodaway	6,226	61.53%	3,830	37.85%	63	0.62%	2,396	23.68%	10,119
Oregon	2,769	59.26%	1,823	39.01%	81	1.73%	946	20.25%	4,673
Osage	4,975	74.58%	1,673	25.08%	23	0.34%	3,302	49.50%	6,671
Ozark	3,083	65.50%	1,561	33.16%	63	1.34%	1,522	32.34%	4,707
Pemiscot	3,398	49.93%	3,381	49.68%	27	0.40%	17	0.25%	6,806
Perry	5,583	67.70%	2,621	31.78%	43	0.52%	2,962	35.92%	8,247
Pettis	11,603	66.32%	5,801	33.16%	92	0.53%	5,802	33.16%	17,496
Phelps	11,874	63.50%	6,666	35.65%	160	0.85%	5,208	27.85%	18,700
Pike	4,314	53.66%	3,670	45.65%	56	0.70%	644	8.01%	8,040
Platte	23,302	55.52%	18,412	43.87%	256	0.61%	4,890	11.65%	41,970
Polk	8,586	68.95%	3,775	30.31%	92	0.74%	4,811	38.64%	12,453
Pulaski	8,618	70.52%	3,551	29.06%	52	0.43%	5,067	41.46%	12,221
Putnam	1,660	67.89%	772	31.57%	13	0.53%	888	36.32%	2,445
Ralls	2,986	59.32%	2,031	40.35%	17	0.34%	955	18.97%	5,034
Randolph	6,551	64.24%	3,586	35.16%	61	0.60%	2,965	29.08%	10,198
Ray	5,673	52.59%	5,034	46.66%	81	0.75%	639	5.93%	10,788
Reynolds	1,896	56.36%	1,449	43.07%	19	0.57%	447	13.29%	3,364
Ripley	3,693	65.33%	1,907	33.73%	53	0.94%	1,786	31.60%	5,653
Saline	5,389	54.22%	4,479	45.06%	71	0.71%	910	9.16%	9,939
Schuyler	1,124	55.34%	894	44.02%	13	0.64%	230	11.32%	2,031
Scotland	1,352	61.54%	828	37.69%	17	0.77%	524	23.85%	2,197
Scott	11,330	64.94%	6,057	34.71%	61	0.35%	5,273	30.23%	17,448
Shannon	2,511	60.26%	1,618	38.83%	38	0.91%	893	21.43%	4,167
Shelby	2,280	65.11%	1,201	34.29%	21	0.60%	1,079	30.82%	3,502
St. Charles	95,826	58.61%	66,855	40.89%	807	0.50%	28,971	17.72%	163,488
St. Clair	3,098	62.40%	1,841	37.08%	26	0.52%	1,257	25.32%	4,965
St. Francois	12,087	52.71%	10,748	46.87%	98	0.43%	1,339	5.84%	22,933
St. Louis	244,969	45.12%	295,284	54.38%	2,730	0.50%	-50,315	-9.26%	542,983
St. Louis City	27,793	19.22%	116,133	80.29%	712	0.49%	-88,340	-61.07%	144,638
Ste. Genevieve	3,791	46.54%	4,281	52.55%	74	0.91%	-490	-6.01%	8,146
Stoddard	9,242	69.74%	3,946	29.78%	64	0.48%	5,296	39.96%	13,252
Stone	10,534	69.35%	4,578	30.14%	77	0.51%	5,956	39.21%	15,189
Sullivan	1,880	60.86%	1,178	38.14%	31	1.00%	702	22.72%	3,089
Taney	13,578	70.43%	5,601	29.05%	101	0.52%	7,977	41.38%	19,280
Texas	7,234	65.66%	3,664	33.25%	120	1.09%	3,570	32.41%	11,018
Vernon	5,732	63.75%	3,206	35.65%	54	0.60%	2,526	28.10%	8,992
Warren	7,883	58.69%	5,461	40.66%	88	0.66%	2,422	18.03%	13,432
Washington	4,641	50.57%	4,459	48.58%	78	0.85%	182	1.99%	9,178
Wayne	3,919	63.17%	2,250	36.27%	35	0.56%	1,669	26.90%	6,204
Webster	10,194	68.21%	4,657	31.16%	93	0.62%	5,537	37.05%	14,944
Worth	691	61.04%	436	38.52%	5	0.44%	255	22.52%	1,132
Wright	6,090	72.97%	2,188	26.22%	68	0.82%	3,902	46.75%	8,346
Totals	1,455,713	53.30%	1,259,171	46.10%	16,480	0.60%	196,542	7.20%	2,731,364

==== Counties that flipped from Democratic to Republican ====
- Boone (largest city: Columbia)
- Buchanan (largest city: St. Joseph)
- Clay (largest city: Liberty)
- Jefferson (largest city: Arnold)
- Mississippi (largest city: Charleston)
- New Madrid (largest city: New Madrid)
- Pemiscot (largest city: Caruthersville)
- Ray (largest city: Richmond)
- Saline (largest city: Marshall)
- Washington (largest city: Potosi)

=== By congressional district ===
Bush won six of nine congressional districts, including one held by a Democrat.

District	Bush	Kerry	Representative
1st	25%	75%	William Lacy Clay, Jr.
2nd	60%	40%	Todd Akin
3rd	43%	57%	Dick Gephardt
3rd	43%	57%	Russ Carnahan
4th	64%	35%	Ike Skelton
5th	40%	59%	Karen McCarthy
5th	40%	59%	Emanuel Cleaver
6th	57%	42%	Sam Graves
7th	67%	32%	Roy Blunt
8th	64%	36%	Jo Ann Emerson
9th	59%	41%	Kenny Hulshof

== Electors ==
Technically the voters of Missouri cast their ballots for electors: representatives to the Electoral College. Missouri is allocated 11 electors because it has nine congressional districts and two senators. All candidates who appear on the ballot or qualify to receive write-in votes must submit a list of 11 electors, who pledge to vote for their candidate and his or her running mate. Whoever wins the majority of votes in the state is awarded all 11 electoral votes. Their chosen electors then vote for president and vice president. Although electors are pledged to their candidate and running mate, they are not obligated to vote for them. An elector who votes for someone other than his or her candidate is known as a faithless elector.

The electors of each state and the District of Columbia met on December 13, 2004, to cast their votes for president and vice president. The Electoral College itself never meets as one body. Instead, the electors from each state and the District of Columbia met in their respective capitols.

The following were the members of the Electoral College from the state. All 11 were pledged for Bush/Cheney.

1. Rosemary Kochner
2. Fred Dyer
3. Miriam Stonebraker
4. Carolyn McDowell
5. Cathy Owens
6. Steve Krueger
7. Emory Melton
8. John Schudy
9. Richard Hardy
10. John Marschalk
11. Warren Erdman

== See also ==
- United States presidential elections in Missouri
