= Alan Wheat =

American politician (born 1951)

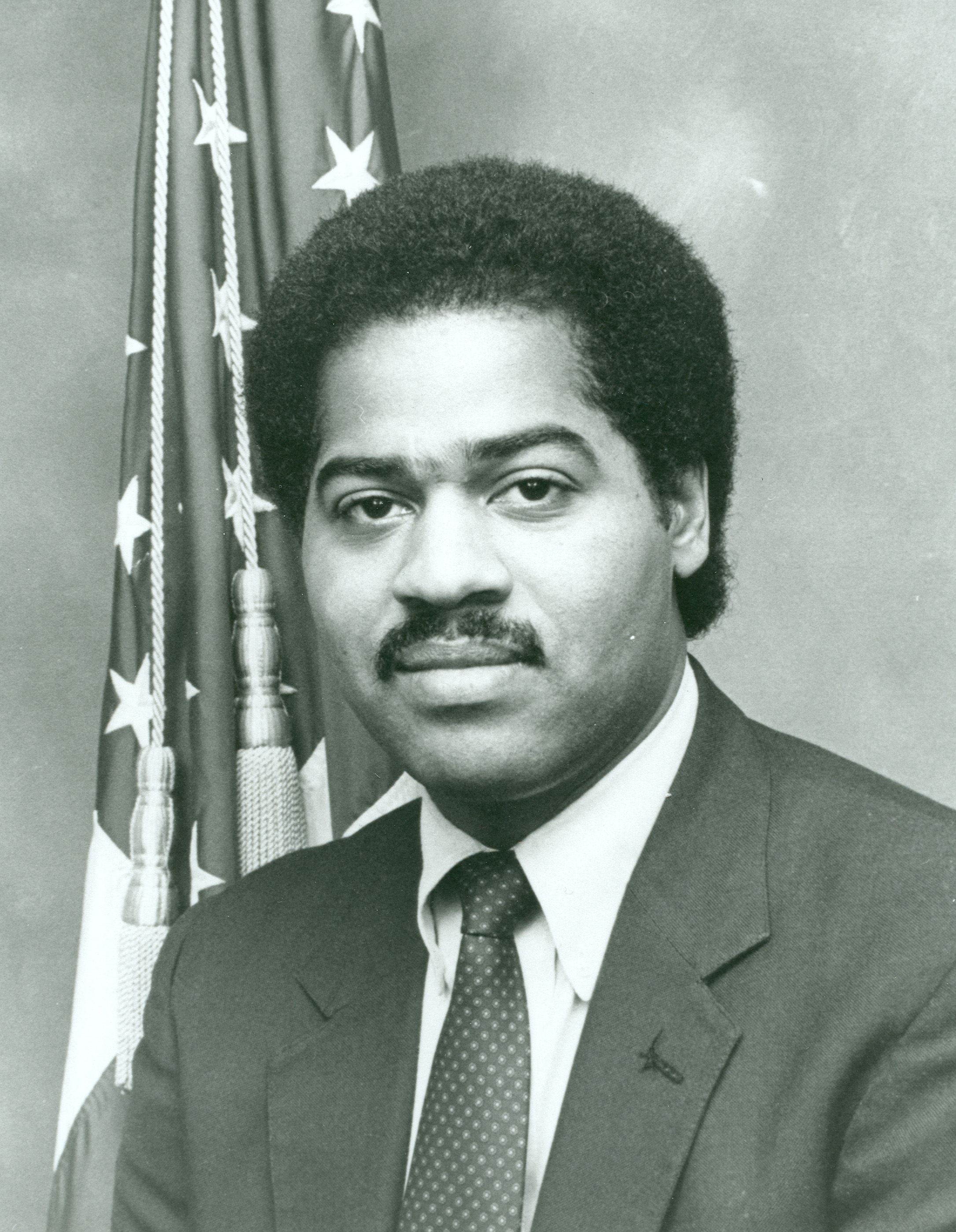

Member of the U.S. House of Representatives from Missouri's 5th district
- In office January 3, 1983 – January 3, 1995
- Preceded by: Richard Bolling
- Succeeded by: Karen McCarthy

Member of the Missouri House of Representatives from the 26th district
- In office January 1977 – January 1983
- Preceded by: Harold Holliday
- Succeeded by: Chris Kelly

Personal details
- Born: Alan Dupree Wheat; October 16, 1951 (age 74) San Antonio, Texas, U.S.
- Party: Democratic
- Children: 3
- Education: Grinnell College (BA)

Alan Dupree Wheat (born October 16, 1951) is an American economist, lobbyist, and politician who served six terms in the U.S. House of Representatives from the state of Missouri from 1983 to 1995.

== Early life ==
His father was James Wheat, an officer and civil engineer in the U.S. Air Force. His mother Emogene (Jean) Wheat was a teacher. Since his father served in the USAF, he grew up in air bases and went to schools in Wichita, Kansas, and Seville in Spain. In 1968, he graduated from Airline High School in Bossier City, Louisiana. Wheat was hired by the Department of Housing and Urban Development as an economist in 1972 after passing his B.A. in economics at Grinnell College, in Iowa. Between 1973 and 1975 he joined the Mid–America Regional Council in Kansas City for the same role. In 1975 he then became an aide to Mike White a Jackson County, Missouri, executive.

=== Missouri legislature ===
In 1976, he was elected at age 25 to the Missouri general assembly and stayed there until 1982.

=== Campaign for Congress ===
When Congressman Richard Bolling retired at the 1982 House of Representatives election, Wheat won the Democratic primary by only 1,004 votes (11%). He went on to win the general election to succeed Bolling by beating Republican John Sharp with 58% of the votes.

== House career and Senate campaign ==
Wheat was the youngest member of the United States House of Representatives ever to be appointed to the Rules Committee, and was also the first African-American to represent a district with a non-liberal white majority. He was also a member of the United States House Select Committee on Children, Youth, and Families.

In 1992, Wheat drew four opponents in the Democratic primary election. He was perceived to be vulnerable due to the House banking scandal and his having been one of the House members who had made overdrafts. Wheat survived the primary and defeated Republican Edward “Gomer” Moody, who was a well-known Missouri businessman. Wheat won the general election, which also included two third-party candidates, with 59% of the vote.

After United States Senator John Danforth said he would not run for re-election in 1994, Wheat chose to leave the House and instead run for Danforth's seat. The Senate race was closely watched nationally because Wheat was perceived as a candidate who could win crossover votes, as the House district he represented was 70 percent white. Wheat lost the general election to former governor John Ashcroft. Karen McCarthy was elected to succeed him in the House.

== Post-congressional career ==
After his Senate race, Wheat was chosen as vice president of Public Policy and Government Relations at CARE. He served as deputy campaign manager and director of constituent outreach of President Bill Clinton's re-election campaign in 1996. In 1997, Wheat formed the lobbying group Wheat Government Relations.

Wheat joined the national law firm and lobbying practice Polsinelli in 2013, as the firm's Public Policy practice chair.

In 2021, Wheat helped found Wheat Shroyer Government Relations, a public service-oriented lobbying firm, where he currently serves as Chairman.

Wheat currently serves on the board of directors at CARE.

== Personal life ==
Wheat has three children.

== See also ==
- List of African-American United States representatives

U.S. House of Representatives
Preceded by Richard Bolling	Member of the U.S. House of Representatives from Missouri's 5th congressional district 1983–1995	Succeeded by Karen McCarthy
Party political offices
Preceded by Jay Nixon	Democratic nominee for U.S. Senator from Missouri (Class 1); 1994	Succeeded by Mel Carnahan
U.S. order of precedence (ceremonial)
Preceded by Mike Michaud as Former U.S. Representative	Order of precedence of the United States as Former U.S. Representative	Succeeded by Kenny Hulshof as Former U.S. Representative
