= Karen McCarthy =

American politician (1947–2010)

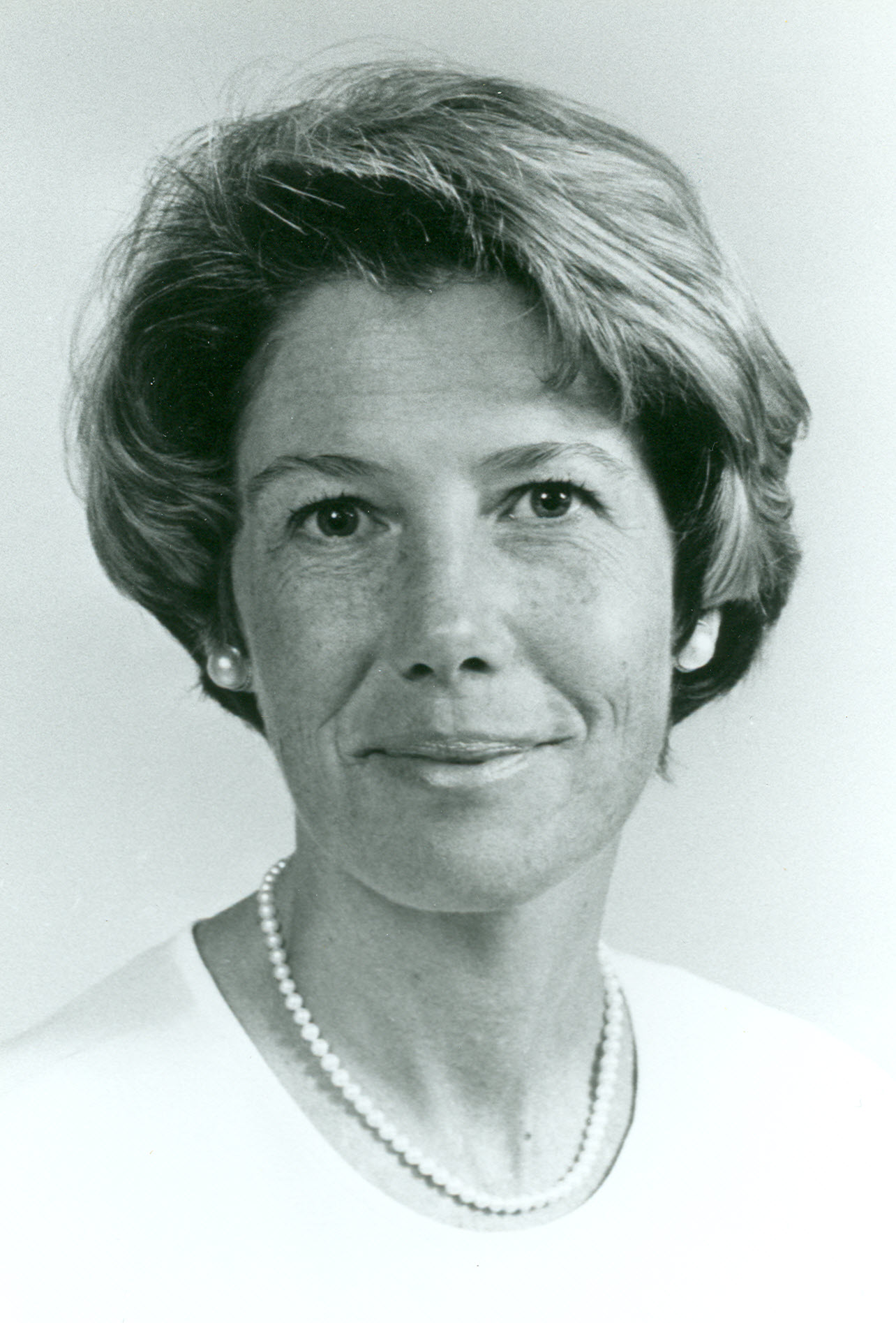

Member of the U.S. House of Representatives from Missouri's 5th district
- In office January 3, 1995 – January 3, 2005
- Preceded by: Alan Wheat
- Succeeded by: Emanuel Cleaver

Member of the Missouri House of Representatives
- In office 1977–1995

President of the National Conference of State Legislatures
- In office 1994
- Preceded by: Robert Connor
- Succeeded by: Jane L. Campbell

Personal details
- Born: March 18, 1947 Haverhill, Massachusetts, U.S.
- Died: October 5, 2010 (aged 63) Overland Park, Kansas, U.S.
- Party: Democratic
- Education: University of Kansas (BS, MBA); University of Missouri (MA)
- Profession: Teacher

Karen McCarthy (March 18, 1947 – October 5, 2010) was an American educator and politician. She served as the U.S. representative for the fifth district of Missouri from 1995 to 2005.

== Early life ==
McCarthy was born in Haverhill, Massachusetts, and grew up in Leawood, Kansas, and graduated from Shawnee Mission East High School. She received a Bachelor of Science degree in biology and English from the University of Kansas in 1969 and a Master of Arts in English education from the University of Missouri–Kansas City in 1976. McCarthy later earned an M.B.A. at the University of Kansas. Prior to running for public office, McCarthy taught English at Shawnee Mission South High School and the Sunset Hill School.

== Missouri state politics ==
First elected to the Missouri House of Representatives in 1976 as a Democrat, McCarthy was re-elected eight times, generally with little opposition. She became a ranking party member in the state House, serving on numerous committees including chairman of Ways and Means (1983-1995), and a member of the Appropriations and Energy committees. McCarthy also served as the first female president of the National Conference of State Legislatures in 1994.

== House career ==
In 1994, Congressman Alan Wheat ran for the U.S. Senate, leaving an open seat. McCarthy won a crowded six-way primary, and then defeated Republican Ron Freeman with 56 percent of the vote. She was easily reelected four more times. McCarthy served on the Energy and Commerce committee (subcommittees: Commerce, Trade and Consumer Protection, Energy and Air Quality, Telecommunications and Internet and Environment and Hazardous Materials) and the Select Committee on Homeland Security as the ranking Democrat on the Intelligence and Counterterrorism subcommittee.

McCarthy announced in 2003 that she would not run for a sixth term in 2004 after revealing that she suffered from alcoholism. A widely reported incident in which an intoxicated McCarthy fell down inside a House office building forced her to admit her problem and seek treatment.

Selected honors include the Missouri Citizens for the Arts 2005 Advocacy Award and the Business and Professional Women of the USA's Woman of the Year award.

== Global climate change activities ==
McCarthy served as co-chair of the Missouri Commission of Global Climate Change, an extensive two-year (1989–1991) study of scientific data to develop environmental and economic policy options for state action. She was also a congressional representative to the Kyoto Protocol on global climate change and a Harvard fellow at the Institute of Politics at the John F. Kennedy School of Government "The Politics of Alternative Energies", in the fall of 1982.

== Post-congressional activities and death ==
In December 2003, McCarthy announced that she would not seek another term in the House. She was succeeded by Emanuel Cleaver, a fellow Democrat. McCarthy returned to Kansas City, Missouri, where she sat on a number of boards and was an active fundraiser and sponsor for a variety of cultural and political activities.

In June 2009, her family revealed that McCarthy was suffering from an advanced form of Alzheimer's disease and was residing in a nursing home. Their statement said her difficulties were compounded by a bipolar disorder that apparently went undiagnosed for at least a decade. A non-injury car accident involving McCarthy at her home in April prompted her friends to seek medical help, which revealed her illnesses.

McCarthy died on October 5, 2010, at age 63.

== Electoral history ==
Missouri's 5th congressional district: Results 1994–2002
Year	Democrat	Votes	Pct	Republican	Votes	Pct	3rd Party	Party	Votes	Pct	3rd Party	Party	Votes	Pct	
1994	Karen McCarthy	100,391	57%	Ron Freeman	77,120	43%									
1996	Karen McCarthy	144,223	67%	Penny Bennett	61,803	29%	Kevin Hertel	Libertarian	4,110	2%	Tom Danaher	Natural Law	3,835	2%	
1998	Karen McCarthy	101,313	66%	Penny Bennett	47,582	31%	Grant S. Stauffer	Libertarian	2,646	2%	Elizabeth Ann Dulaney	Reform	2,144	1%	
2000	Karen McCarthy	159,826	69%	Steve Gordon	66,439	29%	Charles Reitz	Green	2,548	1%	Alan Newberry	Libertarian	2,350	1%	*
2002	Karen McCarthy	122,645	66%	Steve Gordon	60,245	32%	Jeanne Bojarski	Libertarian	3,277	2%					

*Write-in and minor candidate notes: In 2000, Reform candidate Dennis M. Carriger received 974 votes.

== See also ==
- Women in the United States House of Representatives

Missouri House of Representatives
Preceded by James G. Baker	Member of the Missouri House of Representatives from the 27th district 1977–1983	Succeeded by W. A. "Bill" Markland
Preceded by Mike Ethington	Member of the Missouri House of Representatives from the 40th district 1983–1993	Succeeded by Henry C. Rizzo
Preceded by Jacqueline T. "Jackie" McGee	Member of the Missouri House of Representatives from the 38th district 1993–1995	Succeeded by Tim Van Zandt
U.S. House of Representatives
Preceded by Alan Wheat	Member of the U.S. House of Representatives from Missouri's 5th congressional district 1995–2005	Succeeded by Emanuel Cleaver
