= International Religious Freedom Caucus =

The Congressional International Religious Freedom (IRF) Caucus is a bi-partisan group of nearly 60 members of the United States Congress who address religious persecution for people of any or no faith based on Article 18 of the United Nations Declaration of Human Rights. The IRF Caucus has always addressed religious freedom within the broader context of human rights in the spirit of the International Religious Freedom Act of 1998 (IRFA). The Caucus plays a critical role in raising the profile of numerous religious freedom issues in Congress and with both the Bush and Obama Administrations, and led to the release of many individuals imprisoned for their faith and ensures relief for many suffering under religious persecution.

== History ==
Established in 2006 by bipartisan co-founders Trent Franks, a Republican from Arizona, and Emanuel Cleaver, II, a Democrat from Missouri, the Caucus has worked to ensure that religoious freedom remains a high priority in United States foreign policy, development, and refugee law. With nearly 60 members, the Caucus utilizes international standards as a basis for defining an individual's right to freedom of religious belief, including Article 18 of the Universal Declaration of Human Rights, which states:

Everyone has the right to freedom of thought, conscience and religion; this right includes freedom to change his religion or belief, and freedom, either alone or in community with others and in public or private, to manifest his religion or belief in teaching, practice, worship and observance.

In the past, the Caucus has held several public hearings on the religious freedom situation in countries such as Bahrain, Bangladesh, Burma, China, Egypt, India, Iran, Iraq, Kazakhstan, Malaysia, North Korea, Nigeria, Pakistan, Saudi Arabia, Sudan, Turkey, and Vietnam. In addition, the Caucus has raised dozens of specific cases of persecution in urgent need of attention with foreign governments. Most recently, the Caucus coordinated efforts to secure the release of individuals imprisoned for their faith or human rights activities, including Sayed Mussa in Afghanistan and Kareem Abdul Soleiman Amer in Egypt, the safety and asylum of persecuted individuals, and the defeat of the "defamation of religions" resolution at the United Nations.

== Leadership ==
The current co-chairs of the International Religious Freedom Caucus are Gus Bilirakis (Republican) and Dan Lipinski (Democrat)

== Members, 112th Congress ==
Majority	Minority
Trent Franks, Arizona, Co-Chair; Robert Aderholt, Alabama; Todd Akin, Missouri; Michele Bachmann, Minnesota; Gus Bilirakis, Florida; Paul Broun, Georgia; Ann Marie Buerkle, New York; Dan Burton, Indiana; Ken Calvert, California; John Carter, Texas; Howard Coble, North Carolina; Jeff Duncan, South Carolina; Randy Forbes, Virginia; Jeff Fortenberry, Nebraska; Virginia Foxx, North Carolina; Scott Garrett, New Jersey; Trey Gowdy, South Carolina; Tim Griffin, Arkansas; Vicky Hartzler, Missouri; Wally Herger, California; Tim Huelskamp, Kansas; Randy Hultgren, Illinois; Doug Lamborn, Solorado; James Lankford, Oklahoma; Dan Lungren, California; Tom Marino, Pennsylvania; Thaddeus McCotter, Michigan; Patrick McHenry, North Carolina; Mike Pence, Indiana; Joseph Pitts, Pennsylvania; Ted Poe, Texas; Mike Pompeo, Kansas; Scott Rigell, Virginia; Mike Rogers, Alabama; Dana Rohrabacher, California; Peter Roskam, Illinois; Jim Sensenbrenner, Wisconsin, Chris Smith, New Jersey; Frank Wolf, Virginia	Heath Shuler, North Carolina, Co-Chair; Shelley Berkley, Nevada; Leonard Boswell, Iowa; Michael Capuano, Massachusetts; Dennis Cardoza, California; Andre Carson, Indiana; Donna Christensen, US Virgin Islands; Yvette Clarke, New York; Emanuel Cleaver II, Missouri; Gerald Connolly, Virginia; Joseph Crowley, New York; Keith Ellison, Minnesota; Al Green, Texas; Luis Gutierrez, Illinois; Rush Holt, New Jersey; Zoe Lofgren, California; Nita Lowey, New York; Carolyn Maloney, New York; James Matheson, Utah; James McGovern, Massachusetts; Mike McIntyre, North Carolina; Michael Michaud, Maine; John Olver, Massachusetts; Charles Rangel, New York; Loretta Sanchez, California; Robert Scott, Virginia; Brad Sherman, California; Chris Van Hollen, Maryland; Henry Waxman, California
