= Keep the Promise Act of 2013 =

Proposed but failed United States federal law

- Long title: To prohibit gaming activities on certain Indian lands in Arizona until the expiration of certain gaming compacts.
- Announced in: the 113th United States Congress
- Sponsored by: Rep. Trent Franks (R, AZ-8)
- Number of co-sponsors: 5

Codification
- Acts affected: Indian Gaming Regulatory Act
- Agencies affected: United States Congress, United States Department of the Interior,

Legislative history
- Introduced in the House as H.R. 1410 by Rep. Trent Franks (R, AZ-8) on April 9, 2013; Committee consideration by United States House Committee on Natural Resources,

The Keep the Promise Act of 2013 (H.R. 1410) is a bill that was introduced into the United States House of Representatives during 113th United States Congress. The bill would prohibit the establishment of casinos on land in the Phoenix, Arizona metropolitan area on Indian land acquired after April 9, 2013. If passed, the bill would have the immediate impact of preventing the Tohono O'odham Nation from building a casino on a piece of land in the Phoenix area which they purchased in 2003, and are currently in the process of having designated a reservation (a necessary step for the land to be used to build a casino). The law is seen as being directed at them.

== Provisions of the bill ==
This summary is based largely on the summary provided by the Congressional Research Service, a public domain source.

The Keep the Promise Act of 2013, would prohibit Class II and III gaming on land within the Phoenix, Arizona, metropolitan area that is acquired after April 9, 2013, by the Secretary of the Interior in trust for the benefit of an Indian tribe.

The bill would terminate that prohibition on January 1, 2027.

== Procedural history ==
=== House ===
The Keep the Promise Act of 2013 was introduced into the House on April 9, 2013 by Rep. Trent Franks (R, AZ-8). The bill was referred to the United States House Committee on Natural Resources and the United States House Natural Resources Subcommittee on Indian and Alaska Native Affairs. The subcommittee held hearings about the bill on May 16, 2013. A markup session and committee consideration was held on July 24, 2013, when the committee ordered it to be reported by a vote of 35–5. The House Majority Leader Eric Cantor placed the bill on the House Schedule on September 13, 2013 for consideration under a suspension of the rules on September 17.

== Debate and discussion ==
If passed, the bill would have the immediate impact of preventing the Tohono O'odham Native American tribe from building a casino on a piece of land in the Phoenix area which they purchased in 2003. The law is seen as being directed directly at them.

In 2002, voters in Arizona approved Proposition 202, the "Indian Gaming Preservation and Self-reliance Act," which changed some of the definitions surrounding casinos in Arizona. At the time, there was also an agreement made (the degree to which it was legally binding is disputed) among the Indian tribes in Arizona to limit the number of casinos created. The casino the Tohono O'odham tribe is trying to build is seen by opponents as a violation of this agreement.

Indian casinos can only be built on Indian reservations. The Department of the Interior approved the purchase and designation of this land by the Tohono O'odham tribe in response to a 1986 federal law that allowed them additional land to compensate them for land damaged by a federal dam.

Opponents of the bill gave several reasons why. Representative Tom McClintock (R-CA) was opposed to the bill because it would hurt job creation and break a promise to the Tohono O'odham tribe. Tohono O’odham Nation Chairman Ned Norris Jr. objected to the bill because it is "special interest legislation" that creates a "no-competition zone" for the two tribes that already have casinos in that area.

Proponents of the bill included Gila River Indian Community Gov. Gregory Mendoza, who was in favor of the bill because he believes that the compact not to build more casinos needs to be respected. The Tohono O’odham Nation argues that federal rules allows casinos on reservation land created after 17 October 1988 if they are part of a settlement of a land claim. The Nation claims the West Valley land is partial replacement to settle a claim for the 10,000 acres (40 km^{2}) of its lands that were flooded as a result of the construction of the Painted Rock Dam on the Gila River.

== See also ==
- List of bills in the 113th United States Congress
- Tohono O'odham
- Native American gaming
