= Trent Franks =

American politician (born 1957)

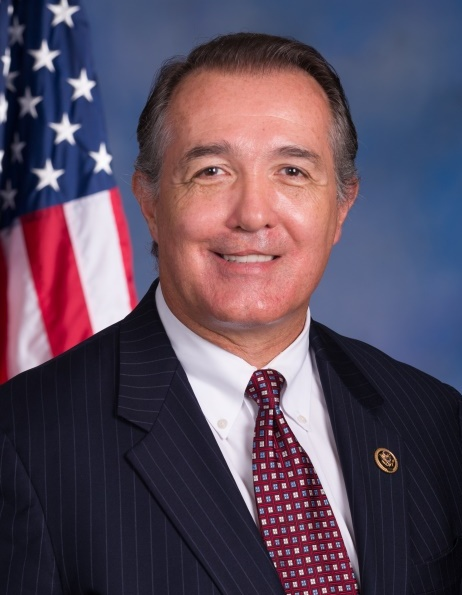
- Official portrait, 2015

Member of the U.S. House of Representatives from Arizona
- In office January 3, 2003 – December 8, 2017
- Preceded by: Bob Stump (redistricted)
- Succeeded by: Debbie Lesko
- Constituency: 2nd district (2003–2013); 8th district (2013–2017)

Member of the Arizona House of Representatives from the 20th district
- In office January 1985 – January 1987 Serving with Debbie McCune Davis
- Preceded by: Glenn Davis
- Succeeded by: Bobby Raymond

Personal details
- Born: Harold Trent Franks; June 19, 1957 (age 69) Uravan, Colorado, U.S.
- Party: Republican
- Spouse: Josephine Franks (m. 1980)
- Children: 2
- Education: Ottawa University, Arizona (attended)

Harold Trent Franks (born June 19, 1957) is an American businessman and former politician who served as the U.S. representative for Arizona's 8th congressional district from 2003 to 2017 (numbered as the 2nd district from 2003 to 2013). He is a member of the Republican Party. During his tenure, Franks served as vice chairman of the United States House Armed Services Subcommittee on Strategic Forces and chairman of the United States House Judiciary Subcommittee on the Constitution, Civil Rights and Civil Liberties.

In December 2017, the House Ethics Committee announced that it would investigate allegations of sexual harassment against Franks. Franks had repeatedly asked two female staffers to bear his children as surrogate mothers, and allegedly offered one of them $5 million to carry his child and retaliated against her when she declined. The women feared that Franks wanted to impregnate them sexually as part of the surrogacy process. Franks acknowledged discussing surrogacy with the aides but denied the other allegations; he resigned from Congress immediately after the ethics investigation was announced, blaming his situation on "the current cultural and media climate."

== Early life and education ==
Franks was born in Uravan, Colorado, a uranium mining company town which became a ghost town. Franks is the son of Juanita and Edward Taylor Franks. He was born with a cleft lip and palate. After his parents separated, Franks took care of his younger siblings. Franks graduated from Briggsdale High School in Colorado in 1976.

In 1987, he completed a course of study at the non-accredited Utah's National Center for Constitutional Studies, formerly known as the Freemen Institute. For one year, from 1989 to 1990, he attended the Arizona campus of Ottawa University.

== Early career ==
After high school, Franks bought a drilling rig and moved to Texas to drill wells with his best friend and his younger brother. He moved to Arizona in 1981, where he continued to drill wells.

=== Arizona House of Representatives ===
In 1984, while working as an engineer for an oil and gas royalty-purchasing firm, Franks began his political career by running in a heavily Democratic district for a seat in the Arizona House of Representatives, against incumbent Democrat Glenn Davis. Franks campaigned on a conservative "Reagan Republican" platform emphasizing stronger child protection laws as well as the overturning of Roe v. Wade. He narrowly won the election by 155 votes amid that year's massive national Republican wave. In the state legislature, Franks served as Vice-Chairman of the Commerce Committee and Chairman of the House Subcommittee on Child Protection and Family Preservation.

In November 1988, Franks ran again for a legislative seat, moving to District 18 shortly before the filing deadline. He lost that election.

=== Arizona governor's cabinet ===
In January 1987, he was appointed by Republican Governor Evan Mecham to head the Arizona Governor's Office for Children, a cabinet-level division of the governor's office responsible for overseeing and coordinating state policy and programs for Arizona's children.

Franks then founded the Arizona Family Research Institute, a nonprofit organization affiliated with Focus on the Family. He was the executive director of the organization for four and a half years. He was successful in the Republican primary but lost in the November general election.

=== Political activism ===
In 1992, when Franks was chairman of Arizonans for Common Sense, one of the organization's efforts was a constitutional amendment on the November 1992 ballot to "protect most preborn children in Arizona from abortion on demand." The initiative lost, getting about 35 percent of the votes cast.

In August 1995, Arizonans for an Empowered Future, of which Franks was chairman, launched an initiative campaign to amend the state constitution, replacing the graduated state income tax with a flat 3.5 percent rate, and allowing parents to deduct the costs of private school tuition. That effort was also unsuccessful. Later that year, Franks, became the original author and leading proponent of the successful passage of the Tuition Tax Credit Bill in Arizona. The initiative was not one of those appearing on the ballot in 1996.

In 1997, Trent Franks, along with his brother, Lane Franks, founded Liberty Petroleum Corporation, a petroleum exploration company. That year, Franks also worked as a consultant and surrogate speaker for conservative activist Pat Buchanan's presidential campaign.

== U.S. House of Representatives ==
=== Elections ===
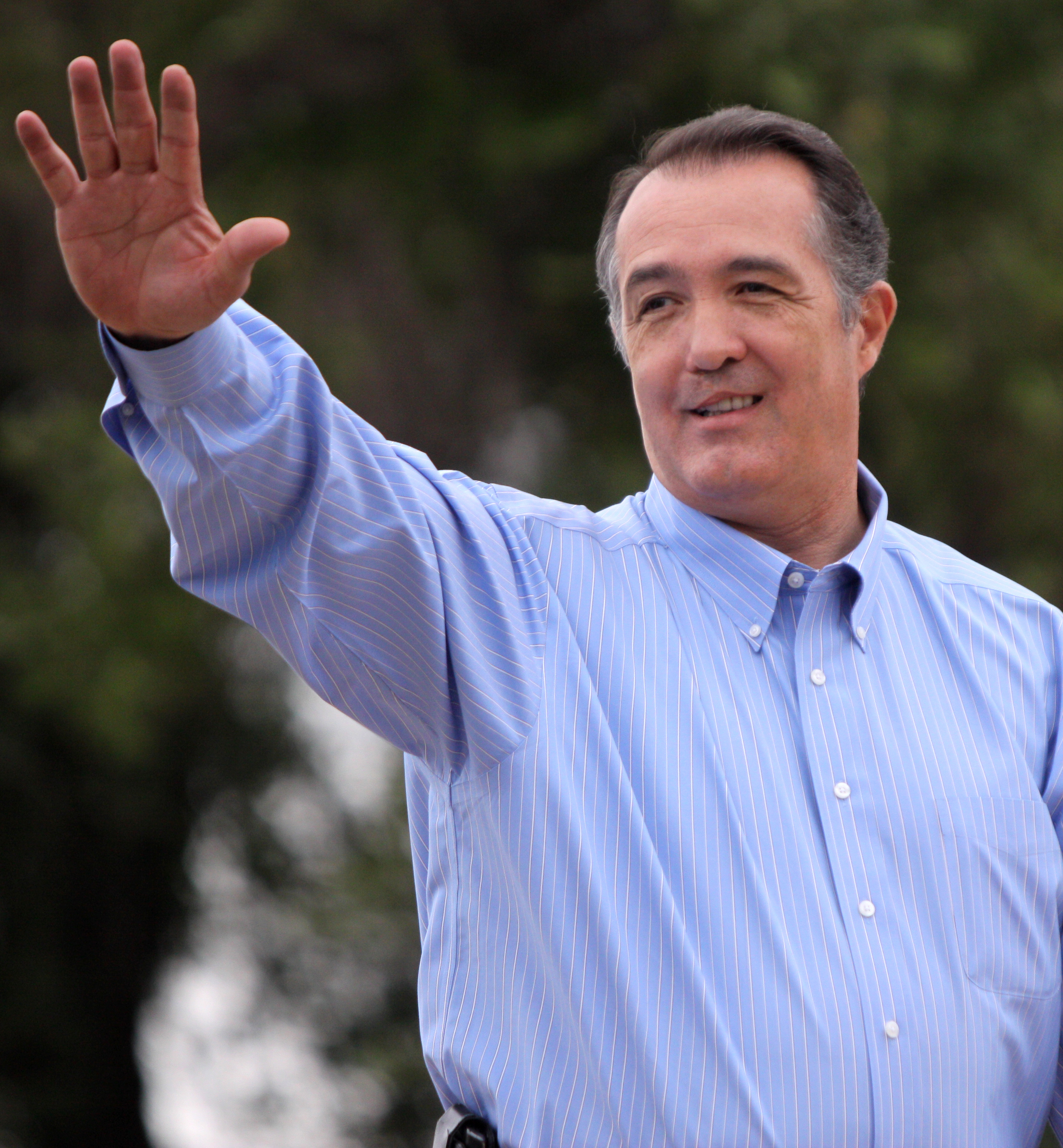
Franks at the 2011 Veterans Day parade in Phoenix, Arizona

==== 1994 ====
Franks ran for Arizona's 4th congressional district in 1994, after incumbent U.S. Representative Jon Kyl decided to run for the U.S. Senate. He lost to John Shadegg, 43–30%.

==== 2002 ====
Following the 2000 census, Arizona got two additional seats. Franks' home in Glendale was drawn into the 2nd district. That district had previously been the 3rd District, represented by 13-term incumbent Republican Bob Stump, who was not running for reelection. The initial favorite in the race was Lisa Jackson Atkins, Stump's longtime chief of staff, whom Stump had endorsed as his successor. Atkins had long been very visible in the district (in contrast to her more low-key boss) to the point that many thought she was the district's representative. Franks narrowly defeated Atkins in the seven-candidate Republican primary, 28–26%, a difference of just 797 votes. He won the November 2002 general election, defeating Democrat Randy Camacho, 60–37%.

==== 2004 ====
Franks faced competition in the Republican primary from the more moderate businessman Rick Murphy. Franks defeated him 64–36%. He won re-election to a second term, by defeating Camacho in a rematch, 59–38%.

==== 2006 ====
He won re-election to a third term with 59% of the vote.

==== 2008 ====
He won re-election to a fourth term with 59% of the vote.

==== 2010 ====
Franks was again challenged in the Republican primary. However, he easily defeated Charles Black, 81–19%. He won re-election to a fifth term with 65% of the vote.

==== 2012 ====
For his first five terms, Franks represented a vast district encompassing most of northwestern Arizona from the West Valley to the California border, including Lake Havasu City and the Grand Canyon. While the district appeared rural, the bulk of its population was in the West Valley, which had dominated the district since it was drawn into what was then the 3rd in 1967. The district appeared to be gerrymandered because of a narrow tendril connecting the Hopi reservation to the rest of the district. However, due to longstanding disputes between the Hopi and Navajo, it had long been believed the two tribes should be in separate districts.

However, after the 2010 census and redistricting, Franks' district was renumbered as the 8th District, and reduced to essentially the Maricopa County portion of the old 2nd. It included most of Glendale, as well as all of Sun City and Surprise, almost all of Peoria, and much of western Phoenix. As evidence of how much the West Valley had dominated the district, Franks retained 92 percent of his former constituents, even as he lost 85 percent of his old district's land. He was challenged in the Republican primary by Tony Passalacqua, whom Franks defeated easily, 83–17%. The new 8th was no less Republican than the old 2nd, and Franks won a sixth term with 63% of the vote.

==== 2014 ====
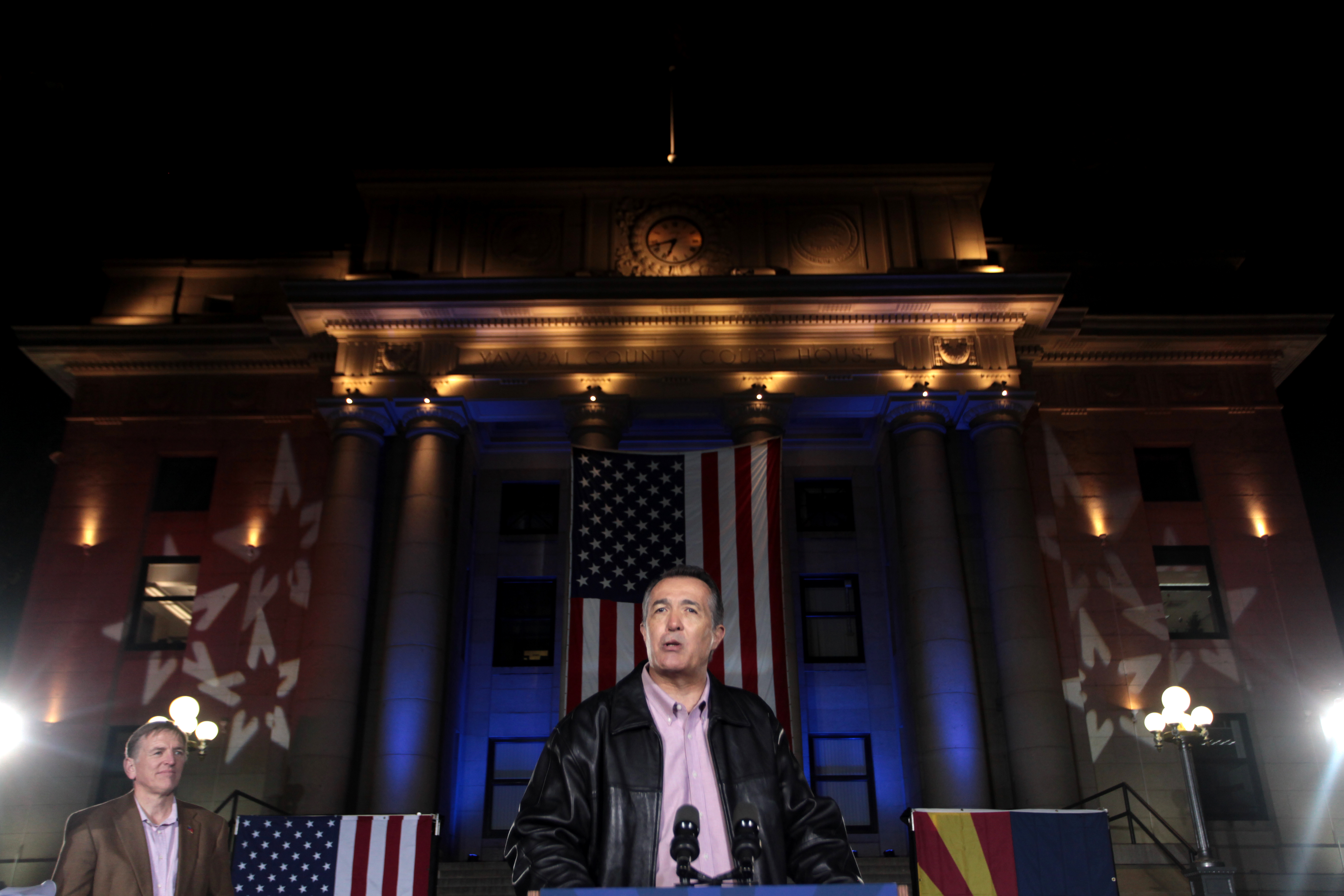
Congressman Franks speaking at a rally in November 2014

Franks won his party's election in the Republican primary on August 26, 2014. Facing no Democratic opponent in the general election, Franks won re-election with over 75% of the vote over Stephen Dolgos, the Americans Elect candidate.

==== 2016 ====
Franks faced a Republican primary challenge from Clair Van Steenwyck, but won renomination with over 71% of the vote. He again faced no Democratic opponent in the general election, and defeated Arizona Green Party nominee Mark Salazar 68.5%–31.5%.

==== 2024 ====
After his resignation, Franks was succeeded by fellow Republican Debbie Lesko in a special election. Lesko would retire ahead of the 2024 election, leaving the seat open. On November 1, 2023, Franks announced he would run in the Republican primary to regain his old seat. He finished in fourth place, and the primary was won by Abraham Hamadeh.

=== Political positions ===
In 2009, National Journal ranked Franks among the "most conservative" members of the U.S. House of Representatives. He was a member of the Republican Study Committee.

==== Online gaming ====
In 2006, he cosponsored H.R. 4411, the Goodlatte-Leach Internet Gambling Prohibition Act and H.R. 4777, the Internet Gambling Prohibition Act.

==== Homeland security ====
On October 14, 2009, Franks joined with three other members of Congress in calling for the investigation of the Council on American-Islamic Relations (CAIR) over allegations of trying to plant "spies" based on a CAIR memo indicating that the group planned to "develop national initiatives such as Lobby day" and place "Muslim interns in Congressional offices." The request followed the publication of the book Muslim Mafia. Representative Sue Myrick had written the foreword, which characterized CAIR as subversive and aligned with terrorists. CAIR countered that these initiatives are extensively used by all advocacy groups and accused Franks and his colleagues of intending to intimidate American Muslims who "take part in the political process and exercise their rights."

==== Taxes ====
Franks signed the Taxpayer Protection Pledge. In 2010, Franks voted against the Patient Protection and Affordable Care Act. He received high approval ratings from the Small Business and Entrepreneurship Council. In November 2011, he voted to pass H.R. 2930, which authorizes crowdfunding for small businesses.

In 2009, Franks signed a pledge sponsored by Americans for Prosperity promising to vote against any global warming legislation that would raise taxes.

==== Criticism of the Obama administration ====
He opposed the Patient Protection and Affordable Care Act, saying "the thought of Americans' health care decisions being put into the hands of an unimaginably large bureaucracy is a frightening prospect." He was not supported by American Public Health Association or the Children's Health Fund.

In September 2009, he called President Barack Obama an "enemy of humanity" with his spokesperson later clarifying the remarks were in response to Obama's position on abortion.

"A president that has lost his way that badly, that has no ability to see the image of God in these little fellow human beings, if he can't do that right, then he has no place in any station of government and we need to realize that he is an enemy of humanity," Franks said to the "How to Take Back America" conference.

==== Abortion ====
In a 2010 interview, discussing the legacy of slavery which Franks described as a "crushing mark on America's soul," the congressman said, "Half of all black children are aborted. Far more of the African American community is being devastated by the policies of today than were being devastated by the policies of slavery."

In June 2013, he proposed a bill that would ban abortions after 20 weeks, without exceptions for rape and incest. He stirred controversy when saying that "the incidents of rape resulting in pregnancy are very low." He later clarified, "Pregnancies from rape that result in abortion after the beginning of the sixth month are very rare." The bill passed by a vote of 228–196.

In 2017, he again proposed the same bill that would ban abortions after 20 weeks without exceptions for rape and incest. The bill passed by a vote of 237–189.

Franks presided over a hearing to ban abortions after 20 weeks in the District of Columbia, in which he did not allow D.C.'s lone delegate and Member of Congress, Congresswoman Eleanor Holmes Norton, to testify. In doing so, he said Congress has the authority to "exercise exclusive legislation in all cases whatsoever" in the District, even though the heavily Democratic district is strongly opposed to the ban.

Franks has also been involved in the founding of a crisis pregnancy center in Tempe, Arizona. In the past, Franks has picketed abortion clinics but has ceased to do so stating in a June 2013 interview that "It became clear to me that I could be more effective by trying to do something to light a candle rather than curse the darkness."

==== Other ====
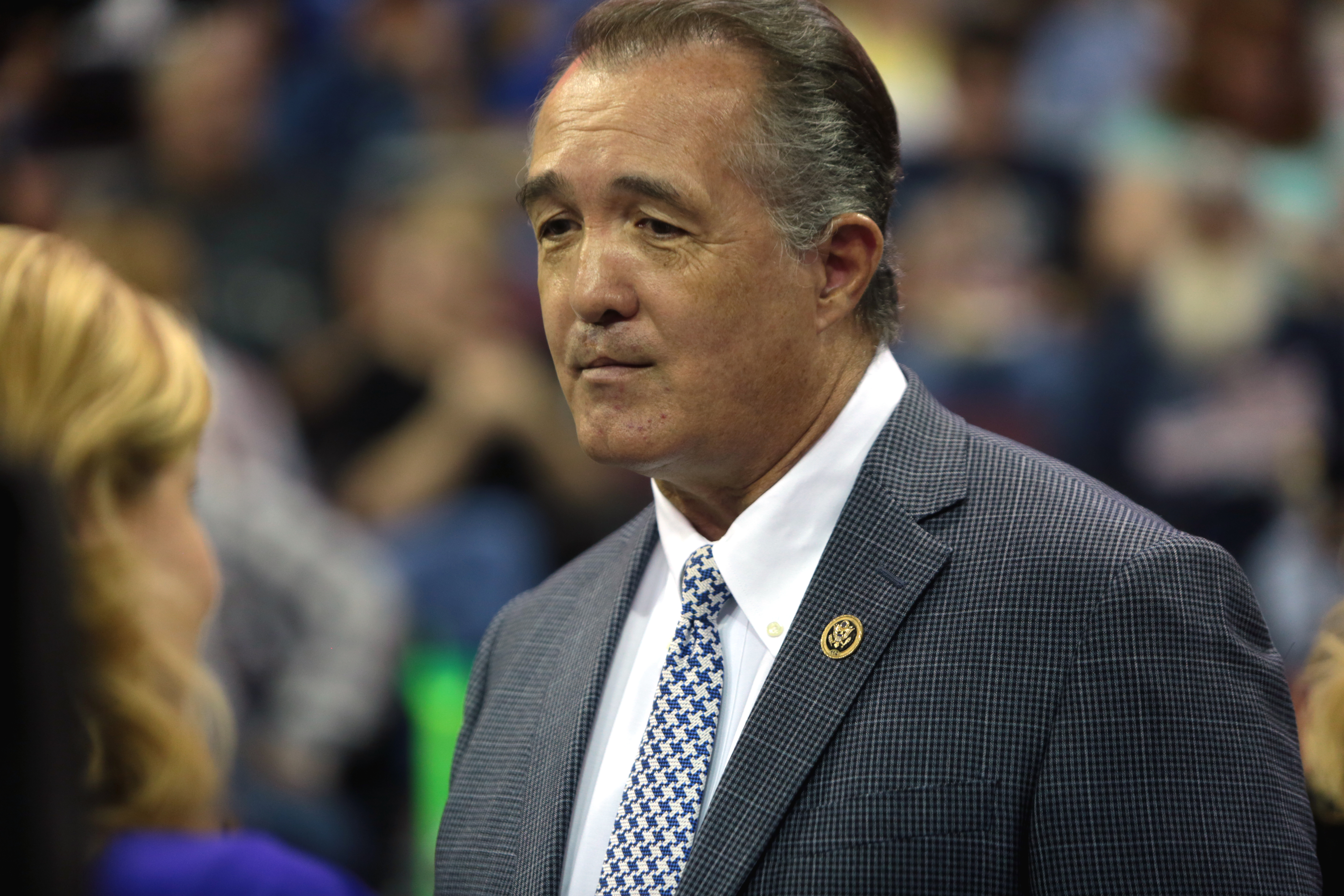
Franks in 2016

During the 2008 campaign, Franks stated that he is skeptical about global warming and other commonly accepted theories supported by the scientific community. Franks is a past chairman of the Children's Hope Scholarship Foundation.

He opposes same-sex marriage.

Franks opposes gun control. The interest group Gun Owners of America has given Franks high approval ratings. In 2011, he voted to pass the National Right-to-Carry Reciprocity Act. Franks has also been active with Operation Smile.

==== Sexual harassment scandal and resignation ====
In December 2017, two of Franks' former aides accused him of sexually harassing them by pushing them to serve as surrogate mothers for his wife. In response, the House Ethics Committee announced that it would investigate allegations of sexual harassment against Franks.

On December 7, 2017—hours after the ethics investigation became public—Franks announced he would resign from the House on January 31, 2018. In a statement, Franks acknowledged discussing surrogacy with the aides and acknowledged that he inadvertently discussed it in a manner that was "insensitive," and regretted "having caused distress" to his former aides. While he denied the other allegations, he stated that "the current cultural and media climate" made a fair hearing impossible, and was resigning to prevent harm to "those things I love most." The following day, after his wife was admitted to the hospital, Franks announced his immediate resignation.

It later emerged that one of the aides' friends advised the aide to seek counsel from Traditional Values Coalition president Andrea Lafferty. When the aide was ready to come forward, Lafferty arranged a meeting with staffers from House Speaker Paul Ryan's office. Lafferty told CNN that she was outraged that "somebody who purports to be a conservative and a Christian" could behave in the manner that Franks allegedly behaved. According to a statement from Ryan, his general counsel interviewed the ex-aide on November 28, during which she mentioned the second aide's claims of misconduct. After Ryan's staff was able to corroborate the second aide's claims, Ryan was briefed on November 29. On November 30, Ryan called Franks in and confronted him with the allegations. After Franks "did not deny" the allegations, Ryan referred the matter to the Ethics Committee and demanded Franks' resignation. Subsequent talks between Ryan and Franks led to Franks tendering his resignation on December 7. In his statement, Ryan said that he found the aides' claims "credible," and acted in accordance with his duty to ensure "a safe workplace in the House."

=== Committee assignments ===
- Committee on Armed Services
  - Subcommittee on Strategic Forces
  - Subcommittee on Emerging Threats and Capabilities
- Committee on the Judiciary
  - Subcommittee on Courts, Commercial and Administrative Law
  - Subcommittee on the Constitution (Chair)

=== Caucus memberships ===
- DUI Caucus
- Congressional Hispanic Conference
- Education Freedom Caucus
- Human Rights Caucus
- India Caucus
- Israel Allies Caucus
- International Religious Freedom Caucus
- Liberty Caucus
- Tea Party Caucus
- Congressional Constitution Caucus
- Working Group on Judicial Accountability
- Working Group on Waste, Fraud, and Abuse

=== Legislation sponsored ===
- Congressman Franks sponsored into law The Critical Infrastructure Protection Act to protect America's critical infrastructure including protecting the electric grid against natural and weaponized electromagnetic pulse (EMP).
- On April 9, 2013, Franks introduced the Keep the Promise Act of 2013 (H.R. 1410; 113th Congress). If enacted, the bill would prevent the Arizona Native American tribe Tohono O'odham from building a planned casino in the Phoenix metropolitan area. The Keep the Promise Act of 2013 would prohibit Class II and III gaming on land within the Phoenix, Arizona, metropolitan area that is acquired after April 9, 2013, by the Secretary of the Interior in trust for the benefit of an Indian tribe. The bill would terminate that prohibition on January 1, 2027.

Opponents of the bill gave several reasons for their opposition. Representative Tom McClintock (R-CA) was opposed to the bill because it would hurt job creation and break a promise to the Tohono O'odham tribe. Tohono O’odham Nation Chairman Ned Norris Jr. objected to the bill because it is "special interest legislation" that creates a "no-competition zone" for the two tribes that already have casinos in that area.

Proponents of the bill included Gila River Indian Community Gov. Gregory Mendoza, who was in favor of the bill because he believes that the compact not to build more casinos needs to be respected. The Tohono O’odham Nation argues that federal rules allow casinos on reservation land created after October 17, 1988, if they are part of a settlement of a land claim. The Nation claims the West Valley land is partial replacement to settle a claim for the 10,000 acres (40 km^{2}) of its lands that were flooded as a result of the construction of the Painted Rock Dam on the Gila River.

- On July 14, 2017, Franks introduced Amendment No. 13 to the National Defense Authorization Act of 2018. The amendment called for a database surveying American Muslim leaders to identify violent and "unorthodox" strains of Islam. Critics of the amendment, including, most notably, Minnesota Democratic congressman Keith Ellison, the first Muslim elected to the United States Congress, repudiated the amendment as an attempt to subject one religion to special scrutiny. Ultimately, the amendment was defeated 217–208, with 27 House Republicans joining all the House Democrats in voting in opposition.
- in Congress, Franks was a chief opponent of abortion. He was the original sponsor of the Born-Alive Abortion Survivors Protection Act, which began in 2017 on his initiative and then continued in 2019 thanks to Senator Ben Sasse; The Prenatal Nondiscrimination Act; and the Pain-Capable Unborn Child Protection Act. All three bills passed the U.S. House of Representatives with the latter becoming the first bill in history to pass either chamber of Congress affording affirmative protection to a fetus.

== Electoral history ==
Arizona House of Representatives 20th District Election, 1984
Party	Candidate	Votes	%
Democratic	Debbie McCune (incumbent)	15,575	30.7
Republican	Trent Franks	13,166	25.9
Democratic	Glenn Davis (incumbent)	12,937	25.5
Republican	Richard Adams	9,125	18.0

Arizona House of Representatives 20th District Election, 1986
Party	Candidate	Votes	%
Democratic	Debbie McCune (incumbent)	13,866	32.2
Democratic	Bobby Raymond	10,258	23.9
Republican	Trent Franks (incumbent)	10,063	23.4
Republican	Georgia Hargan	8,825	20.5

Arizona's 4th Congressional District Republican Primary Election, 1994
Party	Candidate	Votes	%
Republican	John Shadegg	26,489	43.1
Republican	Trent Franks	18,574	30.2
Republican	Jim Bruner	12,718	20.7
Republican	Joan Jugloff	3,678	6.0

Arizona's 2nd Congressional District Republican Primary Election, 2002
Party	Candidate	Votes	%
Republican	Trent Franks	14,749	27.7
Republican	Lisa Atkins	13,952	26.2
Republican	John Keegan	10,560	19.8
Republican	Scott Bundgaard	8,701	16.3
Republican	Dusko Jovicic	3,805	7.1
Republican	Mike Schaefer	933	1.8
Republican	Dick Hensky	618	1.2

Arizona's 2nd Congressional District Republican Primary Election, 2004
Party	Candidate	Votes	%
Republican	Trent Franks (inc.)	45,261	63.6
Republican	Rick Murphy	25,871	36.4

Arizona's 2nd Congressional District Republican Primary Election, 2010
Party	Candidate	Votes	%
Republican	Trent Franks (inc.)	81,252	80.9
Republican	Charles Black	19,220	19.1

Arizona's 2nd congressional district: Results 2002–2010
Year	Democratic	Votes	Pct	Republican	Votes	Pct	3rd party	Party	Votes	Pct		3rd party	Party	Votes	Pct
2002	Randy Camacho	61,217	36.6%	Trent Franks	100,359	59.9%	Edward R. Carlson	Libertarian	5,919	3.5%	*				
2004	Randy Camacho	107,406	38.5%	Trent Franks	165,260	59.2%	Powell Gammill	Libertarian	6,625	2.4%	*				
2006	John Thrasher	89,671	38.9%	Trent Franks	135,150	58.6%	Powell Gammill	Libertarian	5,734	2.5%	*				
2008	John Thrasher	125,611	37.2%	Trent Franks	200,914	59.4%	Powell Gammill	Libertarian	7,882	2.3%		William Crum	Green	3,616	1.1%
2010	John Thrasher	82,891	31.1%	Trent Franks	173,173	64.9%	Powell Gammill	Libertarian	10,820	4.1%	*				

Arizona's 8th Congressional District Republican Primary Election, 2012
Party	Candidate	Votes	%
Republican	Trent Franks (inc.)	57,257	83.2
Republican	Tony Passalacqua	11,572	16.8
Republican/Write-in	Helmuth Hack	18	nil

Arizona's 8th congressional district: Results 2012
Year	Democratic	Votes	Pct	Republican	Votes	Pct	3rd party	Party	Votes	Pct
2012	Gene Scharer	95,635	35.1%	Trent Franks	172,809	63.3%	Stephen Dolgos	Americans Elect	4,347	1.6%

Arizona's 8th Congressional District Republican Primary Election, 2014
Party	Candidate	Votes	%
Republican	Trent Franks (inc.)	53,771	73.3
Republican	Clair Van Steenwyk	19,629	26.7
Total		73,400	100

Arizona's 8th Congressional District Election, 2014
Party	Candidate	Votes	%
Republican	Trent Franks (inc.)	128,710	75.8%
Americans Elect	Stephen Dolgos	41,066	24.2%
Total		169,776	100

Arizona's 8th Congressional District Republican Primary Election, 2016
Party	Candidate	Votes	%
Republican	Trent Franks (inc.)	59,042	71.1
Republican	Clair Van Steenwyk	24,042	28.9
Total votes		83,084	100

Arizona’s 8th congressional district, 2016
Party	Candidate	Votes	%
Republican	Trent Franks (inc)	204,942	68.5
Green	Mark Salazar	93,954	31.5
Republican	Hayden Keener III (write-in)	75	nil
Total votes		298,971	100

== Personal life ==
Franks and his wife, Josephine, have been married since 1980; they are members of the North Phoenix Baptist Church. Franks' wife, Josephine, is an immigrant.

U.S. House of Representatives
Preceded by Ed Pastor	Member of the U.S. House of Representatives from Arizona's 2nd congressional district 2003–2013	Succeeded by Ron Barber
Preceded by Ron Barber	Member of the U.S. House of Representatives from Arizona's 8th congressional district 2013–2017	Succeeded by Debbie Lesko
U.S. order of precedence (ceremonial)
Preceded by Steve Pearce as Former U.S. Representative	Order of precedence of the United States as Former U.S. Representative	Succeeded by William J. Green III as Former U.S. Representative
