= Mid-America Regional Council =

Planning and intergovernmental organization in Kansas City

Metropolitan planning organization, Council of Governments overview
- Formed: 1972
- Jurisdiction: Kansas City metropolitan area
- Metropolitan planning organization, Council of Governments executive: David Warm, Executive Director
- Website: www.marc.org

The Mid-America Regional Council (MARC) is a nonprofit association of city and county governments and the Metropolitan Planning Organization (MPO) for the bistate Kansas City region. Governed by a board of directors made up of local elected officials, MARC serves nine counties and 119 cities.

MARC works on a wide range of programs and initiatives, including efficient transportation and quality places, healthy environment, competitive economy, effective local government, safe and secure communities, thriving older adults and communities and quality early learning. The organization provides a forum for the region to work together to advance social, economic and environmental progress.

MARC is funded by federal, state and private grants, local contributions and earned income. A major portion of MARC's budget is passed through to local governments and other agencies for programs and services.

== About the region ==
The Mid-America Regional Council serves the nine county Kansas City metropolitan area, including Cass, Clay, Jackson, Platte and Ray Counties in Missouri and Johnson, Leavenworth, Miami and Wyandotte counties in Kansas. There are 119 separate city governments within the region. Estimated population of the region in 2017 was 2 million people.

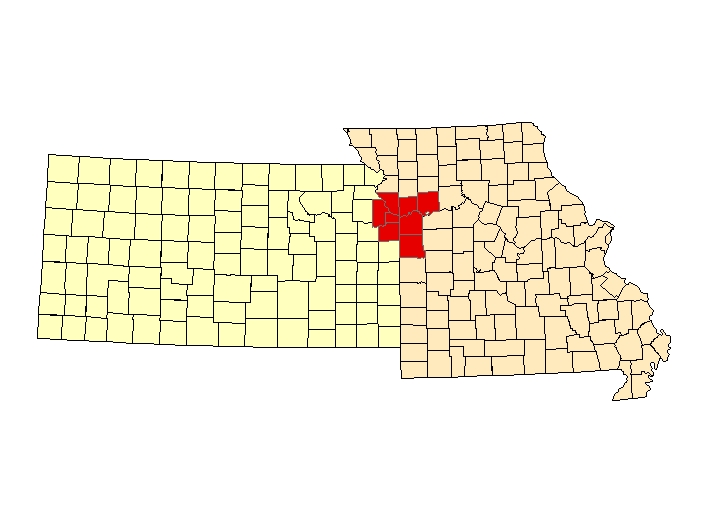
MARC Region

== Location ==
801 Pennsylvania Ave, Suite 400
Kansas City, Missouri 64105
