= Emanuel Cleaver =

American pastor and politician (born 1944)

The Reverend Emanuel Cleaver
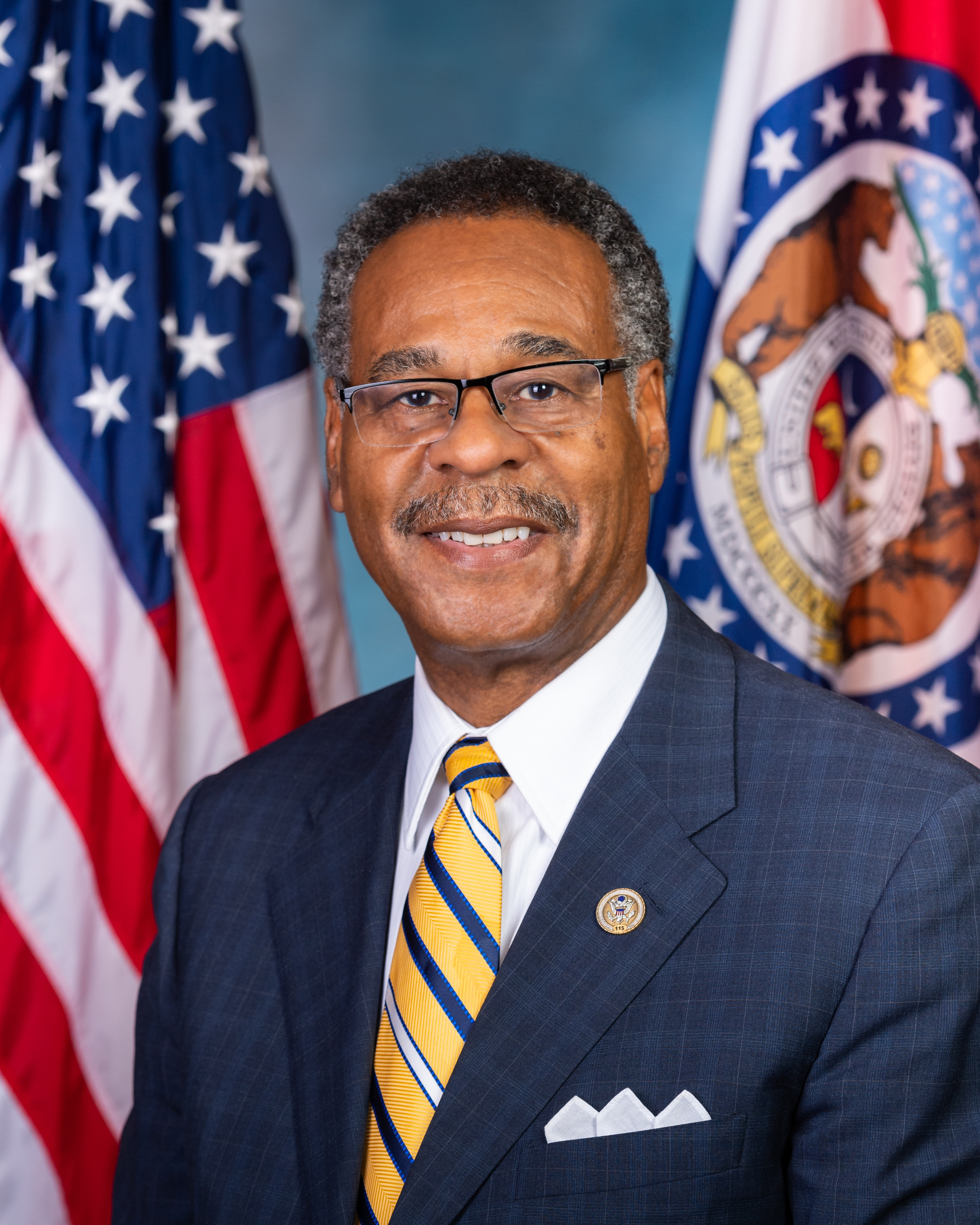
- Official portrait, 2018

Chair of the Congressional Black Caucus
- In office January 3, 2011 – January 3, 2013
- Preceded by: Barbara Lee
- Succeeded by: Marcia Fudge

Member of the U.S. House of Representatives from Missouri's 5th district
- Incumbent
- Assumed office January 3, 2005
- Preceded by: Karen McCarthy

51st Mayor of Kansas City
- In office 1991–1999
- Preceded by: Richard Berkley
- Succeeded by: Kay Barnes

Personal details
- Born: Emanuel Cleaver II; October 26, 1944 (age 81) Waxahachie, Texas, U.S.
- Party: Democratic
- Spouse: Dianne Cleaver
- Children: 4
- Education: Prairie View A&M University (BS); Saint Paul School of Theology (MDiv)
- Website: House website
- Cleaver's voice Cleaver presents the Congressional Black Caucus substitute for the FY2013 federal budget. Recorded March 28, 2012

Emanuel Cleaver II (born October 26, 1944) is an American politician and United Methodist pastor serving as the U.S. representative for Missouri's 5th congressional district since 2005. A member of the Democratic Party, he previously served as the 51st mayor of Kansas City, Missouri, from 1991 to 1999, becoming the first Black person to hold that role.

Cleaver represents a district that primarily consists of the inner ring of the Kansas City metropolitan area, including nearly all of Kansas City and some of its suburbs in Clay and Jackson counties, including North Kansas City, Gladstone, Independence, Lee's Summit, and some of Blue Springs. He chaired the Congressional Black Caucus from 2011 to 2013.

In his 11th term in Congress as of 2025, Cleaver previously served three terms on the Kansas City Council from 1979 to 1991, until he was elected mayor, serving two terms from 1991 to 1999.

== Early life, education, and career ==
Emanuel Cleaver II was born on October 26, 1944, in Waxahachie, Texas. He grew up in public housing in Wichita Falls, Texas. He graduated from Prairie View A&M University, where he was a member of Alpha Phi Alpha fraternity, in 1972. Cleaver then moved to Kansas City, Missouri, where he founded a branch of the Southern Christian Leadership Conference and received a Master of Divinity degree from St. Paul School of Theology.

Cleaver was the pastor at the St. James United Methodist Church in Kansas City, Missouri, from 1972 to 2009.

== Kansas City councilman and mayor ==
Cleaver served as a Kansas City councilman from 1979 to 1991 and as mayor of Kansas City from 1991 until 1999. He was Kansas City's first African American mayor.

David Helling, an opinion columnist for the Kansas City Star, wrote of Cleaver's tenure as mayor: "Kansas City's first African-American mayor defined the modern concept of the job: a professional staff, high visibility and a clear agenda. He was also a moral leader. His speech at a local rally after the Rodney King verdict averted a riot and was his finest moment. Yet Cleaver's actual record as mayor is spotty. Tax and spending initiatives floundered at the polls, and City Hall scandal was common. The crime rate was far too high."

Cleaver is a cousin of exiled Kansas City Black Panther leader Pete O'Neal. In 1997, Cleaver unsuccessfully attempted to obtain a pardon for O'Neal from President Bill Clinton. Cleaver is also a cousin of the late Eldridge Cleaver, another prominent figure in the Black Panther Party.

== U.S. House of Representatives ==
=== Committee assignments ===
For the 119th Congress:

- Committee on Financial Services
  - Subcommittee on Capital Markets
  - Subcommittee on Housing and Insurance (ranking member)

=== Caucus membership ===
- Congressional Black Caucus
- Congressional Civility Caucus, (chair)
- Congressional Midwest Crossroads Caucus, (co-chair)
- International Religious Freedom Caucus, (vice chair)
- Working Group for a Working Congress, (chair)
- Congressional Sustainable Investment Caucus, (co-founder)

=== Tenure ===
He has brought many federal tax dollars back to Kansas City.

Cleaver has called for ethics charges against fellow U.S. Representatives Charlie Rangel and Maxine Waters to be dropped, saying, "The process has been tainted."

After the compromise Budget Control Act deal had been reached to resolve the 2011 debt-ceiling crisis, Cleaver called the deal a "sugar-coated Satan sandwich".

On September 11, 2014, around 2:50 a.m., what appeared to be a Molotov cocktail was thrown through the window of Cleaver's Kansas City office. He was in Washington D.C. at the time and no staff members were present during the attack.

On December 18, 2019, Cleaver voted for both articles of impeachment against President Donald Trump and is one of only two Missouri House members to do so, along with Lacy Clay.

== Political campaigns ==
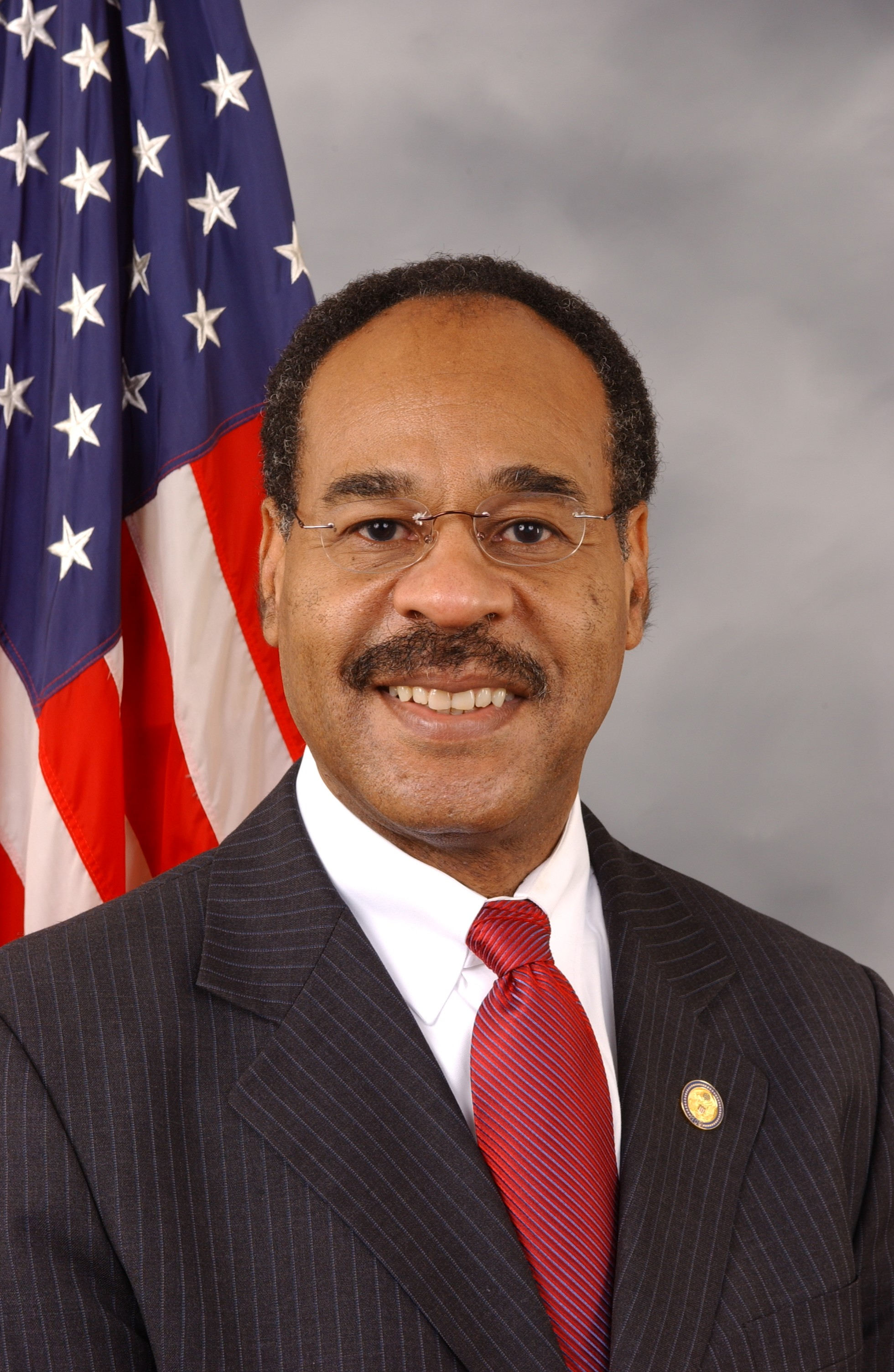
Cleaver during the 110th Congress

In late 2003, Karen McCarthy, who had represented the 5th congressional district since 1995, announced her retirement. Though he served in city government for 20 years, including eight as mayor, Cleaver initially posted weak numbers in the Democratic primary and general elections, but defeated former Clinton Administration official Jamie Metzl in the Democratic primary, 60%-40%. In the general election, Republican Jeanne Patterson made the race far more competitive than conventional wisdom would suggest for the district, which has long been reckoned as Missouri's second-most Democratic district, behind the St. Louis-based 1st. The Democrats have held this seat for all but eight years since 1909, and without interruption since 1949. McCarthy won 65% of the vote in 2002.

=== 2008 Democratic presidential primary election ===
During the 2008 Democratic presidential primaries, Cleaver endorsed Hillary Clinton. He claimed that African American superdelegates who supported Clinton were subjected to harassment, threatened with primary opponents and called "Uncle Tom." He said they were told, "'You’re not black if you’re not supporting Barack Obama' … It's ugly." On March 30, 2008, Cleaver said he realized he was on the losing team: "Even though I don't expect the Kansas City Chiefs to beat the Indianapolis Colts, I cheer for the Kansas City Chiefs." According to BlackMissouri.com., U.S. Representative Jesse Jackson Jr. of Illinois asked Cleaver, "If it comes down to the last day and you're the only superdelegate? … Do you want to go down in history as the one to prevent a black from winning the White House?" Cleaver said, "I told him I'd think about it." Cleaver said during the primary he'd be shocked if Obama wasn't the next president but made clear he still supported Clinton until she suspended her bid.

== Political positions ==
Cleaver voted to provide Israel with support following the October 7 attacks.

== Electoral history ==
Kansas City Mayoral election, 1991
Party	Candidate	Votes	%
Nonpartisan	Emanuel Cleaver	50,204	53
Nonpartisan	Bob Lewellen	43,989	47

Kansas City Mayoral election, 1995
Party	Candidate	Votes	%
Nonpartisan	Emanuel Cleaver	51,057	55
Nonpartisan	Dan Cofran	41,024	45

2004 Election for U.S. Representative of Missouri's 5th Congressional District
Party	Candidate	Votes	%
Democratic	Emanuel Cleaver	161,727	55.19
Republican	Jeanne Patterson	123,431	42.12
Libertarian	Rick Bailie	5,827	1.99
Constitution	Darin Rodenberg	2,040	0.70

2006 Election for U.S. Representative of Missouri's 5th Congressional District
Party	Candidate	Votes	%
Democratic	Emanuel Cleaver	136,149	64.25
Republican	Jacob Turk	68,456	32.30
Libertarian	Randy Langkraehr	7,314	3.45

2008 Election for U.S. Representative of Missouri's 5th Congressional District
Party	Candidate	Votes	%
Democratic	Emanuel Cleaver	197,249	64.37
Republican	Jacob Turk	109,166	35.63

2010 Election for U.S. Representative of Missouri's 5th Congressional District
Party	Candidate	Votes	%
Democratic	Emanuel Cleaver	102,076	53.32
Republican	Jacob Turk	84,578	44.18
Libertarian	Randy Langkraehr	3,077	1.61
Constitution	Dave Lay	1,692	0.88

2012 Election for U.S. Representative of Missouri's 5th Congressional District
Party	Candidate	Votes	%
Democratic	Emanuel Cleaver	200,290	60.52
Republican	Jacob Turk	122,149	36.91
Libertarian	Randy Langkraehr	8,497	2.57
Write-In	Others	6	0.00

2014 Election for U.S. Representative of Missouri's 5th Congressional District
Party	Candidate	Votes	%
Democratic	Emanuel Cleaver	79,256	51.59
Republican	Jacob Turk	69,071	44.96
Libertarian	Roy Welborn	5,308	3.46

2016 Election for U.S. Representative of Missouri's 5th Congressional District
Party	Candidate	Votes	%
Democratic	Emanuel Cleaver	190,766	58.83
Republican	Jacob Turk	123,771	38.17
Libertarian	Roy Welborn	9,733	3.00

2018 Election for U.S. Representative of Missouri's 5th Congressional District
Party	Candidate	Votes	%
Democratic	Emanuel Cleaver	175,019	61.67
Republican	Jacob Turk	101,069	35.61
Libertarian	Alexander Howell	4,725	1.66
Green	Maurice Copeland	2,091	0.74
Constitution	E. C. Fredland	876	0.31
Write-in		5	0.00

2020 Election for U.S. Representative of Missouri's 5th Congressional District
Party	Candidate	Votes	%
Democratic	Emanuel Cleaver (incumbent)	207,180	58.79
Republican	Ryan Derks	135,934	38.57
Libertarian	Robin Dominick	9,272	2.63
Write-in		44	0.0

2022 Election for U.S. Representative of Missouri's 5th Congressional District
Party	Candidate	Votes	%
Democratic	Emanuel Cleaver (incumbent)	140,688	61.02
Republican	Jacob Turk	84,008	36.44
Libertarian	Robin Dominick	5,859	2.54

2024 Election for U.S. Representative of Missouri's 5th Congressional District
Party	Candidate	Votes	%
Democratic	Emanuel Cleaver (incumbent)	199,900	60.22
Republican	Sean Smith	120,957	36.44
Libertarian	Bill Wayne	6,658	2.01
Green	Michael Day	4,414	1.33

== Personal life ==
Emanuel Cleaver and his wife, Dianne, have four children. They reside in Kansas City.

In 2000, a road in Kansas City was renamed Emanuel Cleaver II Boulevard. The new route consisted of Brush Creek Blvd., E. 47th St., and the portion of Van Brunt Blvd. south of 31st St.

In 2012, Bank of America sued Emanuel and Dianne Cleaver and Cleaver Company LLC, alleging that the company had defaulted on a $1.46 million commercial real estate loan obtained a decade earlier for a Grandview car wash. In 2013, the lawsuit was settled. Cleaver's congressional wages were garnished to repay the money owed.

In June 2023, Emanuel Cleaver officiated the wedding of fellow Democratic Congressman and former House Majority Leader Steny Hoyer, and Elaine Kamarck, a senior fellow at the Brookings Institution.

== See also ==
- List of African-American United States representatives
- 2024 Kansas City metropolitan area rent strike

Political offices
Preceded by Richard Berkley	Mayor of Kansas City; 1991–1999	Succeeded by Kay Barnes
U.S. House of Representatives
Preceded by Karen McCarthy	Member of the U.S. House of Representatives from Missouri's 5th congressional district 2005–present	Incumbent
Preceded by Barbara Lee	Chair of the Congressional Black Caucus; 2011–2013	Succeeded by Marcia Fudge
U.S. order of precedence (ceremonial)
Preceded by Darrell Issa	United States representatives by seniority 44th	Succeeded by Jim Costa
Preceded by Virginia Foxx	Order of precedence of the United States	Succeeded by Debbie Wasserman Schultz
