= 1994 United States Senate election in Missouri =

- November 8, 1994
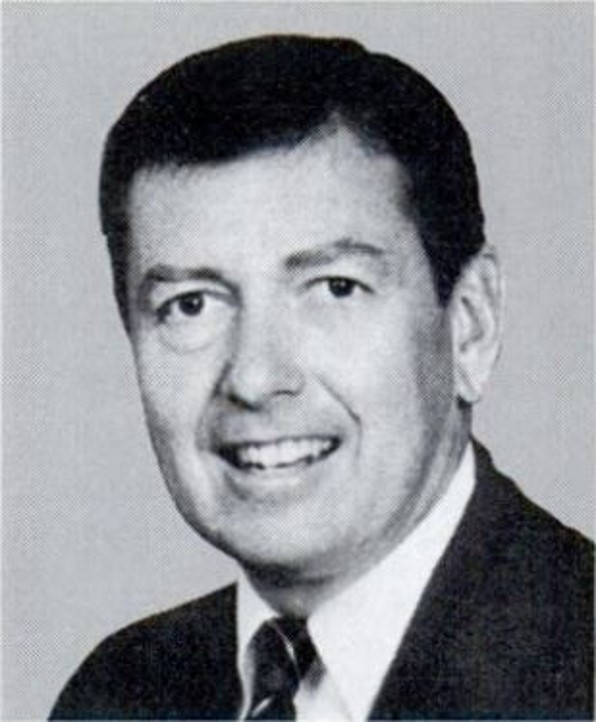

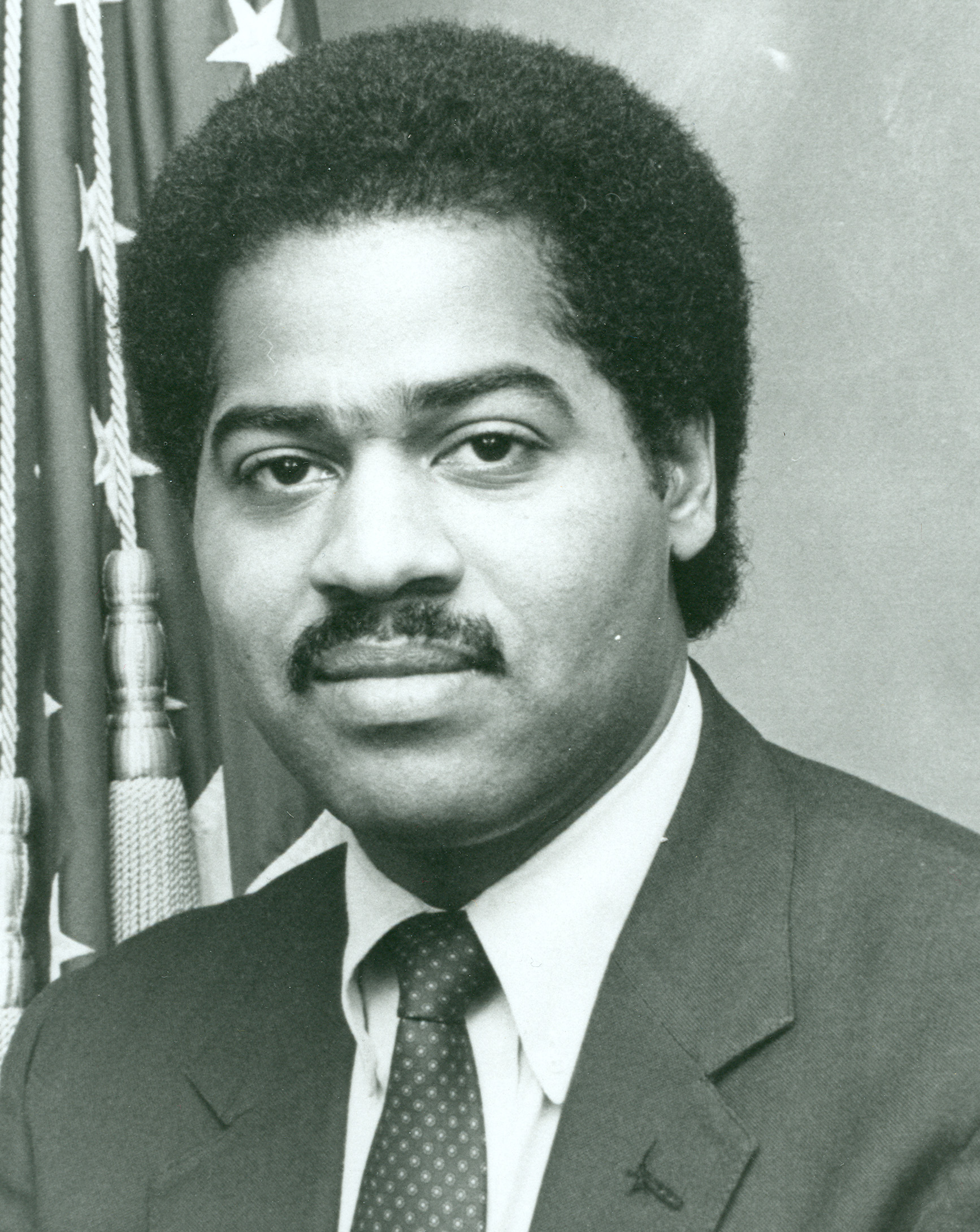
Nominee	John Ashcroft	Alan Wheat
Party	Republican	Democratic
Popular vote	1,060,149	633,697
Percentage	59.72%	35.70%
- County results Ashcroft: 40–50% 50–60% 60–70% 70–80% 80–90% Wheat: 60–70%
U.S. senator before election
John Danforth
Republican
Elected U.S. Senator
John Ashcroft
Republican

The 1994 United States Senate election in Missouri was held November 8, 1994. Incumbent Republican U.S. Senator John Danforth decided to retire and not seek re-election. Former Governor John Ashcroft won the Republican primary and faced Democratic Congressman Alan Wheat in the general election. Ashcroft defeated Wheat in a landslide, winning 60 percent of the vote to Wheat's 36 percent.

== Republican primary ==
=== Candidates ===
- John Ashcroft, former Governor of Missouri
- Joyce Lea, perennial candidate
- Joseph A. Schwan, retired federal employee
- Ronald G. Halstead, businessman
- Doug Jones, sporting goods store employee

=== Results ===
Republican primary results
Party	Candidate	Votes	%
Republican	John Ashcroft	260,076	83.18%
Republican	Joyce Lea	15,229	4.87%
Republican	Joseph A. Schwan	14,713	4.71%
Republican	Ronald G. Halstead	11,342	3.63%
Republican	Doug Jones	11,304	3.62%
Total votes		312,664	100.00%

== Democratic primary ==
=== Candidates ===
- Alan Wheat, U.S. Representative
- Marsha Murphy, Jackson County Executive
- Jim Thomas, Branson theater owner
- Gerald R. Ortbals, attorney
- Jim Hawley, tooling specialist
- Ned Sutherland, dentist
- Nichalas Clement, newspaper carrier

=== Results ===
Democratic primary results
Party	Candidate	Votes	%
Democratic	Alan Wheat	215,212	40.99%
Democratic	Marsha Murphy	200,980	38.28%
Democratic	Jim Thomas	60,219	11.47%
Democratic	Gerald R. Ortbals	23,699	4.51%
Democratic	Jim Hawley	10,347	1.97%
Democratic	Ned Sutherland	8,569	1.63%
Democratic	Nichalas Clement	5,983	1.14%
Total votes		525,009	100.00%

== Libertarian primary ==
=== Candidates ===
- Bill Johnson, construction contractor
- Rickey Jamerson, anti-tax activist

=== Results ===
Libertarian primary results
Party	Candidate	Votes	%
Libertarian	Bill Johnson	1,605	69.69%
Libertarian	Rickey Jamerson	698	30.31%
Total votes		2,303	100.00%

== General election ==
=== Results ===
1994 United States Senate election in Missouri
Party	Candidate	Votes	%	±%
Republican	John Ashcroft	1,060,149	59.72%	−7.98%
Democratic	Alan Wheat	633,697	35.70%	+3.95%
Libertarian	Bill Johnson	81,264	4.58%	+4.03%
Majority		426,452	24.02%	−11.93%
Total votes		1,775,110	100.00%	
Republican hold				

== See also ==
- 1994 United States Senate elections
