= 2004 Missouri Democratic presidential primary =

- February 3, 2004

88 Democratic National Convention delegates (74 pledged, 14 unpledged) The number of pledged delegates received is determined by the popular vote
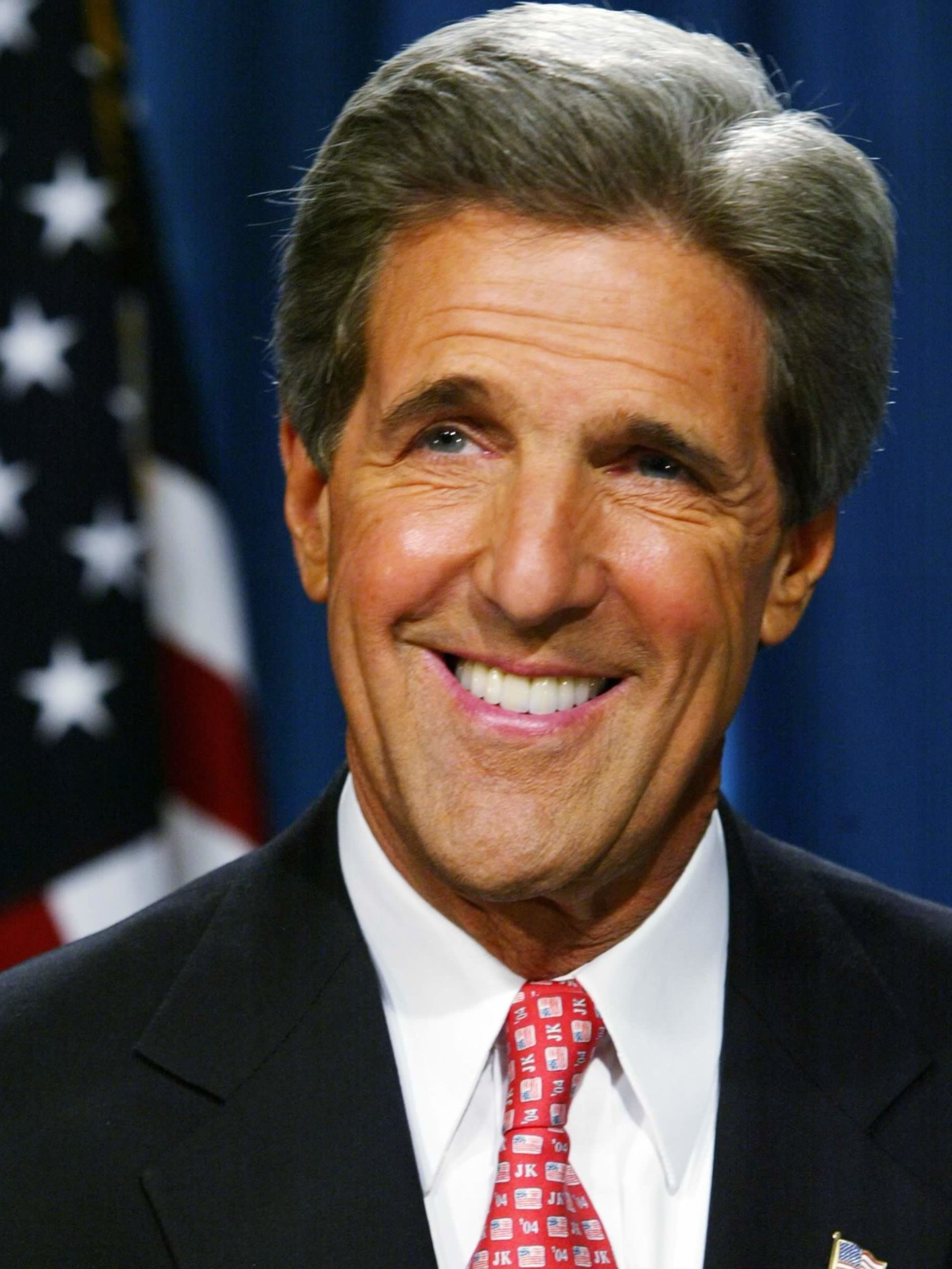

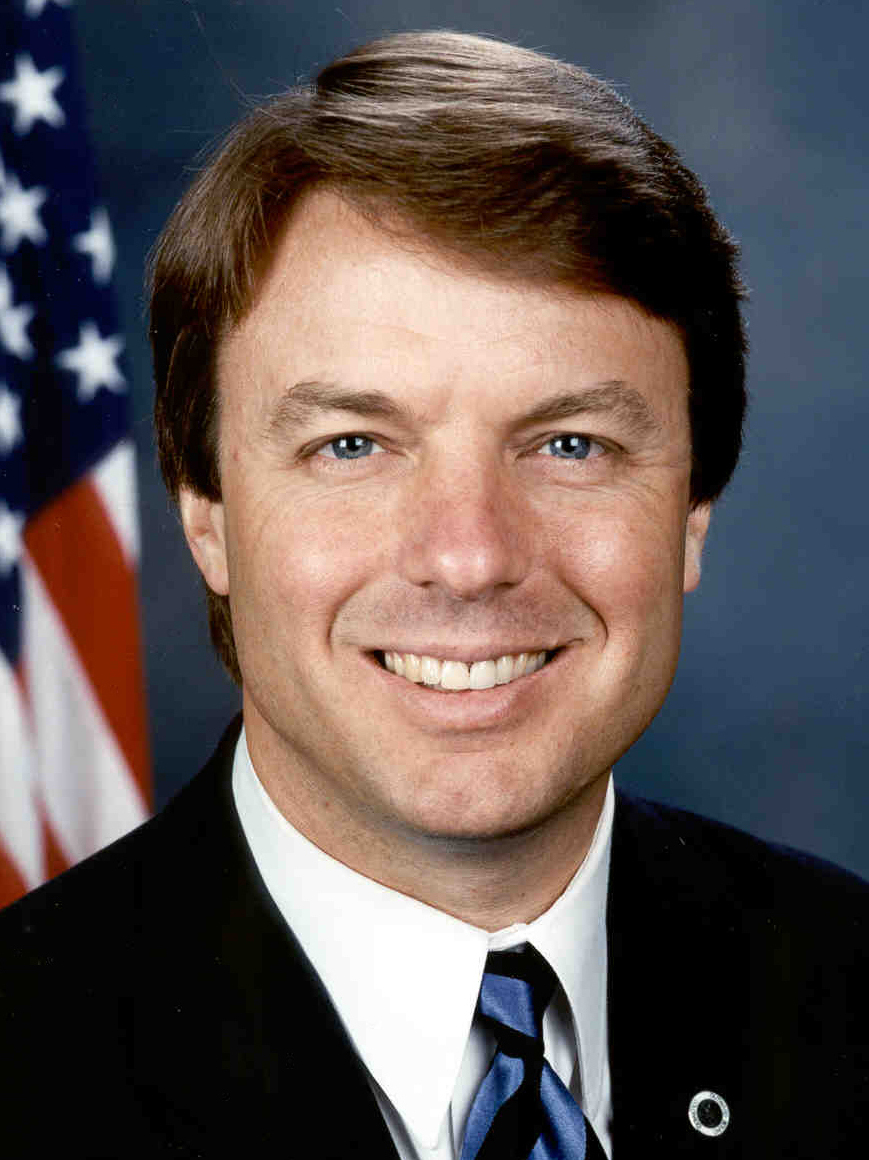

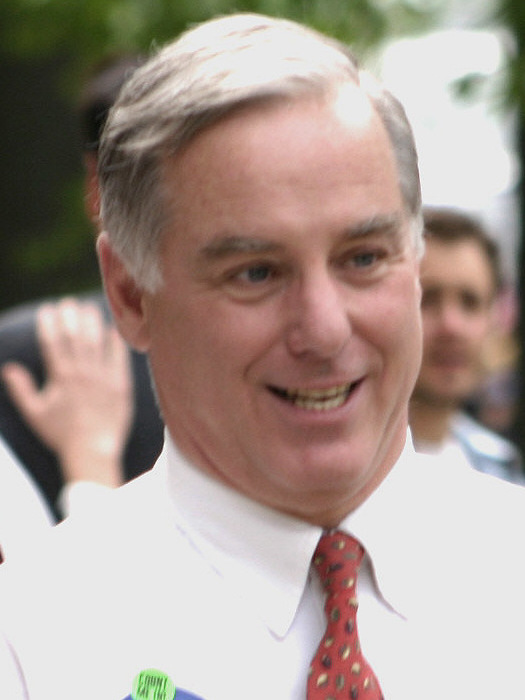

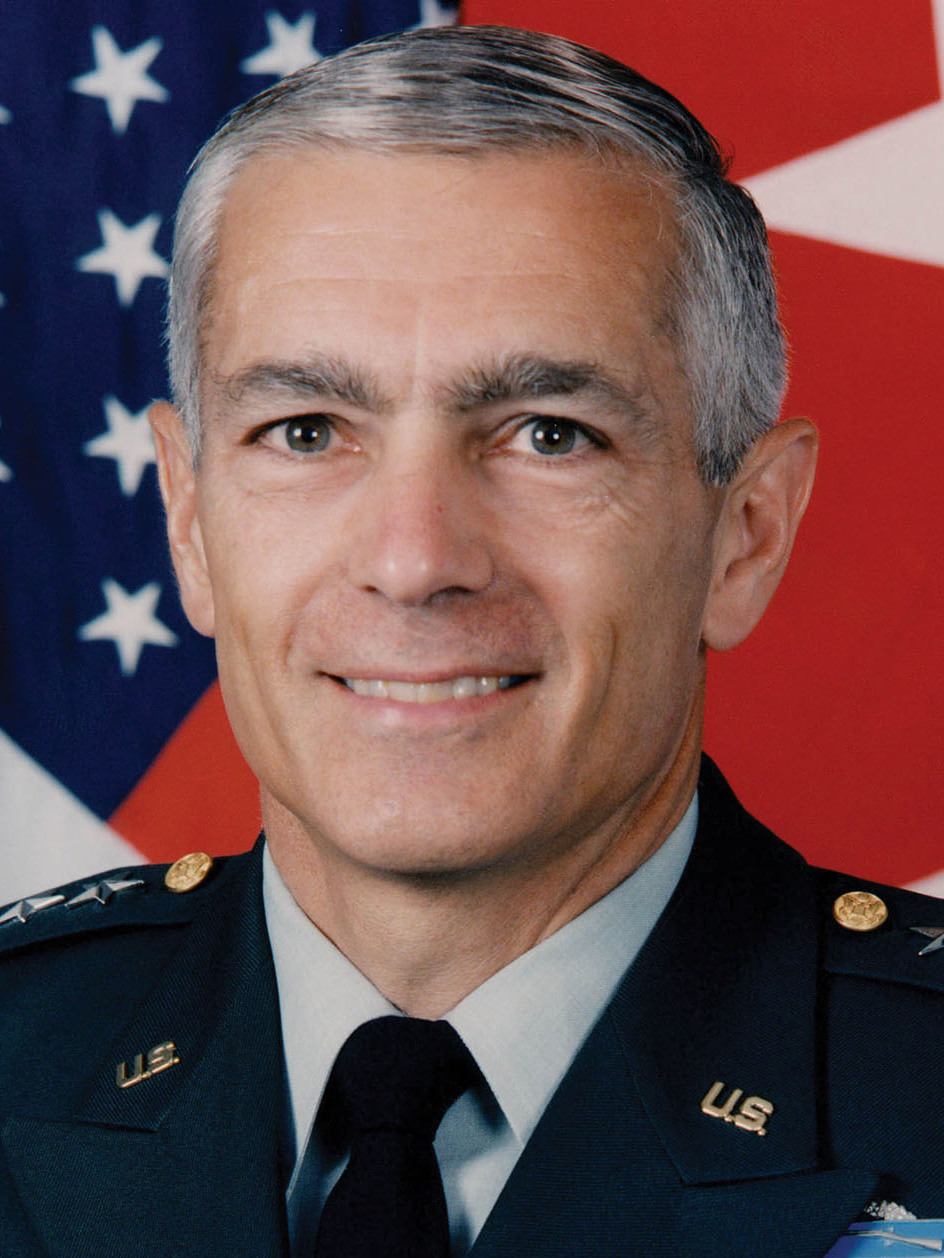

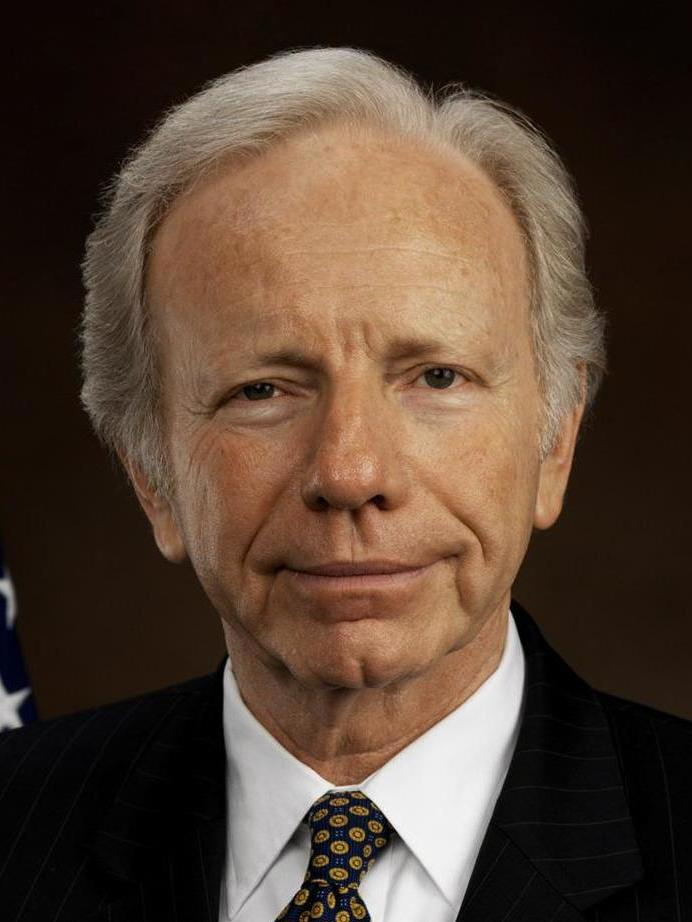

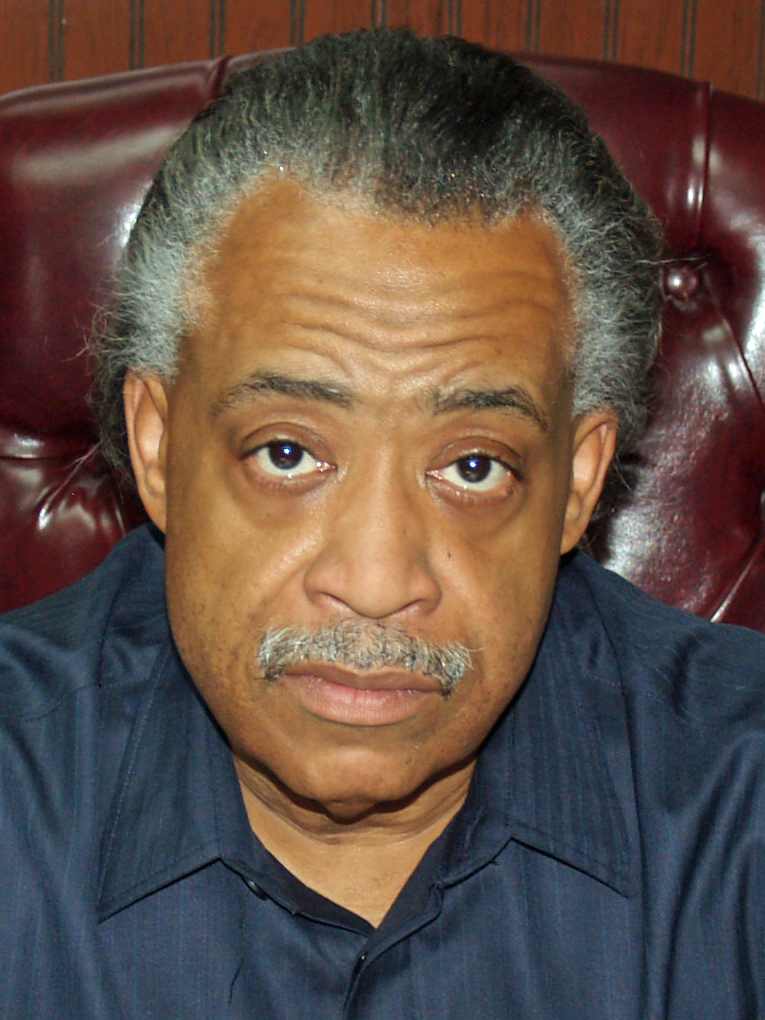
Candidate	John Kerry	John Edwards	Howard Dean
Home state	Massachusetts	North Carolina	Vermont
Delegate count	51	23	0
Popular vote	211,745	103,088	36,288
Percentage	50.62%	24.64%	8.67%
Candidate	Wesley Clark	Joe Lieberman	Al Sharpton
Home state	Arkansas	Connecticut	New York
Delegate count	0	0	0
Popular vote	18,340	14,727	14,308
Percentage	4.38%	3.52%	3.42%
- County results Kerry: 30–40% 40–50% 50–60% Edwards: 40–50%

The 2004 Missouri Democratic presidential primary on February 3, 2004 determined the recipient of the state's 88 delegates to the Democratic National Convention in the process to elect the democratic nominee for president of the United States. It was an open primary.

== Endorsements ==
Several major endorsements, such as the St. Louis Post-Dispatch, helped John Kerry to clinch the primary. John Edwards got former speaker of the house Jim Kreider and Buchanan County Auditor Susan Montee as endorsements. Governor Howard Dean got the endorsement of Chairman and CEO of King Hershey Richard A. King.

== Polling ==
Opinion polling
Candidate	22 January 2004	29 January 2004	29 January 2004	1 February 2004
John Kerry	25%	37%	44%	56%
John Edwards	9%	11%	14%	17%
Howard Dean	6%	7%	9%	9%
Wesley Clark	3%	6%	5%	6%
Al Sharpton	1%	2%	2%	4%
Joe Lieberman	2%	6%	5%	3%
Dennis Kucinich	1%	-	1%	-
Dick Gephardt	3%	-	1%	-

== Results ==
John Kerry won a majority of the Missouri vote. He won every congressional district and county except Knox County and Lawrence County, which Edwards won. Howard Dean received 9%, Clark got 4%, and several other candidates split the remainder.

2004 Missouri Democratic Presidential Primary Results
Party	Candidate	Votes	Percentage	Delegates
Democratic	John Kerry	211,745	50.62%	51
Democratic	John Edwards	103,088	24.64%	23
Democratic	Howard Dean	36,288	8.67%	0
Democratic	Wesley Clark	18,340	4.38%	0
Democratic	Joe Lieberman	14,727	3.52%	0
Democratic	Al Sharpton	14,308	3.42%	0
Democratic	Richard Gephardt (withdrawn)	8,281	1.98%	0
Democratic	Dennis Kucinich	4,875	1.17%	0
Democratic	Uncommitted	4,311	1.03%	0
Democratic	Carol Moseley-Braun (withdrawn)	1,088	0.26%	0
Democratic	Others	1,288	0.31%	0

== See also ==
- 2004 Missouri Republican presidential primary
