= 2004 Missouri Republican presidential primary =

- February 3, 2004

57 Republican National Convention delegates The number of pledged delegates received is determined by the popular vote

Candidate	George W. Bush	Uncommitted
Home state	Texas	–
Delegate count	57	0
Popular vote	117,007	3,830
Percentage	95.06%	3.11%

The 2004 Missouri Republican presidential primary on February 3, 2004 determined the recipient of 57 of the state's 58 delegates to the Republican National Convention in the process to elect the 44th president of the United States. It was an open primary.

== Results ==
2004 Missouri Republican presidential primary
Candidate	Votes	%	Delegates
George W. Bush (incumbent)	117,007	95.06	57
Uncommitted	3,830	3.11	0
Bill Wyatt	1,268	1.03	0
Blake Ashby	981	0.80	0
Total	123,086	100%	57

== See also ==
- 2004 Missouri Democratic presidential primary
- 2004 Republican Party presidential primaries
