= List of acronyms: K =

This list contains acronyms, initialisms, and pseudo-blends that begin with the letter K.

For the purposes of this list:

- acronym = an abbreviation pronounced as if it were a word, e.g., SARS = severe acute respiratory syndrome, pronounced to rhyme with cars
- initialism = an abbreviation pronounced wholly or partly using the names of its constituent letters, e.g., CD = compact disc, pronounced cee dee
- pseudo-blend = an abbreviation whose extra or omitted letters mean that it cannot stand as a true acronym, initialism, or portmanteau (a word formed by combining two or more words).

(a) = acronym, e.g.: SARS – (a) severe acute respiratory syndrome
(i) = initialism, e.g.: CD – (i) compact disc
(p) = pseudo-blend, e.g.: UNIFEM – (p) United Nations Development Fund for Women
(s) = symbol (none of the above, representing and pronounced as something else; for example: MHz – megahertz)

Some terms are spoken as either acronym or initialism, e.g., VoIP, pronounced both as voyp and V-O-I-P.

(Main list of acronyms)

- k – (s) kilo-
- K – (s) kelvin – potassium (Latin kalium) – tanker (aircraft designation code)

== K0–9 ==
- K9 – (p) Canine police unit

== KA ==
- ka – (s) Georgian language (ISO 639-1 code)
- kA – (s) kiloampere
- Ka – (s) Kamov Design Bureau
- KA – (i) knowledge acquisition – (s) Karnataka (Indian state code)
- KAF – (i/a) Kandahar Air Field
- KAGB (German law) – (i) Kapitalanlagegesetzbuch or the German Capital Investment Code
- kal – (s) Kalaallisut language (ISO 639-2 code)
- kan – (s) Kannada language (ISO 639-2 code)
- KANUKOKA – (a) Kalaallit Nunaanni Kommunit Kattuffiannit (Kalaallisut, "Greenlandic Communities Association")
- KARNAC – (a) Knowledge Aided Retrieval in Activity Context
- KARR – (a) Knight automated roving robot (Knight Rider character)
- kas – (s) Kashmiri language (ISO 639-2 code)
- kat – (s) Georgian language (ISO 639-2 code)
- KATUSA – (a) Korean augmentation to United States Army
- kau – (s) Kanuri language (ISO 639-2 code)
- kaz – (s) Kazakh language (ISO 639-2 code)
- KAZ – (s) Kazakhstan (ISO 3166 trigram)

== KB ==
- KBE – (i) Knight Commander of the Order of the British Empire
- KBO – (i) Kuiper Belt Object
- KBVB – (i) Koninklijke Belgische Voetbalbond (Dutch for Royal Belgian Football Association)

== KC ==
- kC – (s) kilocoulomb
- KCK
  - (i) Kansas City, Kansas
  - Koma Civakên Kurdistan (Kurdish, "Union of Communities in Kurdistan")
- KCL – (i) King's College London
- KCMO – (p) Kansas City, Missouri (pronounced "K-C-Moe")
- KCN - (s) potassium cyanide
- KCS – (s) Kansas City Southern Railway (AAR reporting mark)

== KD ==
- KD – (i) Kawasaki disease – Kraft Dinner

== KE ==
- KE
  - (s) Kenya (FIPS 10-4 country code; ISO 3166 digram)
  - (i) kinetic energy
  - knowledge engineering
- KEDO – (a) Korean Peninsula Energy Development Organization
- KEN – (s) Kenya (ISO 3166 trigram)
- KERA – (a) Kentucky Education Reform Act (of 1990)
- kerma – (p) kinetic energy released in material / in matter / per unit mass
- KERS - (a) kinetic energy recovery system (pronounced Kah-Z)
- KES
  - (s) Kenyan shilling (ISO 4217 currency code)
  - (i) Killer Elite Squad (Japanese professional wrestling stable)
- KESR – (i) Kent and East Sussex Railway
- KET
  - (i) Kentucky Educational Television
  - (a) Key English Test

== KF ==
- kF – (s) kilofarad
- KFC – (i) Kentucky Fried Chicken
- KFOR – (p) UN Kosovo Force
- KFUPM – King Fahd University of Petroleum & Minerals

== KG ==
- kg – (s) kilogram – Kongo language (ISO 639-1 code)
- KG
  - (s) Kyrgyzstan (FIPS 10-4 country code; ISO 3166 digram)
  - (s) Knight of the Order of the Garter
- KGB – (i) Komitet Gosudarstvennoy Bezopasnosti (Russian "Committee for State Security") (1954–1991)
- KGO – Knight of the Guelphic Order of Hanover
- KGS – (s) Kyrgyz som (ISO 4217 currency code)
- KGZ – (s) Kyrgyzstan (ISO 3166 trigram)

== KH ==
- kH – (s) kilohenry
- KH – (s) Cambodia (ISO 3166 digram)
- khm – (s) Khmer language (ISO 639-2 code)
- KHL – (i) Kontinental Hockey League
- KHM – (s) Cambodia (ISO 3166 trigram)
- KHP — (s) Honorary Physician to the King (UK)
- KHR – (s) Cambodian riel (ISO 4217 currency code)
- KHz – (s) kilohertz

== KI ==
- ki – (s) Gikuyu language (ISO 639-1 code)
- Ki – (s) Kibi
- KI – (s) Kiribati (ISO 3166 digram)
- KIA – (i) killed in action
- kik – (s) Gikuyu language (ISO 639-2 code), common typo for LOL
- kin – (s) Kinyarwanda language (ISO 639-2 code)
- kir – (s) Kyrgyz language (ISO 639-2 code)
- KIR – (s) Kiribati (ISO 3166 trigram)
- KISS – (a) keep it simple, stupid / keep it short and simple – Korean Intelligence Support System
- KITECH – (p) Korean Institute of Industrial Technology
- KITT – (a) Knight Industries Two Thousand – Knight Industries Three Thousand

== KJ ==
- kj – (s) Kuanyama language (ISO 639-1 code)
- kJ – (s) kilojoule

== KK ==
- kk – (s) Kazakh language (ISO 639-1 code)
- kK – (s) kilokelvin
- KK
  - (i) Kabushiki kaisha (Japanese for "stock company", found in the legal names of countless Japanese corporations)
  - Košarkarski klub (Slovenian), Košarkaški Klub (Croatian and Serbian in Latin script), Кошаркашки клуб (Serbian Cyrillic), Krepšinio Klubas (Lithuanian); all mean "Basketball Club", as in KK Olimpija, KK Cibona, KK Partizan, and KK Atletas
- KKK – (i) Ku Klux Klan

== KL ==
- kl – (s) Kalaallisut language (ISO 639-1 code)
- kL – (s) kilolitre
- KL – (i) Kuala Lumpur – (s) Kerala (Indian state code)
- KLENOT – (p) KLEť observatory near Earth and other unusual objects observations team and telescope
- KLM – (i) Koninklijke Luchtvaart Maatschappij (Dutch "Royal Dutch Airlines")
- KLOC – (a) kilo lines of code
- KLS
  - (i) Kleine–Levin syndrome
  - Košarkaška liga Srbije (Latin) or Кошаркашка лига Србије (Cyrillic) (Serbian, "Basketball League of Serbia")
  - Kuala Lumpur Sentral

== KM ==
- km – (s) Khmer language (ISO 639-1 code) – kilometre
- KM – (s) Comoros – (i) knowledge management
- KMF – (s) Comoro franc (ISO 4217 currency code)
- KMFDM – (i) Kein Mitleid für die Mehrheit (German "No pity for the majority" music band)
- KMR – (i) Kwajalein Missile Range

== KN ==
- kn – (s) Kannada language (ISO 639-1 code)
- kN – (s) kilonewton
- KN – (s) Democratic People's Republic of Korea (FIPS 10-4 country code) – Saint Kitts and Nevis (ISO 3166 digram)
- KNA – (s) Saint Kitts and Nevis (ISO 3166 trigram)
- KNVB – (i) Koninklijke Nederlandse Voetbal Bond (Dutch for Royal Dutch Football Association)

== KO ==
- ko – (s) Korean language (ISO 639-1 code)
- KO – (i) Knocked Out
- kom – (s) Komi language (ISO 639-2 code)
- kon – (s) Kongo language (ISO 639-2 code)
- kor – (s) Korean language (ISO 639-2 code)
- KOR – (s) Republic of Korea (ISO 3166 trigram)
- KOSA – (a) Kids Online Safety Act

== KP ==
- KP – (i) Kim Possible
- KPMG – (i) Klynveld, Peat, Marwick, Goerdeler
- KPNO – (i) Kitt Peak National Observatory
- KPV – (i) Krupnokaliberniy Pulemet Vladimorova (Russian КПВТ Крупнокалиберный Пулемет Владимирова, "Large-Calibre Machinegun Vladimirov")
- KPVT – (i) Krupnokaliberniy Pulemet Vladimorova Tankoviy (Russian КПВТ Крупнокалиберный Пулемет Владимирова Танковый, "Large-Calibre Machinegun Vladimirov Tank")
- KPW – (s) North Korean won (ISO 4217 currency code)
- K–Pg – (i) Cretaceous–Paleogene Boundary
- K/Pg – (i) Cretaceous/Paleogene Boundary

== KQ ==
- KQ – (s) Kenya Airways (IATA airline designator) – Kingman Reef (FIPS 10-4 territory code)

== KR ==
- kr – (s) Kanuri language (ISO 639-1 code)
- Kr – (s) Krypton
- KR – (s) Kiribati (FIPS 10-4 country code) – Republic of Korea (ISO 3166 digram)
- KRW – (s) South Korean won (ISO 4217 currency code)

== KS ==
- ks
  - (s) Kashmiri language (ISO 639-1 code)
  - kilosecond
- kS – (s) kilosiemens
- KS
  - (s) Kansas (postal symbol)
  - Republic of Korea (FIPS 10-4 country code)
- KSC – (i) Kennedy Space Center
- KSI – (i) Killed or Seriously Injured
- KSM
  - (i) Korean Service Medal
  - Khalid Sheikh Mohammed
- KSU
  - (i) Kansas State University
  - Kennesaw State University

== KT ==
- kT – (s) kilotesla
- KT – (s) Christmas Island (FIPS 10-4 territory code) – (i) Knight of the Order of the Thistle – Knights Templar
- K–T – (i) Cretaceous–Tertiary Boundary
- K/T – (i) Cretaceous/Tertiary Boundary
- KTS – (i) Knight of the Tower and Sword (of Portugal)

== KU ==
- ku – (s) Kurdish language (ISO 639-1 code)
- KU
  - (s) Kuwait (FIPS 10-4 country code)
  - (i/p) University of Kansas
- kua – (s) Kuanyama language (ISO 639-2 code)
- KUL – (i) Katholieke Universiteit Leuven (Flemish, Catholic University of Leuven)
- kur – (s) Kurdish language (ISO 639-2 code)
- KUW – (s) Kuwait (UNDP country code, IOC and FIFA trigram, but not ISO 3166)

== KV ==
- kv – (s) Komi language (ISO 639-1 code)
- kV – (s) kilovolt
- KV - (s) Kosovo
- KV – (s) Kavminvodyavia (IATA airline designator) – (i) Kendriya Vidhyalaya (Indian school) – Kliment Voroshilov (tanks) – Köchel-Verzeichnis (Mozart catalogue) – Valley of the Kings (originally "Kings' Valley")
- KVM – (i) Keyboard, Video, Mouse switch
- KVT – (i) Killer-Victim Table (military simulations)

== KW ==
- kw – (s) Cornish language (ISO 639-1 code)
- kW – (s) kilowatt
- KW – (s) Kuwait (ISO 3166 digram)
- KWB – Kids' WB!
- KWD – (s) Kuwaiti dinar (ISO 4217 currency code)
- KWT – (s) Kuwait (ISO 3166 trigram)

== KX ==
- KX – (s) Cayman Airways (IATA airline designator)

== KY ==
- ky – (s) Kyrgyz language (ISO 639-1 code)
- KY
  - (s) Cayman Islands (ISO 3166 digram)
  - Kentucky (postal symbol)
- KYD – (s) Cayman Islands dollar (ISO 4217 currency code)
- KYTC – (p) Kentucky Transportation Cabinet

== KZ ==
- KZ – (s) Kazakhstan (FIPS 10-4 country code; ISO 3166 digram)
- KZN – (i) KwaZulu-Natal
- KZT – (s) Kazakh tenge (ISO 4217 currency code)
