= KDS =

KDS may refer to:

== Government and politics ==
- Christian Democratic Party (Czech Republic) (1990–1996; Czech: Křesťanskodemokratická strana)
- Christian Democratic Unity, Sweden (founded 1964; Swedish: Kristen demokratisk samling)
- Committee for State Security (Bulgaria) (1963–1989; Bulgarian: Komitet za dǎržavna sigurnost)
- Combat League of German Socialists (1999–2008; German: Kampfbund Deutscher Sozialisten)
- Conservative Democrats of Slovakia (2008–2014; Slovak: Konzervatívni demokrati Slovenska)

== Other uses ==
- KDS (company), a French provider of travel and expense management systems
- Korea Data Systems, a defunct South Korean monitor manufacturer
- Khalsa Diwan Society Vancouver, a Canadian Sikh religious organization
- Kinetic data structure, used to track moving geometric bodies in computers

== See also ==
- KD (disambiguation)
- KDZ (disambiguation)
- KTS (disambiguation)
