= Kapital =

Kapital may refer to:

== Literature ==
- Das Kapital, a theoretical text of Karl Marx
- Kapital (magazine), a Norwegian business magazine
- Kapital (newspaper), weekly newspaper from North Macedonia

== Companies ==
- KAPITAL, a Japanese denim and clothing brand
- Kapital Entertainment, an American entertainment company
- Kapital Bank, an Azerbaijani bank
- Kapital Network International, a Eurasian accounting and consulting firm network

== Entertainment ==
- Kapital, 1992 studio album by Laibach

== Other ==
- Kapital Bank Arena – Multi-use stadium in Sumgayit, Azerbaijan
- Kapitalanlagegesetzbuch – German Investment Code for investment management

== See also ==
- Das Kapital (disambiguation)
