= KYS =

KYS, Kys or kys may refer to:

== Places ==
- Kys (Caria), a town of ancient Anatolia
- Kolej Yayasan Saad, a school in Malaysia (built 1995)
- Kuopio University Hospital, Finland (built 1959)

== Other uses ==
- Kys, a novel by Tatyana Tolstaya
- Krantikari Yuva Sangathan, a student organization in New Delhi, India
- Abbreviation of "kill yourself" used as internet slang
  - A backronym for "keep yourself safe"

== See also ==
- Kill Yourself (disambiguation)
- KY (disambiguation)
