= Kagg =

Kagg may refer to:

- KAGG, American radio station
- KAGG (law), set of German regulations
- Lars Kagg (1595–1661), Swedish nobleman
