= Qul =

Qul may refer to:

- Qul (Turkic), a word meaning "slave"
- Qul, Tajikistan, a village
- North Bolivian Quechua (ISO 639-3: qul), a dialect spoken in Bolivia

== See also ==
- Cool (disambiguation)
- Kul (disambiguation)
- Cul (disambiguation)
