= Kibbi =

Kibbi may refer to:

- Kibbeh, a dish made of bulgah and chopped meat
- Kibi, Ghana, a town in southeastern Ghana

== See also ==
- Kibi (disambiguation)
