= Kilometer zero =

Kilometer zero or kilometre zero may refer to:

- Kilometre zero, a particular location from which distances are traditionally measured
  - Kilometre Zero (Bucharest), a monument in Bucharest, Romania
  - Zero Kilometre Stone, a monument in Budapest, Hungary

== Film ==
- Kilometer Zero (film), a 2007 Russian film
- Km. 0, a 2000 Spanish film
- Kilomètre Zéro, a 2005 French-Kurdish film

== Other uses ==
- Kilometer Zero, a collective of international artists and writers
- The southernmost point of the trenches on the Western Front during WW1 which extended from the Swiss border to the North Sea

== See also ==
- Kilometre
- Zero (disambiguation)
- KM (disambiguation)
- 0 (disambiguation)
- Zero Mile (disambiguation)
