= Ka =

Ka or KA may refer to:

== Arts and entertainment ==
- K.A. (Kohntarkosz Anteria), a 2004 album by Magma
- KA (film), a 2024 Indian Telugu-language crime thriller film directed by the duo Sujith and Sandeep
- Kà, a Cirque du Soleil show
- Ka (Dark Tower), a plot element in Stephen King's Dark Tower series
- Mister Mosquito, a 2001 video game, known in Japan as Ka
- Kingda Ka, a former roller coaster at Six Flags Great Adventure

== Businesses and organizations ==
=== Businesses ===
- Aero Nomad Airlines, a Kyrgyz airline (IATA code KA)
- Cathay Dragon, formerly Dragonair (former IATA code KA)
- Kenya Airways
- Kamov, a Russian rotorcraft manufacturing company, whose products are prefixed with "La"

=== Fraternities ===
- Kappa Alpha Order, a fraternity founded in 1865 at Washington and Lee
- Kappa Alpha Society, a fraternity founded in 1825 at Union College
- Kuklos Adelphon, an 1800s-era Southern fraternity

=== Other organizations ===
- Karenni Army, a Burmese guerilla organization
- Knattspyrnufélag Akureyrar, an Icelandic football club
- Khan Academy, a non-profit educational organization
- King's Arms, Oxford, a pub known as the KA

== Language ==
=== Languages ===
- Ka, a variety of the Central Banda language
- Georgian language, by ISO 639-1 code

=== Characters ===
- Ka (Bengali), a consonant character
- Ka (cuneiform)
- Ka (Cyrillic), a letter in the Cyrillic script
- Ka (Indic), a group of related glyphs from the Brahmic family of scripts
- Devanagari ka, a letter in the Devanagari script
- Ka (Javanese) (ꦏ), a letter in the Javanese script
- Ka (kana), a syllabic grapheme in the Japanese katakana and hiragana scripts

== People ==
- Ka (pharaoh) (fl. c. thirty-second century B.C.), Predynastic pharaoh of Upper Egypt
- Ka (rapper) (1972–2024), performer

== Places ==
- Ka Farm, Østre Toten, Norway; see List of short place names
- Ka Island (Ka-to), North Korea
- Ka Lae, Hawaii, southernmost point in the fifty United States
- KA postcode area, Scotland
- Ka River, Nigeria
- Karlsruhe, Germany (e.g. code used on German vehicle registration plates)
- Karnataka, India

== Science and technology ==
=== Biology ===
- K_{a}, the absorption rate constant of a drug
- K_{a}, number of non-synonymous substitutions at a DNA site, used in K_{a}/K_{s} ratio
- Ka tree, Terminalia carolinensis

=== Other uses in science and technology ===
- K_{a}, an acid dissociation constant
- K_{a} band, a microwave band
- Keepalive, a computer network message
- Kiloampere (kA), a unit of electric current
- kiloannum or kiloannus (ka), a unit of time equal to one thousand (10^{3}) years

== Vehicles ==
- Ford Ka, a car
- NZR K^{A} class, a New Zealand steam locomotive

== Other uses ==
- Ka or kꜣ, "double" or "vital essence", an Ancient Egyptian concept of the soul or spirit
- Knight or Dame of St Andrew, a Barbadian award
- KA, a carbonated drink produced by the company A.G. Barr
