= Minvody =

Minvody may refer to:

- Mineralnye Vody, a town in Stavropol Krai, Russia, sometimes referred to as Minvody, MinVody, or Min-Vody (Russian: Минводы, Russian: МинВоды, Russian: Мин-Воды, IPA: [mʲɪn ˈvodɨ])
- AIR MINVODY, the call sign of Kavminvodyavia (KMV Avia), a defunct Russian airline which operated from 1995 until 2011
