= KV =

KV may refer to:

== Places ==
- Kosovo, an Eastern European country
- Kennebecasis Valley, a region in New Brunswick, Canada
- KV (Egyptology), Kings' Valley, tombs in the Valley of the Kings, Egypt

== Companies and organizations ==
- KV Pharmaceutical, a drug company
- KV Racing Technology, an auto racing team
- KV, the IATA designator for Sky Regional Airlines
- Kendriya Vidyalaya, a system of schools for the children of public servants in India
- Khosla Ventures, an American venture capital firm
- Knattspyrnufélag Vesturbæjar, an Icelandic football club
- Kavminvodyavia, a Russian airline
- Swedish Prison and Probation Service (Swedish: Kriminalvården), government agency
- Katholieke Verkenners (English:"Catholic Scouts"), part of Scouting Nederland

== Science and technology ==
=== Computing ===
- Kv, a programming language implemented in Kivy
- Karnaugh-Veitch diagram, a logic optimization method
- Key–value pair
- Key–value database, or key–value store

=== Other uses in science and technology ===
- Kv (flow factor), a measure of the flow factor of a liquid
- Kilovolt (kV), a unit of electric potential
- Motor velocity constant (K_{v}), of an electric motor
- Voltage-gated potassium channel (K_{v}), in cell biology

== Vehicles ==
- Kliment Voroshilov tank, a series of Soviet Second World War heavy tanks
- KV, prefix (NoCGV in English) for Norwegian Coast Guard vessels

== Other uses ==
- Köchel-Verzeichnis, a catalogue of compositions by Mozart
- Komi language (ISO 639-1 code "kv"), spoken by the Komi peoples in the northeastern European part of Russia
- "KV" (fictional virus), the fictional viral plague from the 2007 film I Am Legend (film)

== See also ==
- Koninklijke Voetbalvereniging (disambiguation)
- KVS (disambiguation)
- VK (disambiguation)
- V (disambiguation)
- K (disambiguation)
