= KVS =

KVS may stand for:

- Kansas Vocational School, later known as Kansas Technical Institute (Topeka), a defunct, public, historically black college, located in Topeka, Kansas, United States
- Kendriya Vidyalaya Sangathan, a school chain in India
- KVS (France), a former microcar manufacturer
- Koninklijke Vlaamse Schouwburg, a theatre in Brussels

== See also ==
- KV-5 tank
- KV5 tomb
- KV (disambiguation)
- KVZ (disambiguation)
