= KVS (France) =

French microcar manufacturer

SA K.V.S.
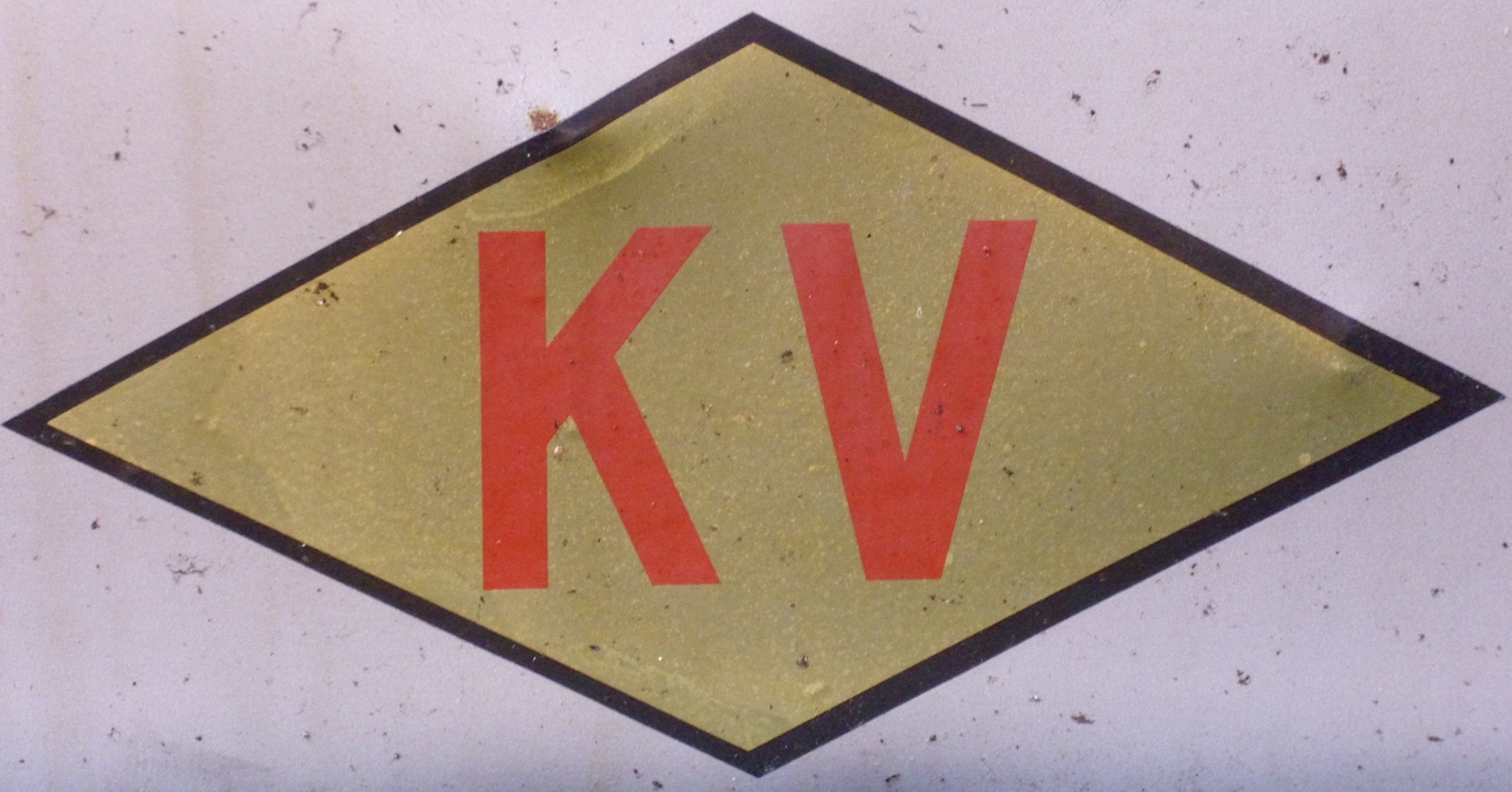
- Company type: Société anonyme
- Industry: Automotive industry
- Founded: 1978
- Headquarters: Lyon-Chassieu, France
- Key people: Joseph Spalek
- Products: microcars

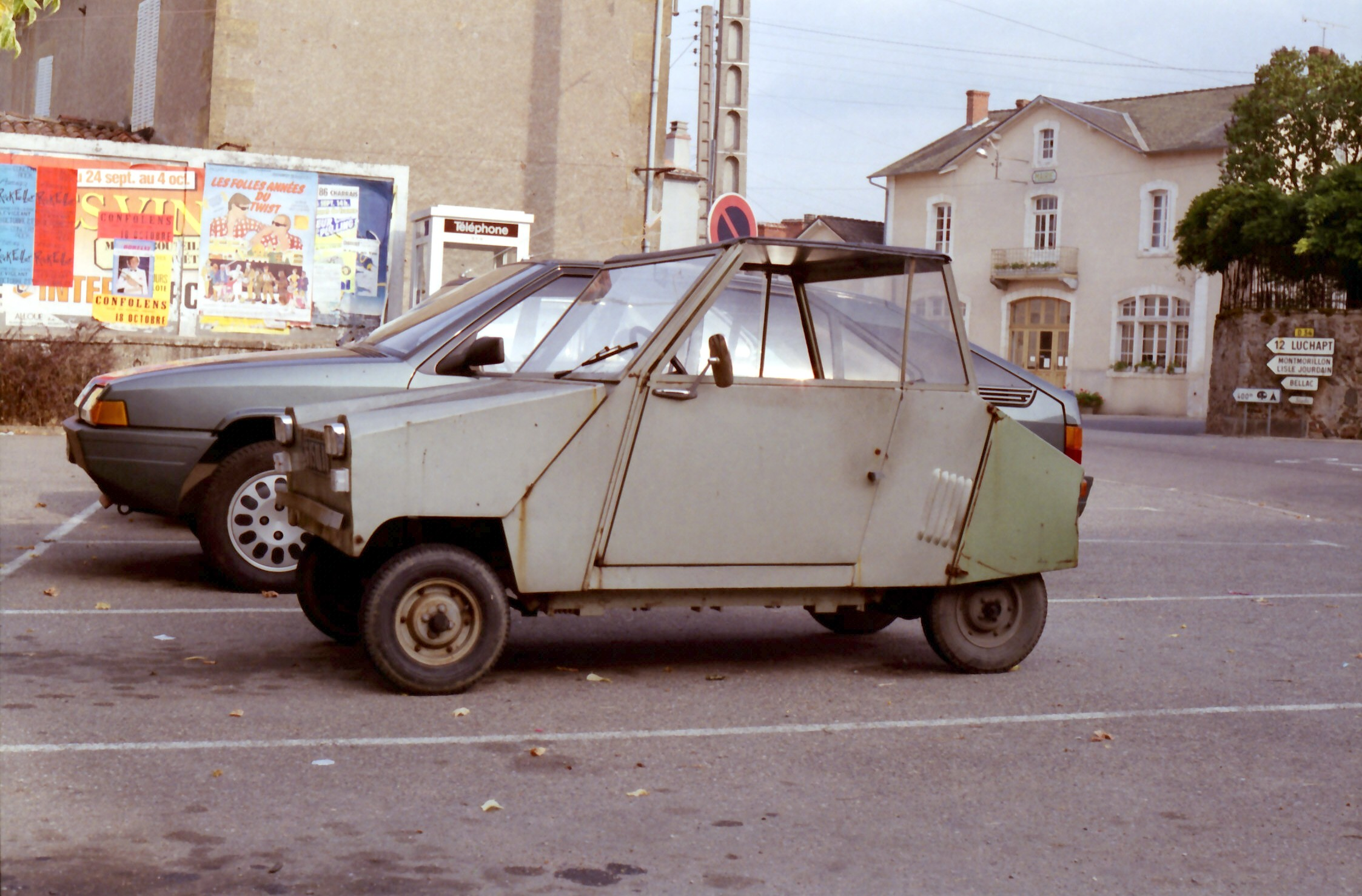

K.V.S. was a small manufacturing company based in Lyon-Chassieu, France, which manufactured a range of microcars. KVS, previously 'Les Equipements Electriques K.V.' had their origins within 'SA Fabrique Lyonnaise de Motocyclettes New-Map et Motosacoche', producers of the New-Map motorcycle range and originators of the Rolux and Solyto microcars. New-Map were suppliers of metal fabrications to KV whose primary business was in the manufacture of telephone equipment. When the Director of New-Map retired, KV took over the company and continued production of the Solyto until 1974. KV became KVS in 1978 after the company was again resold with the production of microcars as its main aim. Microcar production ceased in 1985.

== See also ==
- List of microcars by country of origin
