= KF =

KF or Kf may refer to:

== Businesses and brands ==
- KF Aerospace, a Canadian aerospace company
  - KF Cargo, a Canadian cargo airline
  - KF Defence Programs, a Canadian defense contractor
- Korea Foundation
- Air Belgium, an airline based in Belgium (IATA code KF)
- Blue1, a defunct airline based in Finland (IATA code KF)
- Kelly's Fuels, fuels merchant in Northern Ireland
- Kettle Foods, a snack foods manufacturer
- Kooperativa Förbundet, a cooperative Swedish retail chain
- KrisFlyer, the frequent flyer program of Singapore Airlines

== Games ==
- Katamari Forever, a video game for the PlayStation 3
- Killing Floor (2009 video game), a cooperative survival horror video game

== Science and technology ==
=== Chemistry ===
- Potassium fluoride, a chemical substance
- Cryoscopic constant, K_{f}, related to freezing-point depression
- Karl Fischer titration
- Stability constants of complexes, abbreviated as K_{f} (constant of formation)

=== Other uses in science and technology ===
- A member of the Mazda K engine family
- Kalman filter, in mathematics
- Kleinflansch, a quick release vacuum flange
- Filtration coefficient
- Kline–Fogleman airfoil
- KDE Frameworks, a collection of libraries for Qt applications

== Sports ==
- Knattspyrnufélag Fjallabyggðar, an Icelandic sports team
- KF, in kart racing, the designation of Original Kart from 2013–2016

== Other uses ==
- Kiwi Farms, a web forum
