= KNFX-FM =

- Bryan, Texas; United States
- Broadcast area: Brazos Valley
- Frequency: 99.5 MHz
- Branding: 99.5 The Fox

Programming
- Format: Classic rock

Ownership
- Owner: iHeartMedia, Inc.; (iHM Licenses, LLC)
- Sister stations: KAGG, KKYS, KVJM

History
- Former call signs: KBMA (1990–2001)
- Call sign meaning: Station brands as "The Fox"

Technical information
- Licensing authority: FCC
- Facility ID: 41410
- Class: A
- ERP: 6,000 watts
- HAAT: 100 m (328 ft)
- Transmitter coordinates: 30°39′2.00″N 96°20′58.00″W

Links
- Public license information: Public file; LMS
- Webcast: Listen Live
- Website: 995thefox.iheart.com

KNFX-FM (99.5 MHz) is a radio station broadcasting a classic rock format. Licensed to Bryan, Texas, United States, the station serves the Bryan/College Station area. The station is currently owned by iHeartMedia, Inc. and is a member of the Clear Channel Radio Network The station's studios are located at Galleria Village on Briarcrest Drive in Bryan, and its transmitter is located a mile west near the property of unrelated Brazos Valley Communications radio outlets.

Between 1990 and August 18, 2001, it was owned by Felix Torres as Spanish-language KBMA, "La Fabulosa".
