= KVZ =

KVZ or kvz may refer to:

- KVZ S.C., a sports club in Tanzania and Zanzibar
- VEB Plasticart or VEB Kunststoff-Verarbeitung Zschopau, a model and toy manufacturer
- Kavali railway station's rail station code
- Tsaukambo language's ISO 639 language code
- Kommunistische Volkszeitung, a publication of the Communist League of West Germany
- Z-Aero Airlines' ICAO airline code

== See also ==
- KV-2, a tank
- KV2, a tomb
- KVS (disambiguation)
