= Katherine Rothman =

American public relations expert

Katherine M. Rothman
- Born: Great Neck, New York
- Occupation: Public relations
- Employer: KMR Communications
- Known for: Public relations
- Title: Chief executive officer
- Website: kmrcommunications.com

Katherine M. Rothman is the CEO and founder of KMR Communications, Inc.

Prior to founding KMR Communications, Inc Ms. Rothman was the Vice President of Amanda Beth Uhry Public Relations in New York. Fempreneur Magazine selected Katherine as one of its top 30 female entrepreneurs in the nation. Ms. Rothman is on the committee of The United Cerebral Palsy's Women Who Care Luncheon whose hosts include Robin Givens, Paula Zahn, Donna Hanover, Lauren Bush, and Petra Nemcova.

She was a featured speaker at the 11th annual Society of Hair Restoration Symposium and is a frequent annual speaker at The Day Spa Association trade show at The Jacob Javits Center in New York. Katherine has devoted a portion of her free time to charitable causes such as Make-A-Wish Foundation and was responsible for coordinating an event for 2,000 guests at Radio City Music Hall to raise money for the organization. She was also affiliated with DISHES, The Group for the Southfork, as well as the Jewish Guild For The Blind. She was an active member of the Little Baby Face Foundation. She has also participated in the charity "Kids In Candyland" to benefit the Lexox Hill Neighborhood House. The National Register also named her in their Who's Who list of executives and professionals for their 2002-2004 editions. Fempreneur Magazine selected Katherine as one of its top 30 female entrepreneurs in the nation.

Ms. Rothman has appeared on CNN, CBS The Early Show, Bravo TV’s Real Housewives of New York City, and has been quoted and featured in numerous publications. She attended American University, New York University and received her B.A. from Marymount Manhattan College.
