= Kaydee (disambiguation) =

Kaydee were a four-piece pop rock band from Kilkenny, Ireland

Kaydee may also refer to:

- Kaydee, Alberta in Yellowhead County
- Kaydee "Caine" Lawson, a fictional character in the film Menace II Society
- Kay-Dee, record label run by Keb Darge and Kenny Dope
- Kaydee, a rapper and percussionist on Donna Summer's album Mistaken Identity
- Kappa Delta, sorority

== See also ==
- Caydee Denney (born 1993), American pair figure skater
- KD (disambiguation)
- K-Dee (born 1969), American rapper
- KDEE-LP, radio station
- Kaede (disambiguation)
