= Kirs =

Kirs may refer to:

People

- Eduard Kirs (1887–1963), Estonian music teacher, trade unionist and politician
- Friido Kirs (1889–1948), Estonian schoolteacher and politician
- Rudolf Kirs (1915–1963), Czech cellist
- Urmas Kirs (b. 1966), Estonian footballer and manager
- Vallo Kirs (b. 1987), Estonian actor

Places

- Kirs, former name of Kitsk, a village in Armenia
- Kirs, Russia, a town in Kirov Oblast, Russia

Other

- K_{ir}s, inwardly-rectifying potassium channels
- KIRS (FM), a radio station (107.7 FM) licensed to serve Stockton, Missouri, United States
- Kirsch Municipal Airport, ICAO code KIRS

== See also ==
- KIR (disambiguation)
