= KBOS =

KBOS may refer to:

- Logan International Airport (ICAO location indicator: KBOS), serving Boston, Massachusetts, United States
- KBOS-FM, a radio station licensed to Tulare, California, United States
- KBOs, Kuiper belt objects

== See also ==
- KBO (disambiguation)
