= Zero Mile =

Zero Mile or variation, may refer to:

== Distances ==
- Zero milepost, the origination point for measuring distances in a jurisdiction or on a route
- Zero Milestone, a zero mile marker monument in Washington, D.C.
- Zero Mile Stone (Nagpur), a monument locating the geographical center of colonial India in the city of Nagpur, Maharashtra, India
  - Zero Mile Freedom Park metro station, Nagpur, Maharashtra, India
- Zero Mile metro station in Patna, Bihar, India
- Atlanta Zero Mile Post, Georgia, USA

== Other uses ==
- 0 Mile (2017 song) by Korean boy band NCT 127 off their record Cherry Bomb (EP)

== See also ==
- M-153 (Michigan highway) or Ford Road, which serves as the zero-mile line for the Detroit area's Mile Road System
- Mile Road System (Michigan)
- Mile Road System (Detroit)
- Zero (disambiguation)
- Milestone (disambiguation)
- Stone (disambiguation)
- Mile (disambiguation)
- Kilometre zero (disambiguation)
