= VKS =

VKS may refer to:

- Russian Aerospace Forces, romanization of Russian name as Vozdushno-kosmicheskiye sily, or VKS
- V. K. Sasikala (born 1954), Indian businesswoman known as VKS
- Vanuatu Kaljoral Senta, national cultural institution of Vanuatu
- VKS sniper rifle, Russian rifle

== See also ==
- VK (disambiguation)
