= Koninklijke Voetbal Vereniging =

Koninklijke Voetbal Vereniging or Koninklijke Voetbalvereniging (KVV) means "Royal Football Association" is often used in Dutch and Belgian association football clubs, such as:

- Club Brugge KV, a football club based in Bruges, Belgium
- K.V. Turnhout
- KCVV Elewijt, a Belgian association football club from the village of Elewijt
- K.V.V. Belgica Edegem Sport, a Belgian association football club from the municipality of Edegem
- K. Sint-Truidense V.V.
- KV Mechelen

== See also ==
- KV (disambiguation)
- KVV (disambiguation)
