= KKYS =

- Bryan, Texas; United States
- Broadcast area: Brazos Valley
- Frequency: 104.7 MHz
- Branding: Mix 104.7

Programming
- Format: Hot adult contemporary
- Affiliations: Premiere Networks

Ownership
- Owner: iHeartMedia, Inc.; (iHM Licenses, LLC)
- Sister stations: KVJM, KNFX-FM, KAGG

History
- First air date: July 28, 1984; 42 years ago (at 104.9)
- Former call signs: KFFV (1984, CP)
- Former frequencies: 104.9 MHz (1984–1990)
- Call sign meaning: Similar to "Kiss", original branding

Technical information
- Licensing authority: FCC
- Facility ID: 54903
- Class: C2
- ERP: 50,000 watts
- HAAT: 87 m (285 ft)
- Transmitter coordinates: 30°42′59″N 96°22′20″W

Links
- Public license information: Public file; LMS
- Webcast: Listen Live
- Website: mix1047.iheart.com

KKYS (104.7 FM, "Mix 104.7") is a radio station broadcasting a hot adult contemporary format. Licensed to Bryan, Texas, United States, the station serves the Brazos Valley. The station is owned by iHeartMedia, Inc. Its studios and transmitter are located separately in Bryan.

== History ==
Radio Sungroup of Bryan-College Station was granted a construction permit, on February 7, 1984, to build a broadcast radio station at 104.9 MHz, which was assigned the call letters KFFV by the Federal Communications Commission. The callsign was changed on the permit to the current KKYS by request on May 29, 1984, to correspond with the contemporary hit radio format that Radio Sungroup would launch, branded as "Kiss 105". KKYS was granted a license to cover on November 13, 1984.

The "Kiss" branding once used by KKYS predated the Clear Channel/iHeartMedia ownership, who owns the trademark to the "Kiss" branding, as the facility used the name from its inception until the change to the current "Mix" branding when the format morphed from CHR to adult contemporary. KISS-FM in San Antonio is another such example of a radio station that has utilized the "Kiss" name, but not owned by the radio conglomerate. iHeartMedia, then as subsidiary CCB Texas Licensing purchased this facility in 2009 from Sunburst Media. Instead of returning the "Kiss" brand to KKYS after the purchase of the facility, iHeart Media changed the format of 103.1 KVJM to "Kiss FM" in 2012, installing the associated CHR format and branding on that facility. KVJM and KKYS are now sister stations to one another.

In 1989, KKYS was granted a minor modification to move its operating frequency down one channel to the current 284 (104.7 MHz) to accommodate an upgrade of a co-channel facility located on 104.9 near Llano, allowing that facility to move into the Austin market. That station currently operates in the Austin market as sports station "104.9 The Horn", licensed as KTXX-FM Bee Cave, Texas. KKYS was granted a License to Cover on the new 104.7 frequency on September 5, 1990.

On January 16, 1998, the station's callsign was briefly switched to KOZN as a stunt, but quickly switched back to KKYS later on the same day. The station has been hot adult contemporary since the late 1990s.

The station was consulted by Bob Mitchell and was the number one rated station in the market for many years until it was purchased by Clear Channel.

Past air staff includes: Ryan "Rhino" O'Brien, Harold Presley, Rick Woodell, Kevin "Hollywood" Harris, Keith Jacobs, Chace Murphy, Scotty Love, Robin Cunningham, Logan Stone, Famous James, and Darren "Taylor" Prater and morning co-hosts Barb, Jules and Dee.

The majority of the airshifts on the station are now voice tracked with a syndicated morning show.
