= KVV =

KVV may refer to:

- Swedish Prison and Probation Service, also known as Kriminalvården
- Karlsruher Verkehrsverbund, the public transport association for Karlsruhe, Germany
- Koninklijke Voetbal Vereniging (disambiguation)
