= KVJM =

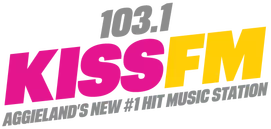
- Hearne, Texas; United States
- Broadcast area: Bryan-College Station, Texas
- Frequency: 103.1 MHz
- Branding: 103-1 Kiss FM

Programming
- Format: Contemporary hit radio
- Affiliations: Premiere Networks

Ownership
- Owner: iHeartMedia, Inc.; (iHM Licenses, LLC)
- Sister stations: KKYS, KNFX-FM, KAGG

History
- First air date: 1984
- Former call signs: KHRN (1984–1998)
- Former frequencies: 94.3 MHz (1984–1998)
- Call sign meaning: Station branded as "V103 Jamz" in 1998

Technical information
- Licensing authority: FCC
- Facility ID: 52835
- Class: A
- ERP: 5,000 watts
- HAAT: 110 m (361 ft)
- Transmitter coordinates: 30°45′35.00″N 96°28′0.00″W

Links
- Public license information: Public file; LMS
- Webcast: Listen Live
- Website: kissfm1031.iheart.com

KVJM (103.1 FM; 103-1 KISS-FM) is a radio station playing Top 40 (CHR) music broadcasting from Bryan/College Station, Texas, and licensed to Hearne, Texas. Under the branding "103-1 Kiss FM", it is owned by iHeartMedia, Inc. The station's studios are located at Galleria Village on Briarcrest Drive in Bryan, and its transmitter is located northwest of Bryan in nearby unincorporated Robertson County.

== History ==
Before KVJM became its current format, it was home to the only Urban Contemporary formatted radio station in the Brazos Valley. Originally KHRN 94.3, the station was launched in 1984 as a part-time Spanish format by day and Urban format by night for ten years. Finally in 1994, KHRN finally relaunched as an Urban station under the name "Power 94." Since it was clear this would be the only Urban station in the region, the playlist was an eclectic mix of Hip Hop, Rap, R&B, Old School R&B, Classic Soul, Gospel, Jazz and Blues. It was home to the Tom Joyner Morning Show and Doug Banks in the afternoons at that time. Then, in an unprecedented move, in 1998, KHRN 94.3 was no more; it changed frequencies to 103.1, its calls to KVJM, and its branding to "V-103 Jamz". In the early 2000s KVJM gained the notoriety of airing morning shows on tape delay between 9 AM and 6 PM. This came after Doug Banks moved his syndicated show to the mornings, but the station continued to air it—this time on tape delay from 2 PM to 6 PM, while Tom Joyner still aired live 5 AM to 9 PM. Eventually, KVJM added the Russ Parr show on tape delay; it aired 10 AM to 2 PM.

That era came to an end when KVJM was sold off to Clear Channel in 2006, of which the new owners finally dropped the Urban format for good and instead replaced it with a Spanish format.

In 1985 a group headed by Bryan businessman Joe Lee Walker the frequency of 94.3 FM was granted. KHRN was licensed to the city of Hearne, TX. The station went on air in May 1985. The starting line-up was Greg Rodriguez with Spanish language. The urban programming began with Alvis (A.J.) Whiteside of nearby Cameron, TX. The mid-shift was Sweet Caroline and Calvin Hill worked the 6–12 midnight shift. In the beginning the advertising was provided by Dallas-based Century 21. The station ended its broadcast day at 12 midnight. K-94FM as it was called has several slogans. Originally it was to be called "Kaptivating" but that never really caught on. Three months later Sedric Walker joined the team as news anchor. Walker, nephew of owner Joe Walker took on a more active role in programming. Using the name of Tony Dean, he quickly moved into the music programming aspect of the radio station. Tony Dean and AJ Whiteside developed an on-air chemistry that would drive KHRN to immense popularity among their devoted listeners. KHRN was ahead of its time. Having a sound like much larger markets stations, K-94 was the rhythm of the Brazos Valley. Bryan, College Station, Hearne, and all the surrounding cities, K-94 was a factor in radio. With high-profile features, such as AJ's "ALL My Children Update", Tony Dean's Fast 5 at 5 Traffic Jamz, the late-night quiet storm show, The Love Flight K-94 held the pulse of the listeners. Memorable characters and commercials included, "MC Foodtown, Henry Lee's color weather radar, "The Hernandez Family were all part of the entertainment. While catering to music lovers of all ages, from classic blues, R&B and rap it was very versatile. K-94FM instituted one of the first rap live music formats in the country with "Yo Friday Night Jamz with Tony Dean and J.Frank Hernandez.

From 1986 to 1992 K-94FM was one of the best stations in the market. In 1992, the station experimented with a change in format. They changed the format to Christian music.

On March 26, 2012, the station flipped to Top 40, and is now operating under the name "Kiss FM."
