= Kin =

Kin usually refers to kinship and family.

Kin or KIN may also refer to:

== Places ==
- Kin empires and dynasties of China, now romanized as Jin
- Kin, Okinawa, a town in Okinawa, Japan
- Kin, Pakistan, a village along the Indus in Pakistan
- Kin, Ye, a village in Ye Township, Myanmar
- Kin, Mogok, a village in Mogok Township, Myanmar

== Arts, entertainment, and media ==
=== Music ===
- Kin (iamamiwhoami album), 2012
- KIN (KT Tunstall album), 2016
- Kin (Pat Metheny album), 2014
- Kin (Mogwai album), 2018
- Kin (Xentrix album), 1992
- Kin (Whitechapel album), 2021

=== Film ===
- Kin (film), a 2018 American science fiction film
- Kin, a 2000 South African-British film by Elaine Proctor
- Kin, upcoming Australian film written by Thomas Atkin, winner of the 2021 John Hinde Award for Excellence in Science-Fiction Writing

=== Television ===
- "Kin" (Justified), a 2013 episode
- "Kin" (The Last of Us), a 2023 episode
- Kin (Irish TV series), Dublin crime drama broadcast from 2021
- Kin (Singaporean TV series), a 2018 Singaporean TV drama series

=== Other arts, entertainment, and media ===
- The Kin, a group of women in the novel series The Wheel of Time
- Kin (comics), a 2000 comic-book limited series by Gary Frank
- "Kin" (short story), a 2006 short story by Bruce McAllister

== Organizations ==
- Kin Canada, a Canadian non-profit service organization
- Kids In Need Foundation, an American charity

== Transportation ==
- Kingston station (Rhode Island), an Amtrak station
- Norman Manley International Airport, serving Kingston, Jamaica

== Other uses ==
- K'in, a day in the Maya Calendar
- Kin (mass), a Japanese unit of mass
- DNA/RNA-binding protein KIN17, encoded by the KIN gene
- Kinyarwanda, the national language of Rwanda
- Microsoft Kin, a family of mobile phones
- Kin, a cryptocurrency token by Kik Interactive
- Kin or rin, a Japanese standing bell

== See also ==
- Jin (disambiguation), formerly romanized as kin in Chinese contexts
- Ken (disambiguation)
- Kin selection, an evolutionary strategy that favors the reproductive success of an organism's relatives
- Otherkin, people who identify as not entirely human
- Kinism, a white supremacist religious movement
- Kihn, surname
- Kinh, the majority ethnic group of Vietnam
