= Kays =

Kays or KAYS may refer to:

- KAYS (AM), a radio station
- Waycross-Ware County Airport, by ICAO code
- Kays Catalogues, a former UK mail order catalogue
- Kays Ruiz-Atil, French footballer
- Kays of Scotland, a manufacturer and supplier of curling stones

== See also ==
- Qays, an Arab tribal confederation
- Ks, (disambiguation)
