= Kor =

Kor or KOR may refer to:

== Arts and entertainment ==
- Kor (Star Trek), a Klingon character in the fictional Star Trek universe
- Kôr, a fictitious African lost city, setting of H. Rider Haggard's novel She
- Kor (Forgotten Realms), a fictional deity of the Al-Qadim campaign setting from Dungeons & Dragons
- Kimagure Orange Road, a 1984 anime series
- Kor of the Metal Heads, a character in the video game Jak II
- Kor, a fantasy race of humanoids found in the Magic: The Gathering card game
- Kor Meteor, the protagonist of Tales of Hearts

== People ==
=== Surname ===
- Avshalom Kor (born 1950), Israeli linguist
- Eva Mozes Kor (1934–2019), Romanian-born American Holocaust survivor
- Layton Kor (1938–2013), American rock climber
- Paul Kor (1926–2001), Israeli painter, graphic designer, children's author, and illustrator
- Rasoul Kor (born 1989), Iranian footballer

=== Given name ===
- Kor Sarr (1975–2019), Senegalese football player and manager

== Places ==
- kor, ISO 3166-1 alpha-3 and IOC country code for South Korea
- Kor River, in Fars Province, Iran
- Kor, East Azerbaijan, a village in Iran
- Kor-e Sofla, a village in East Azerbaijan Province, Iran

== Languages ==
- kor, ISO 639-2 code for the Korean language
- kor, ISO 639-3 code for Modern Korean

== Other uses ==
- Kor or Homer, an ancient Hebrew unit
- Komitet Obrony Robotników ("Workers' Defence Committee"), a Polish civil society group
- κ-opioid receptor, a human protein
