= KMR =

KMR may refer to:

- KMR Racing Team, a motorcycle racing team
- KMR Communications, a company founded by Katherine Rothman
- KMR Sport, a British racing team
- Kent Music Report, an Australian former record chart
- Kevin Michael Richardson, American actor
- Klondike Mines Railway, a railway in Yukon, Canada
- Karimui Airport, an airport in Papua New Guinea (IATA code: KMR)
- Northern Kurdish or Kurmanji, a group of Kurdish dialects (ISO 639-3 code: kmr)
