= KHR =

KHR may be:

- Cambodian riel, the currency of Cambodia
- Kharkhorin Airport in Mongolia (IATA code)
- KHR Arkitekter, a Danish architecture company
- KHR-1, a robot
