= Ket =

Ket or KET may refer to:

== Algebra ==
- The right part of bra–ket notation, $|\psi\rangle$
- Ket (software), an algebra editor

== Ethnicity and language ==
- Ket people, an ethnic group of Siberia
- Ket language, spoken in Siberia

== Fiction and mythology ==
- Ket (Greyhawk), a fictional nation in Dungeons and Dragons
- Cet mac Mágach, of Irish myth
- Ket and Wig, from the Danish history Gesta Danorum
- A name of the Celtic mythic figure Ceridwen

== Persons with the name ==
- Ket Sivan (born 1981), Cambodian swimmer
- Ket (king), a 16th-century king of Lan Na
- Rhian Ket (born 1983), Dutch speed skater

== Places ==
- Ket (river), Siberia
- Keť, Slovakia
- Kettering railway station, England (code:KET)
- Kengtung Airport, Myanmar (IATA:KET)
- Kennedy Town station, Hong Kong, China (MTR:KET)

== Other uses ==
- KET, an American public TV network
- Ketamine, a dissociative anaesthetic drug
- Key English Test, an international exam

== See also ==
- Kit (disambiguation)
- Khet (disambiguation)
