= Kill Yourself =

Kill Yourself may refer to:

- "Kill Yourself", a song by Andrew W.K. from the 2006 album Close Calls with Brick Walls
- "Kill Yourself", a song by Bo Burnham from the 2016 comedy show Make Happy
- "Kill Yourself", a song by Diamond Rexx from the 2003 album Rexx Erected
- "Kill Yourself", a song by Pussy Galore from the 1986 album Groovy Hate Fuck
- "Kill Yourself", a song by Joji, under the name Pink Guy from the 2014 album PINK GUY
- "Kill Yourself", a song by Stormtroopers of Death from the 1985 album Speak English or Die
- "Kill Yourself", a song by Suicideboys from the 2014 EP Kill Yourself Part I: The Suicide Saga
- "Kill Yourself", a song by Timbaland from the 2007 album Shock Value
- "Kill Yourself", a song by Today is the Day from the 1997 Album Temple of the Morning Star

== See also ==
- Suicide, the act of killing oneself
