= KR =

KR or Kr may also refer to:

== Arts and entertainment ==
- Kaiserreich, a Hearts of Iron IV mod
- Kamen Rider, a tokusatsu media franchise
- Kedaulatan Rakyat, an Indonesian newspaper
- Knight Rider, an American media franchise
- Grand Duke Konstantin Konstantinovich of Russia (1858–1915), Russian poet (pen name: "KR")

== Businesses ==
- Kayser-Roth, clothing manufacturer in North Carolina
- Kola Real, a Peruvian brand of soft drinks
- Kroger, an American grocery chain, NYSE symbol

== Computing ==
- .kr, South Korea's top-level domain
- KR (ANSI), an escape sequence
- Knowledge representation and reasoning, in artificial intelligence

== Places ==
- South Korea (ISO 3166-1/WMO country code: KR)
- Kiribati, Micronesia (FIPS 10-4 country code: KR)
- K. R. Market, Bangalore, India
- Province of Crotone, Italy, vehicle registration
- Kreis (Kr.), a German district akin to a county

== Sports ==
- KR (basketball club), associated with Knattspyrnufélag Reykjavíkur
- Knattspyrnufélag Reykjavíkur, an Icelandic football club
- Kickoff returner, in American and Canadian football

== Transportation ==
- Comores Aviation International (IATA airline designator KR)
- Kenya Railways
- Konkan Railway, India
- Korea National Railway, formerly Korea Rail Network Authority
- Krasnodar International Airport, Russia (IATA code: KR)
- Province of Crotone, Italy, vehicle registration

== Other uses ==
- Kanuri language, spoken in Africa's Sahel region (ISO 639: kr)
- Krone (currency), or krona, several currencies
- Krypton, a chemical element (symbol: Kr)
- Order of the Knights of Rizal, the sole order of knighthood in the Philippines
- Khmer Rouge, popular name that was given for members of the Communist Party of Cambodia
