= Cul =

Cul or CUL may refer to:

- Cambridge University Library
- City University London
- Columbia University Library
- Cumberland, from its Chapman code
- Bachigualato Federal International Airport, (IATA airport code: CUL) in Culiacán, Sinaloa, Mexico
- Cul (software), a female vocal for Vocaloid 3
- Serpent (Cul Borson), a Marvel Comics character
- Abbreviation for "See you later"

== See also ==
- Cul de canard, down feathers of a duck
- Cul-de-sac, a short dead-end street
