= KAGG (law) =

Set of German regulations

Gesetz über Kapitalanlagegesellschaften (KAGG) – German for Investment Company Act – was a set of German regulations for mutual funds that was phased out in 2007 and replaced by the German Investment Modernization Act ("Investment Act"). An objective of the new Investment Act is to promote Germany as an investment fund market, stemming the erstwhile exodus of German-managed funds that became domiciled in other European havens, namely Luxembourg. BaFin is the regulatory enforcement agency that oversees the German financial industry.
