= KS =

KS and variants may refer to:

== Arts and media ==
- Katawa Shoujo, a 2012 visual novel
- Kammersänger, a German honorary title for a distinguished opera singer
- Keenspot, a webcomics/webtoons portal founded in March 2000 by cartoonist Chris Crosby
- Kill stealing, a practice in online games
- Kirk/Spock or K/S, slash fiction

== Businesses and organizations ==
- Kampfschwimmer, a German postwar commando frogman force
- Kommandittselskap, a Norwegian type of company
- Norwegian Association of Local and Regional Authorities
- Keenspot, a webcomics/webtoons portal founded in March 2000 by cartoonist Chris Crosby
- AirConnect a.k.a. Aeroitalia Regional, a Romanian airline (IATA code KS)
- PenAir, or Peninsula Airways, a defunct airline based in Anchorage, Alaska, US (former IATA code KS)

== Language ==
- Kashmiri language, a Dardic language of Kashmir (ISO 639 alpha-2 language code "ks")
- Kernowek Standard, an orthography for Revived Cornish
- Kiasu, Hokkien (a Chinese spoken variant) word for 'extreme fear of losing' (怕输)
- Sound of the Latin letter X in many languages

== Places ==
- Kansas (US postal abbreviation KS)
- South Kalimantan, Indonesia (ISO 3166-2 province code)
- Krems an der Donau, Austria (vehicle plate code)
- Kassel, Germany (vehicle plate code)
- Khatumo State, an unrecognised proto-state in northern Somalia
- Northampton, Great Britain (vehicle plate code)
- Košice-okolie District, Slovakia (vehicle plate code)

== Science, technology, and mathematics ==
=== Biochemistry ===
- Keratan sulfate, any of several sulfated glycosaminoglycans
- Ketoacyl synthase, a domain of polyketide synthases with a thiol group on a cysteine side-chain

=== Medicine ===
- Kaposi's sarcoma, a tumor caused by Human herpesvirus 8 (HHV8)
- Kartagener syndrome, a genetic disorder
- Kallmann syndrome, a genetic disorder preventing the start or completion of puberty
- Klinefelter's Syndrome, caused by a chromosome aneuploidy

=== Other uses in science, technology, and mathematics ===
- Kernel streaming, a method of processing streamed data
- kilosample (kS), 1000 samples of a digitized signal
- Kilosecond (ks), 1000 seconds (16 minutes, 40 seconds)
- Kolmogorov–Smirnov test, a goodness-of-fit test for probability distributions

== Other uses ==
- Kaplan–Sheinwold, a contract bridge bidding system
- Key Stage, a term used in the British education system
- King's Scholar, at a UK public school (here meaning a kind of private school)
- King's Serjeant, an obsolete UK legal post
- Kashmiri Wikipedia, Wikipedia in the Kashmiri language
- Strikeouts, in baseball
- Contracts, in legal shorthand
- Slovak koruna, the currency of Slovakia 1993–2008 and of the 1939–1945 Slovak State

== See also ==
- K+S, a German chemical company
- The K's, an English indie rock band
- Kays, (disambiguation)
