= Kapital Network International =

Kapital Network International is a regional network of independent accounting and consulting firms in Turkey, Eurasia and the Middle East. Serving small and medium-sized, growth-oriented international businesses in accounting, tax, legal services, human resources, software and consulting.

== History ==
Founded on 29 January 1997 as Kapital Serbest Muhasebeci Mali Müşavirlik Ltd. Şti. in Istanbul and formerly a member of RSM International. The firms under the umbrella name of Kapital Network International are Kapital SMMM Ltd., Kapital Denetim YMM Ltd., and Kapital Online Ltd.
