= KCK (disambiguation) =

KCK is a popular name of Kansas City, Kansas, to differentiate it from Kansas City, Missouri.

KCK may also refer to:

== Transport ==
- Fairfax Municipal Airport, Kansas City, Kansas; defunct
- Kirensk Airport, Irkutsk Oblast, Russia
- Knockholt railway station, London, England

== Other uses ==
- Kalanga language
- Karthik Calling Karthik, a 2010 Hindi-language film
- Kilkenny College, Kilkenny, Ireland
- Kingswood College, Kandy, Sri Lanka
- Kurdistan Communities Union, (Kurdish: Koma Civakên Kurdistan), a Kurdish political organization
