= Filtration coefficient =

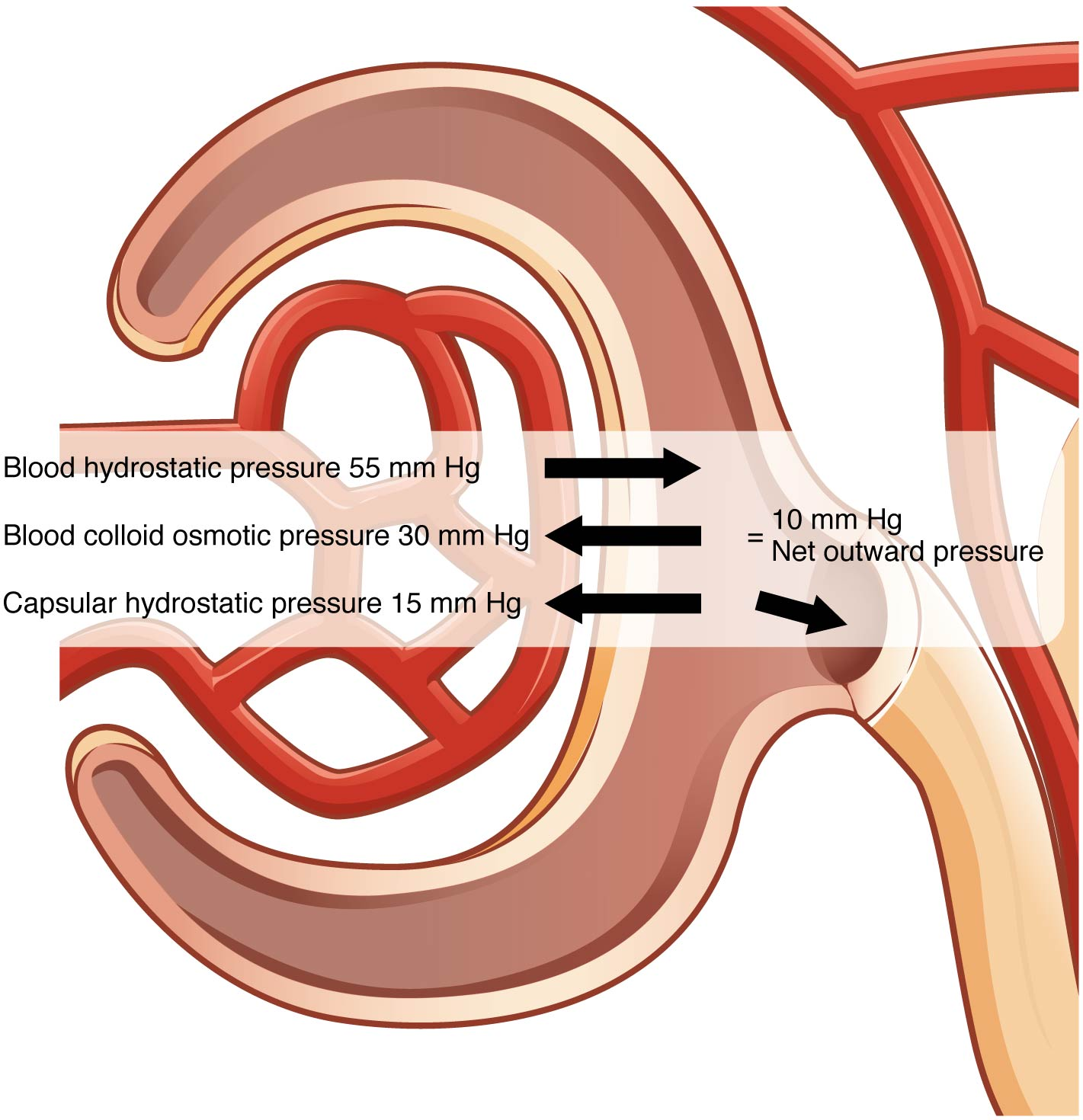
Net filtration pressure in glomerulus of the kidney

In physiology, filtration coefficient (Kf) is the product of a biological membrane's permeability to water and the surface area of the membrane. Typical units of Kf are mL/min/mmHg. The rate of filtration across the membrane is, by definition, the product of Kf and the net filtration pressure across the membrane. Kf is frequently applied to the glomerular capillaries, which filter water into Bowman's capsule to form urine. Typically, in an adult human, the net filtration pressure is 10mmHg and Kf 12.5mL/min/mmHg, giving a glomerular filtration rate (GFR) of 125mL/min. A decrease in Kf due to reduced number of glomeruli or reduced permeability will reduce the GFR at a given filtration pressure
