= KDS (company) =

Travel and holiday companies of France

- Type: Private company
- Industry: Travel industry
- Founded: 1994
- Founder: Yves Weisselberger
- Defunct: 2016
- Fate: Acquired
- Successor: American Express Global Business Travel
- Headquarters: Issy-les-Moulineaux, France
- Area served: Worldwide
- Key people: Roxana Bressy (CEO) (past); Frédéric Stark (CTO) (past)
- Products: Neo, Neo1, SMP, GBT Mobile
- Number of employees: 250+ (2016)
- Parent: American Express Global Business Travel
- Website: www.kds.com

KDS was a French SaaS software provider for online business travel booking and expense management. It was also known as the Neo Technology Group (NTG) after its acquisition by American Express Global Business Travel (GBT) in 2016.

Yves Weisselberger founded the company in 1994 and served as its CEO until 2011. Dean Forbes took the position of CEO after Weisselberger. The company was based in Issy-les-Moulineaux, France with additional locations in Germany, United Kingdom, and the United States of America.

KDS developed Neo, a cloud-based tool which enables business users to search and book complete door-to-door itineraries, instead of the traditional way of booking individual components. Using Neo, employees also manage business expenses through a calendar-based view instead of the common spreadsheet or line-item report approach. They also developed Neo1, GBT Mobile and SMP (Supply MarketPlace). The Neo product line continued under the American Express Global Business Travel ownership.

== History ==
Yves Weisselberger founded KDS in 1994. In 2011, Weisselberger stepped down as CEO and chose Dean Forbes as his replacement. Weisselberger chose Forbes to take his position because of Forbes's outside perspective.

KDS launched Neo, a self-booking tool, in January 2013. The tool was developed on the concept of booking an entire trip from door to door with a departure location, destination, and required time of arrival. The company also partnered with various payment partners to expand payment methods for transactions completed in the booking tool and a variety of travel inventory suppliers beyond air, rail and hotel to connect such as Groundscope, Snapcar, Addison Lee, and Booking.com. In September 2013, KDS signed a five-year contract with Orange, a mobile network operator and internet provider in France, allowing Orange to use Neo for its business.

On January 29, 2014, the company's booking tool gained access to Renfe Operadora's content. KDS gained access after it partnered with SilverRail Technologies. The partnership also gave KDS access to North American rail content via Amtrak and Italy with Trenitalia.

On July 16, 2016, KDS released its latest version of Neo, which for the first time combined the functionality of its legacy corporate booking tool, the door-to-door search and calendar-view introduced in Neo under a completely redesigned consumer-grade user interface.

== Surveys and studies ==
KDS released the results of a survey the company took in 2013 asking business travelers about their company's travel safety. The survey found that 15% of travelers believed that their employers were unaware of their whereabouts, and that an additional 23% regularly booked outside of the company defined booking processes.

Later that year, KDS and EPSA online surveyed 200 employees of companies of all sizes on expense fraud. Results found that 60% of employees thought cheating mileage expenses was justifiable because the system is poorly organized. 85% of participants stated that they had never cheated in their request for the reimbursement of business expenses. The survey also found that employee reimbursement time on average is 17 days and could take up to a month.

In 2016, KDS launched a survey devised to investigate the attitudes, actions and behaviors of UK and U.S. business professionals when booking and managing their work-related travel and reporting travel expenses. The survey questioned over 1,000 participants and revealed that almost one quarter (22%) embellish their business travel expenses by regularly rounding up business mileage claims by 1 and 10 miles per journey.

== Applications ==
KDS developed door-to-door reservations tool Neo to manage travel booking and business travellers. Describing the concept of open booking as "failure dressed up as innovation," Dean Forbes (previous KDS CEO) said KDS will emphasize Neo because he is confident it can sufficiently deter travelers from using alternative, unofficial booking channels. Open booking aims to collect data from bookings that take place on public websites.

KDS launched Neo, a door-to-door corporate booking tool, in January 2013. The tool provides consumers live street view and map overlays while displaying door-to-door itinerary timelines with steps including walking, driving, biking, rail, hotel, flights and dining. In November 2013, Neo had 11 active clients with over 300,000 profiles.

In 2014, KDS developed the Neo expense solution including an optical character recognition tool, that captures data and turns it into text. The tool aims to get rid of the collection of receipts by uploading them to a user's expense system as a line item. The expense system is calendar based to provide users with context on when and how they incurred an expense.

In 2015, the company rolled out the Neo Move mobile app for the iPhone and Apple Watch, branded as an ‘on-trip companion and guide’ by providing the traveler with real-time, location-based information and the ability to scan expense receipts on the go.
