= Ka (Javanese) =

ka
- ꦏ
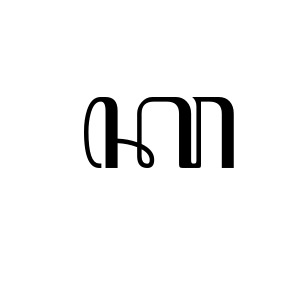
- Aksara nglegena

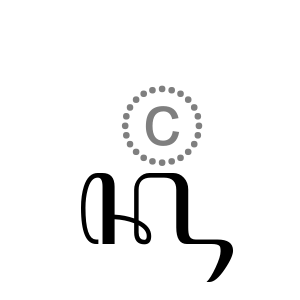
- Aksara pasangan

Usage
- Writing system: Javanese script
- Latin orthography: ka
- Sound values: [k]
- In Unicode: A98F

ꦏ is a syllable in the Javanese script that represents the sound /kɔ/, /ka/. It is transliterated to Latin as "ka", and sometimes in Indonesian orthography as "ko". It has two other forms (pasangan), which are ◌꧀ꦏ and ◌꧀ꦏꦸ (if followed by 'ꦸ' and several other glyphs), but are represented by a single Unicode code point, U+A98F.

== Pasangan ==
Its pasangan form ◌꧀ꦏ, is located on the bottom side of the previous syllable. For example, ꦲꦤꦏ꧀ꦏꦺ - anake (his/her child), which, although transliterated with a single 'k', is written using double 'ꦏ' because the root word ('anak', child) ends in 'ꦏ'.

The pasangan has two forms, the other is used when the pasangan is followed by 'ꦸ', 'ꦹ', 'ꦿ', 'ꦽ', or 'ꦾ'. For example, ꦲꦤꦏ꧀ꦏꦸ - anakku (my child)

== Extended form ==
The letter ꦏ has a murda form, which is ꦑ.

Using cecak telu (ꦏ꦳), the syllable represents Arabic ح (/ħ/ or /x/).

ꦏ with a cerek (ꦐ) is called Ka sasak.

== Glyphs ==
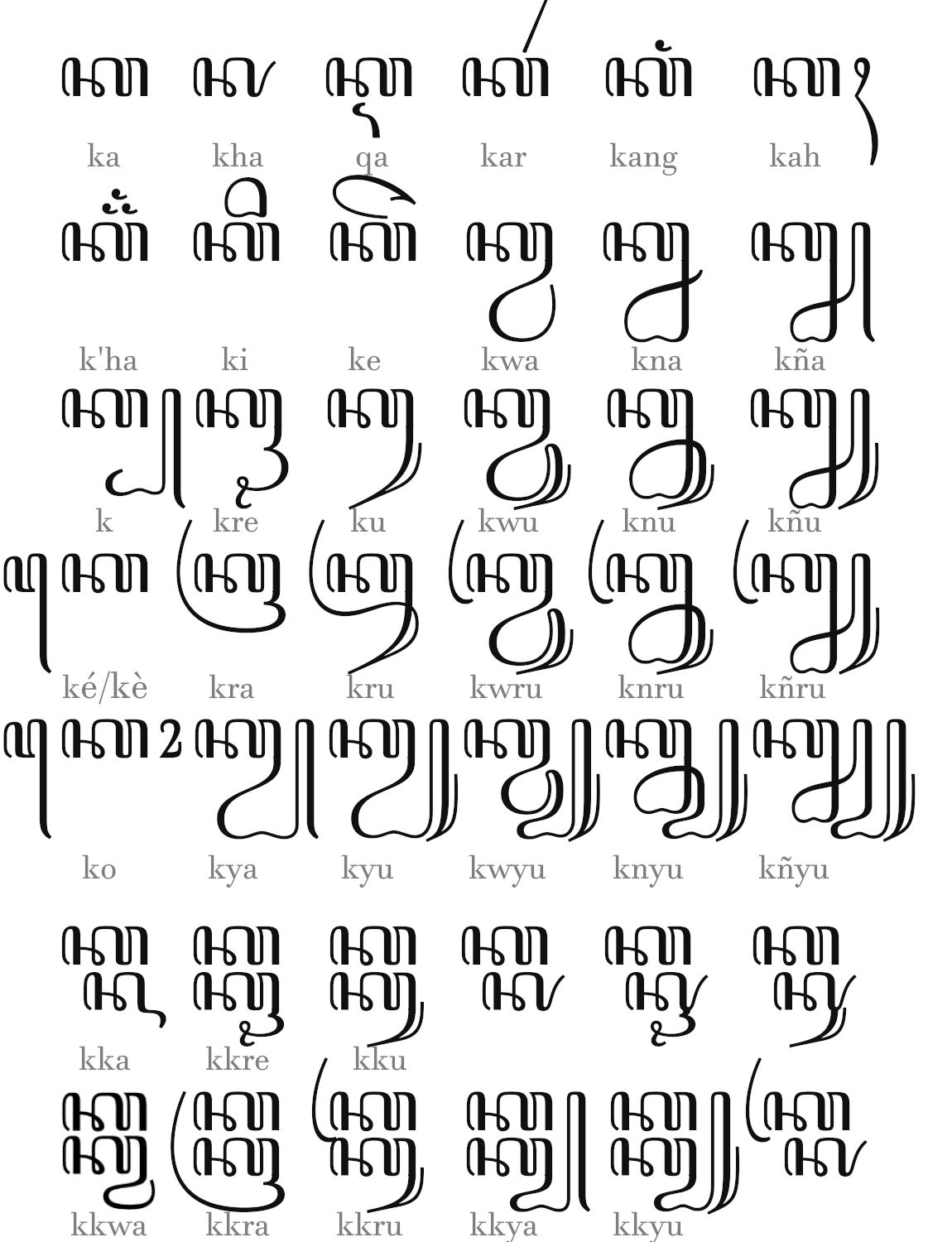
Various glyphs of "ka"

Nglegena forms				Pasangan forms			
ꦏ ka	ꦏꦃ kah	ꦏꦁ kang	ꦏꦂ kar	◌꧀ꦏ -ka	◌꧀ꦏꦃ -kah	◌꧀ꦏꦁ -kang	◌꧀ꦏꦂ -kar
ꦏꦺ ke	ꦏꦺꦃ keh	ꦏꦺꦁ keng	ꦏꦺꦂ ker	◌꧀ꦏꦺ -ke	◌꧀ꦏꦺꦃ -keh	◌꧀ꦏꦺꦁ -keng	◌꧀ꦏꦺꦂ -ker
ꦏꦼ kê	ꦏꦼꦃ kêh	ꦏꦼꦁ kêng	ꦏꦼꦂ kêr	◌꧀ꦏꦼ -kê	◌꧀ꦏꦼꦃ -kêh	◌꧀ꦏꦼꦁ -kêng	◌꧀ꦏꦼꦂ -kêr
ꦏꦶ ki	ꦏꦶꦃ kih	ꦏꦶꦁ king	ꦏꦶꦂ kir	◌꧀ꦏꦶ -ki	◌꧀ꦏꦶꦃ -kih	◌꧀ꦏꦶꦁ -king	◌꧀ꦏꦶꦂ -kir
ꦏꦺꦴ ko	ꦏꦺꦴꦃ koh	ꦏꦺꦴꦁ kong	ꦏꦺꦴꦂ kor	◌꧀ꦏꦺꦴ -ko	◌꧀ꦏꦺꦴꦃ -koh	◌꧀ꦏꦺꦴꦁ -kong	◌꧀ꦏꦺꦴꦂ -kor
ꦏꦸ ku	ꦏꦸꦃ kuh	ꦏꦸꦁ kung	ꦏꦸꦂ kur	◌꧀ꦏꦸ -ku	◌꧀ꦏꦸꦃ -kuh	◌꧀ꦏꦸꦁ -kung	◌꧀ꦏꦸꦂ -kur
ꦏꦿ kra	ꦏꦿꦃ krah	ꦏꦿꦁ krang	ꦏꦿꦂ krar	◌꧀ꦏꦿ -kra	◌꧀ꦏꦿꦃ -krah	◌꧀ꦏꦿꦁ -krang	◌꧀ꦏꦿꦂ -krar
ꦏꦿꦺ kre	ꦏꦿꦺꦃ kreh	ꦏꦿꦺꦁ kreng	ꦏꦿꦺꦂ krer	◌꧀ꦏꦿꦺ -kre	◌꧀ꦏꦿꦺꦃ -kreh	◌꧀ꦏꦿꦺꦁ -kreng	◌꧀ꦏꦿꦺꦂ -krer
ꦏꦽ krê	ꦏꦽꦃ krêh	ꦏꦽꦁ krêng	ꦏꦽꦂ krêr	◌꧀ꦏꦽ -krê	◌꧀ꦏꦽꦃ -krêh	◌꧀ꦏꦽꦁ -krêng	◌꧀ꦏꦽꦂ -krêr
ꦏꦿꦶ kri	ꦏꦿꦶꦃ krih	ꦏꦿꦶꦁ kring	ꦏꦿꦶꦂ krir	◌꧀ꦏꦿꦶ -kri	◌꧀ꦏꦿꦶꦃ -krih	◌꧀ꦏꦿꦶꦁ -kring	◌꧀ꦏꦿꦶꦂ -krir
ꦏꦿꦺꦴ kro	ꦏꦿꦺꦴꦃ kroh	ꦏꦿꦺꦴꦁ krong	ꦏꦿꦺꦴꦂ kror	◌꧀ꦏꦿꦺꦴ -kro	◌꧀ꦏꦿꦺꦴꦃ -kroh	◌꧀ꦏꦿꦺꦴꦁ -krong	◌꧀ꦏꦿꦺꦴꦂ -kror
ꦏꦿꦸ kru	ꦏꦿꦸꦃ kruh	ꦏꦿꦸꦁ krung	ꦏꦿꦸꦂ krur	◌꧀ꦏꦿꦸ -kru	◌꧀ꦏꦿꦸꦃ -kruh	◌꧀ꦏꦿꦸꦁ -krung	◌꧀ꦏꦿꦸꦂ -krur
ꦏꦾ kya	ꦏꦾꦃ kyah	ꦏꦾꦁ kyang	ꦏꦾꦂ kyar	◌꧀ꦏꦾ -kya	◌꧀ꦏꦾꦃ -kyah	◌꧀ꦏꦾꦁ -kyang	◌꧀ꦏꦾꦂ -kyar
ꦏꦾꦺ kye	ꦏꦾꦺꦃ kyeh	ꦏꦾꦺꦁ kyeng	ꦏꦾꦺꦂ kyer	◌꧀ꦏꦾꦺ -kye	◌꧀ꦏꦾꦺꦃ -kyeh	◌꧀ꦏꦾꦺꦁ -kyeng	◌꧀ꦏꦾꦺꦂ -kyer
ꦏꦾꦼ kyê	ꦏꦾꦼꦃ kyêh	ꦏꦾꦼꦁ kyêng	ꦏꦾꦼꦂ kyêr	◌꧀ꦏꦾꦼ -kyê	◌꧀ꦏꦾꦼꦃ -kyêh	◌꧀ꦏꦾꦼꦁ -kyêng	◌꧀ꦏꦾꦼꦂ -kyêr
ꦏꦾꦶ kyi	ꦏꦾꦶꦃ kyih	ꦏꦾꦶꦁ kying	ꦏꦾꦶꦂ kyir	◌꧀ꦏꦾꦶ -kyi	◌꧀ꦏꦾꦶꦃ -kyih	◌꧀ꦏꦾꦶꦁ -kying	◌꧀ꦏꦾꦶꦂ -kyir
ꦏꦾꦺꦴ kyo	ꦏꦾꦺꦴꦃ kyoh	ꦏꦾꦺꦴꦁ kyong	ꦏꦾꦺꦴꦂ kyor	◌꧀ꦏꦾꦺꦴ -kyo	◌꧀ꦏꦾꦺꦴꦃ -kyoh	◌꧀ꦏꦾꦺꦴꦁ -kyong	◌꧀ꦏꦾꦺꦴꦂ -kyor
ꦏꦾꦸ kyu	ꦏꦾꦸꦃ kyuh	ꦏꦾꦸꦁ kyung	ꦏꦾꦸꦂ kyur	◌꧀ꦏꦾꦸ -kyu	◌꧀ꦏꦾꦸꦃ -kyuh	◌꧀ꦏꦾꦸꦁ -kyung	◌꧀ꦏꦾꦸꦂ -kyur

Other forms
Nglegena forms				Pasangan forms			
ꦏ꦳ kʰa	ꦏ꦳ꦃ kʰah	ꦏ꦳ꦁ kʰang	ꦏ꦳ꦂ kʰar	◌꧀ꦏ꦳ -kʰa	◌꧀ꦏ꦳ꦃ -kʰah	◌꧀ꦏ꦳ꦁ -kʰang	◌꧀ꦏ꦳ꦂ -kʰar
ꦏ꦳ꦺ kʰe	ꦏ꦳ꦺꦃ kʰeh	ꦏ꦳ꦺꦁ kʰeng	ꦏ꦳ꦺꦂ kʰer	◌꧀ꦏ꦳ꦺ -kʰe	◌꧀ꦏ꦳ꦺꦃ -kʰeh	◌꧀ꦏ꦳ꦺꦁ -kʰeng	◌꧀ꦏ꦳ꦺꦂ -kʰer
ꦏ꦳ꦼ kʰê	ꦏ꦳ꦼꦃ kʰêh	ꦏ꦳ꦼꦁ kʰêng	ꦏ꦳ꦼꦂ kʰêr	◌꧀ꦏ꦳ꦼ -kʰê	◌꧀ꦏ꦳ꦼꦃ -kʰêh	◌꧀ꦏ꦳ꦼꦁ -kʰêng	◌꧀ꦏ꦳ꦼꦂ -kʰêr
ꦏ꦳ꦶ kʰi	ꦏ꦳ꦶꦃ kʰih	ꦏ꦳ꦶꦁ kʰing	ꦏ꦳ꦶꦂ kʰir	◌꧀ꦏ꦳ꦶ -kʰi	◌꧀ꦏ꦳ꦶꦃ -kʰih	◌꧀ꦏ꦳ꦶꦁ -kʰing	◌꧀ꦏ꦳ꦶꦂ -kʰir
ꦏ꦳ꦺꦴ kʰo	ꦏ꦳ꦺꦴꦃ kʰoh	ꦏ꦳ꦺꦴꦁ kʰong	ꦏ꦳ꦺꦴꦂ kʰor	◌꧀ꦏ꦳ꦺꦴ -kʰo	◌꧀ꦏ꦳ꦺꦴꦃ -kʰoh	◌꧀ꦏ꦳ꦺꦴꦁ -kʰong	◌꧀ꦏ꦳ꦺꦴꦂ -kʰor
ꦏ꦳ꦸ kʰu	ꦏ꦳ꦸꦃ kʰuh	ꦏ꦳ꦸꦁ kʰung	ꦏ꦳ꦸꦂ kʰur	◌꧀ꦏ꦳ꦸ -kʰu	◌꧀ꦏ꦳ꦸꦃ -kʰuh	◌꧀ꦏ꦳ꦸꦁ -kʰung	◌꧀ꦏ꦳ꦸꦂ -kʰur
ꦏ꦳ꦿ kʰra	ꦏ꦳ꦿꦃ kʰrah	ꦏ꦳ꦿꦁ kʰrang	ꦏ꦳ꦿꦂ kʰrar	◌꧀ꦏ꦳ꦿ -kʰra	◌꧀ꦏ꦳ꦿꦃ -kʰrah	◌꧀ꦏ꦳ꦿꦁ -kʰrang	◌꧀ꦏ꦳ꦿꦂ -kʰrar
ꦏ꦳ꦿꦺ kʰre	ꦏ꦳ꦿꦺꦃ kʰreh	ꦏ꦳ꦿꦺꦁ kʰreng	ꦏ꦳ꦿꦺꦂ kʰrer	◌꧀ꦏ꦳ꦿꦺ -kʰre	◌꧀ꦏ꦳ꦿꦺꦃ -kʰreh	◌꧀ꦏ꦳ꦿꦺꦁ -kʰreng	◌꧀ꦏ꦳ꦿꦺꦂ -kʰrer
ꦏ꦳ꦽ kʰrê	ꦏ꦳ꦽꦃ kʰrêh	ꦏ꦳ꦽꦁ kʰrêng	ꦏ꦳ꦽꦂ kʰrêr	◌꧀ꦏ꦳ꦽ -kʰrê	◌꧀ꦏ꦳ꦽꦃ -kʰrêh	◌꧀ꦏ꦳ꦽꦁ -kʰrêng	◌꧀ꦏ꦳ꦽꦂ -kʰrêr
ꦏ꦳ꦿꦶ kʰri	ꦏ꦳ꦿꦶꦃ kʰrih	ꦏ꦳ꦿꦶꦁ kʰring	ꦏ꦳ꦿꦶꦂ kʰrir	◌꧀ꦏ꦳ꦿꦶ -kʰri	◌꧀ꦏ꦳ꦿꦶꦃ -kʰrih	◌꧀ꦏ꦳ꦿꦶꦁ -kʰring	◌꧀ꦏ꦳ꦿꦶꦂ -kʰrir
ꦏ꦳ꦿꦺꦴ kʰro	ꦏ꦳ꦿꦺꦴꦃ kʰroh	ꦏ꦳ꦿꦺꦴꦁ kʰrong	ꦏ꦳ꦿꦺꦴꦂ kʰror	◌꧀ꦏ꦳ꦿꦺꦴ -kʰro	◌꧀ꦏ꦳ꦿꦺꦴꦃ -kʰroh	◌꧀ꦏ꦳ꦿꦺꦴꦁ -kʰrong	◌꧀ꦏ꦳ꦿꦺꦴꦂ -kʰror
ꦏ꦳ꦿꦸ kʰru	ꦏ꦳ꦿꦸꦃ kʰruh	ꦏ꦳ꦿꦸꦁ kʰrung	ꦏ꦳ꦿꦸꦂ kʰrur	◌꧀ꦏ꦳ꦿꦸ -kʰru	◌꧀ꦏ꦳ꦿꦸꦃ -kʰruh	◌꧀ꦏ꦳ꦿꦸꦁ -kʰrung	◌꧀ꦏ꦳ꦿꦸꦂ -kʰrur
ꦏ꦳ꦾ kʰya	ꦏ꦳ꦾꦃ kʰyah	ꦏ꦳ꦾꦁ kʰyang	ꦏ꦳ꦾꦂ kʰyar	◌꧀ꦏ꦳ꦾ -kʰya	◌꧀ꦏ꦳ꦾꦃ -kʰyah	◌꧀ꦏ꦳ꦾꦁ -kʰyang	◌꧀ꦏ꦳ꦾꦂ -kʰyar
ꦏ꦳ꦾꦺ kʰye	ꦏ꦳ꦾꦺꦃ kʰyeh	ꦏ꦳ꦾꦺꦁ kʰyeng	ꦏ꦳ꦾꦺꦂ kʰyer	◌꧀ꦏ꦳ꦾꦺ -kʰye	◌꧀ꦏ꦳ꦾꦺꦃ -kʰyeh	◌꧀ꦏ꦳ꦾꦺꦁ -kʰyeng	◌꧀ꦏ꦳ꦾꦺꦂ -kʰyer
ꦏ꦳ꦾꦼ kʰyê	ꦏ꦳ꦾꦼꦃ kʰyêh	ꦏ꦳ꦾꦼꦁ kʰyêng	ꦏ꦳ꦾꦼꦂ kʰyêr	◌꧀ꦏ꦳ꦾꦼ -kʰyê	◌꧀ꦏ꦳ꦾꦼꦃ -kʰyêh	◌꧀ꦏ꦳ꦾꦼꦁ -kʰyêng	◌꧀ꦏ꦳ꦾꦼꦂ -kʰyêr
ꦏ꦳ꦾꦶ kʰyi	ꦏ꦳ꦾꦶꦃ kʰyih	ꦏ꦳ꦾꦶꦁ kʰying	ꦏ꦳ꦾꦶꦂ kʰyir	◌꧀ꦏ꦳ꦾꦶ -kʰyi	◌꧀ꦏ꦳ꦾꦶꦃ -kʰyih	◌꧀ꦏ꦳ꦾꦶꦁ -kʰying	◌꧀ꦏ꦳ꦾꦶꦂ -kʰyir
ꦏ꦳ꦾꦺꦴ kʰyo	ꦏ꦳ꦾꦺꦴꦃ kʰyoh	ꦏ꦳ꦾꦺꦴꦁ kʰyong	ꦏ꦳ꦾꦺꦴꦂ kʰyor	◌꧀ꦏ꦳ꦾꦺꦴ -kʰyo	◌꧀ꦏ꦳ꦾꦺꦴꦃ -kʰyoh	◌꧀ꦏ꦳ꦾꦺꦴꦁ -kʰyong	◌꧀ꦏ꦳ꦾꦺꦴꦂ -kʰyor
ꦏ꦳ꦾꦸ kʰyu	ꦏ꦳ꦾꦸꦃ kʰyuh	ꦏ꦳ꦾꦸꦁ kʰyung	ꦏ꦳ꦾꦸꦂ kʰyur	◌꧀ꦏ꦳ꦾꦸ -kʰyu	◌꧀ꦏ꦳ꦾꦸꦃ -kʰyuh	◌꧀ꦏ꦳ꦾꦸꦁ -kʰyung	◌꧀ꦏ꦳ꦾꦸꦂ -kʰyur

== Unicode block ==
Javanese script was added to the Unicode Standard in October, 2009 with the release of version 5.2.

Javanese^{[1]}^{[2]} Official Unicode Consortium code chart (PDF)
	0	1	2	3	4	5	6	7	8	9	A	B	C	D	E	F
U+A98x	ꦀ	ꦁ	ꦂ	ꦃ	ꦄ	ꦅ	ꦆ	ꦇ	ꦈ	ꦉ	ꦊ	ꦋ	ꦌ	ꦍ	ꦎ	ꦏ
U+A99x	ꦐ	ꦑ	ꦒ	ꦓ	ꦔ	ꦕ	ꦖ	ꦗ	ꦘ	ꦙ	ꦚ	ꦛ	ꦜ	ꦝ	ꦞ	ꦟ
U+A9Ax	ꦠ	ꦡ	ꦢ	ꦣ	ꦤ	ꦥ	ꦦ	ꦧ	ꦨ	ꦩ	ꦪ	ꦫ	ꦬ	ꦭ	ꦮ	ꦯ
U+A9Bx	ꦰ	ꦱ	ꦲ	꦳	ꦴ	ꦵ	ꦶ	ꦷ	ꦸ	ꦹ	ꦺ	ꦻ	ꦼ	ꦽ	ꦾ	ꦿ
U+A9Cx	꧀	꧁	꧂	꧃	꧄	꧅	꧆	꧇	꧈	꧉	꧊	꧋	꧌	꧍		ꧏ
U+A9Dx	꧐	꧑	꧒	꧓	꧔	꧕	꧖	꧗	꧘	꧙					꧞	꧟
Notes 1.As of Unicode version 17.0 2.Grey areas indicate non-assigned code points

== See also ==
- Ka (Indic)
- Devanagari ka
