= New-Map =

French motor-bike manufacturer

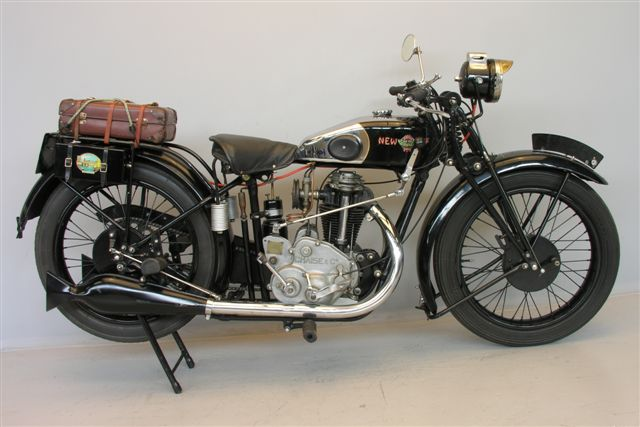
New Map Model BL3 Chaise 350

New-Map is a former French manufacturer of motor-bikes and later, of small cars and delivery vehicles. The business of powered vehicle production was instigated by Paul Martin at the bicycle plant that had been founded by his father, Joseph Martin, at the end of the previous century. The motor-bike and small vehicle business operated from Lyon between 1920 and 1956.

== Motor-bikes ==
The motor-bikes were powered using motors brought in from specialist suppliers such as AMC, Blackburne, J.A.P., MAG and Ydral.

== Cars ==
Between 1938 and 1939, about 90 New Map Baby microcars were produced. They were tiny, extremely simple cars powered by 100 cc engines from Sachs. The cars featured open-topped bodies with space for two. Production ceased due to the war, but resumed again in 1946, as now there was a real need for a car like the Baby, due to the economic state of the country. Since they already had the car designed and the tooling ready to go, the Baby was one of the very first post-war microcars in France. Now it was powered by a 125 cc Aubier-Dunne engine. Contemporary documentation indicates that this was in most respects a rerun of the prewar model featuring, slightly incongruously, a frontal design apparently copied from a Matford. In 1947 production transferred to a new location in Clermont-Ferrand and the car was renamed as the Rolux. They transitioned to the use of 125cc Ydral engines, and later, a 175cc Ydral became available. About 300 cars were built, in total.

== Delivery tricycles ==
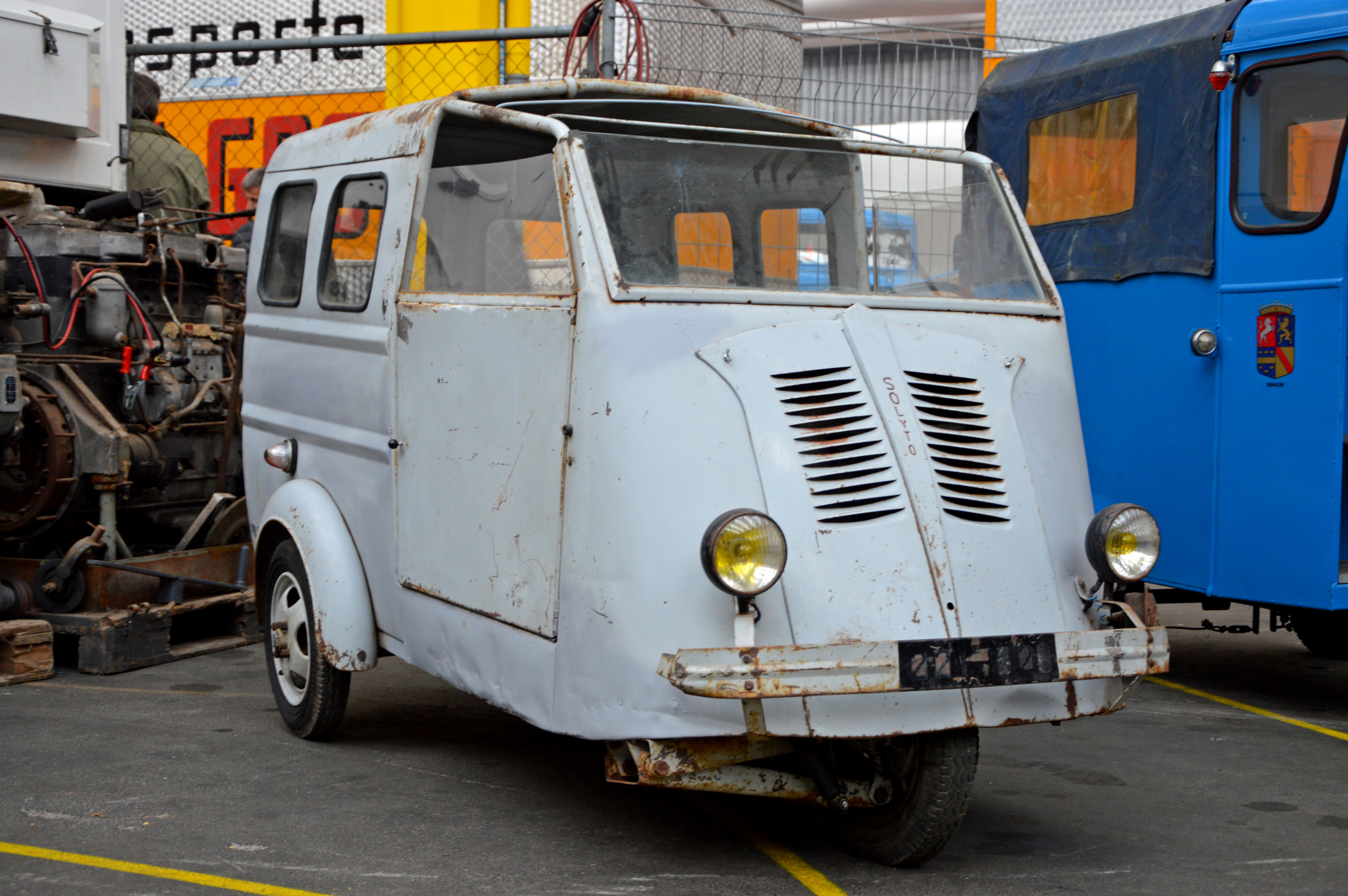
Solyto three wheeler delivery vehicle

Small three-wheeler delivery vehicles were also produced under the Solyto name. Produced from 1952-1974, about 3,000 Solytos were built, in total. Initially they were fitted with a 125cc Ultima engine and 4-speed manual gearbox, with the engine being started by a kickstart-type lever in the engine compartment. In 1960, they switched to a 125cc Sotecma engine, which now featured a pull rope going into the interior to start it, and New Map made their own belt-driven torque converter unit to eliminate the need for a traditional gearbox. In 1964, they had to change engines once again, as they kept running into supply issues. This time, they decided to make their own engines. The cylinder, head, piston, and part of the crankcase were made of Gnome et Rhone D4 components, with the rest being bespoke parts for the new 125cc engine, including a new CDI ignition system. Oddly enough, this made the Solyto the first production car to exclusively use a fully electronic ignition. This engine was paired with the same sort of belt-driven torque converter that they had used with the Sotecma engine. It also initially used the same pull-start setup as the employed on the Sotecma cars, but later, a Dynastart (crankshaft-mounted combination starter-generator unit) was introduced. It could be optioned with either a forward-only Dynastart, or a reversing Dynastart, meaning that the engine could be started in either forward or reverse rotation. This allowed the car to have essentially the same top speed moving forwards or backwards, and this was the first time that a Solyto had any type of reverse. This model was also produced, under licence, in Spain by Delfín.
