= KLS =

KLS may stand for:

- Kalash language (ISO 639 code: kls), a language of Pakistan
- KeAndre Lambert-Smith, American football wide receiver
- Key Largo School, a school in Florida, US
- Khitan large script, an undeciphered Chinese script
- KIIT Law School, Bhubaneswar, India
- Sportswear brand of Kimora Lee Simmons
- Kleine–Levin syndrome, a sleep disorder
- KLS (AM), a radio station call letters, later renamed as KMKY
- Kobalt Label Services, a British record label
- Kolss Cycling Team (UCI code: KLS), a Ukrainian cycling team
- Košarkaška liga Srbije (Cyrillic: Кошаркашка лига Србије), the Basketball League of Serbia
- Kuala Lumpur–Kuala Selangor Expressway, an expressway in Malaysia
- Order of the Lion and the Sun (Knight of Lion and Sun), Iran
- Southwest Washington Regional Airport, US, FAA/IATA airport code
