= KN =

KN or kn may refer to:

== Companies ==
- Kia (2021 logo often misread as KN), a South Korean multinational automobile manufacturer
- Kieler Nachrichten, the only German-language newspaper published in Kiel, Germany
- Kuehne + Nagel, a global transport and logistics company
- K&N Engineering, manufacturer of car parts and consumables

== Language ==
- Kannada (ISO 639-1 code), a Dravidian language
- ⟨kn⟩, the Latin-script digraph used in English to write the word-initial sound /n/

== Science ==
- Complete graph (K_{n}), a simple undirected graph in which every pair of distinct vertices is connected by a unique edge
- Kilonewton (kN), a common expression of forces measured in newtons (N)
- Knot (unit), a unit of speed equal to one nautical mile per hour
- Knudsen number (Kn), a dimensionless number

== Other uses ==
- .kn, the Internet country code top-level domain for Saint Kitts and Nevis
- Croatian kuna (kn), the currency of Croatia from 30 May 1994 until 31 December 2022
- KN number, used by the United States for describing North Korean missiles
- Saint Kitts and Nevis (ISO 3166 code), an island country and microstate
- Kelly's Navy, referring to John Kelly Limited fleet, and book under the same name
- Kitchen Nightmares, an American reality television series
  - Ramsay's Kitchen Nightmares, the original British version of the show
    - Various other international editions: see Ramsay's Kitchen Nightmares § International versions
