= KSM =

KSM may refer to:

- Kernel same-page merging, sharing identical computer memory pages among processes
- Khalid Sheikh Mohammed, terrorist held at Guantanamo Bay
- Kothagudem School of Mines, later University College of Engineering, Kakatiya University, India
- Kommando Spezialkräfte Marine, special forces of the German Navy
- Komunistický svaz mládeže or Communist Youth Union, the youth wing of the Communist Party of Bohemia and Moravia
- Kerr Sulphurets Mitchell, an active mine exploration project in British Columbia
- KSM (band), an American all-girl rock band
- KPH (radio station), by alternative callsign
- St. Mary's Airport (Alaska), by airport code
- Kosmos Airlines, by airline code
- KSM, a series of microphones by Shure
