= KPV (disambiguation) =

KPV is a heavy machine gun.

KPV or kpv may also refer to:

- KPV Kokkola or Kokkolan Palloveikot, an association football club from Kokkola, Finland
- Kashipur Junction railway station's Indian Railway station code
- Komi-Zyrian language's ISO 639 code
- Perryville Airport's IATA code
- KPV LV, a political party in Latvia
- KPV tripeptide, a peptide used in skin care products
