= KSI (disambiguation) =

KSI (born 1993; Olajide Olatunji) is a British YouTube personality, musician and professional boxer.

KSI or Ksi may also refer to:

- Killed or seriously injured, in road safety
- Kontoret för särskild inhämtning ("Office for Special Collection"), a Swedish intelligence agency
- The Korean Studies Institute, a research institution on Korean studies in South Korea
- Korey Stringer Institute, a not-for-profit organization focused on exertional heat stroke in sports
- KSI Industries, a fictional company in Transformers: Age of Extinction
- KSI, IATA code for Kissidougou Airport in Guinea
- Icelandic: Knattspyrnusamband Íslands (Football Association of Iceland), Icelandic sports group
- ksi (unit), kilopound per square inch, a non-SI unit of stress or pressure
- Ksi (Cyrillic), a letter of the early Cyrillic alphabet (Ѯ, ѯ) derived from the Greek letter Xi

== See also ==
- The Greek letter Ξ/ξ, pronounced [ksi] in Greek
