= Ka (Devanagari) =

- क

Usage
- Writing system: Devanagari script
- Type: Abugida
- Language of origin: Sanskrit
- Sound values: [kɐ]
- In Unicode: U+0915

History
- Development: क
- Time period: 7th century
- Descendants: ક; 𑘎

Other
- Writing direction: Left-to-Right

Ka (क k) (कवर्ण kavarṇa) is the first consonant of the Devanagari abugida. It ultimately arose from the Brahmi letter 𑀓, after having gone through the Gupta letter. Letters that derive from it are the Gujarati letter ક, and the Modi letter 𑘎.

== Usage ==
In all languages, क is pronounced as [kə] or [k] when appropriate. In the following example, क implements its inherent vowel, the schwa:

- नक़ली = naqali [nəqəliː] "fake"

In this example, क deletes the inherent schwa for correct pronunciation:

- बकवास = bakvās [bəkʋaːs] "nonsense"

क with vowel diacritics

Certain words that have been borrowed from Persian and Arabic implement the nukta to more properly approximate the original word. It is then transliterated as a q.

- क़दम = qadam [qəd̪əm] "footstep"

=== Conjuncts with क ===
- क + त(t̪) gives us क्त kt̪ with a somewhat irregular form.

- क + ष(ʂ) gives us the fully ligated क्ष kʂ with a very irregular form.

- ङ(ŋ) + क gives us the vertical conjunct ङ्क ŋk with the ङ placed above the क.

- क + ख(kʰ) gives us क्ख kkʰ with the क placed above the ख.
- क + क gives us क्क with the क placed above another क.

- क + ल(l̪) gives us क्ल kl̪ with the क placed above the ल.

- क + व(ʋ) gives us क्व kʋ with the क placed above the व.

- क + न(n̪) gives us क्न kn̪ with the न rotated and placed under the hook of the क.

- क + र [ɾ] is a fully ligated (irregular) conjunct

== Mathematics ==
=== Āryabhaṭa numeration ===
Aryabhata used Devanagari letters for numbers, very similar to that of the Greeks, even after the invention of Indian numerals. The values of the different forms of क are:

- क [kɐ] = 1 (१)
- कि [kɪ] = 100 (१००)
- कु [kʊ] = 10,000 (१० ०००)
- कृ [kɽɪ] = 1,000,000 (१० ०० ०००)
- कॢ [klɪ] = 10×10^{8} (१०^{८})
- के [keː] = 10×10^{10} (१०^{१०})
- कै [kai] = 10×10^{12} (१०^{१२})
- को [koː] = 10×10^{14} (१०^{१४})
- कौ [kau] = 10×10^{16} (१०^{१६})

== Tabla Strokes ==
क (ka) also seen as कि (ki), or के (ke). This is usually a flat, nonresonant stroke of the left hand. The heel of the hand is left on the drum, while the hand rotates to hit the drum, with the focus of the force being focused between the tips and first joints of the fingers.

== Hindu astrology ==
के (ke) is the abbreviation used for केतु (Ketu), the descending lunar node. In Hindu astrology Ketu represents karmic collections both good and bad, spirituality and supernatural influences. Ketu is associated with the Matsya Avatar (Fish Incarnation) of Vishnu. Ketu signifies the spiritual process of the refinement of materialization to spirit and is considered both malefic and benefic, as it causes sorrow and loss, and yet at the same time turns the individual to God. In other words, it causes material loss in order to force a more spiritual outlook in the person. Ketu is a karaka or indicator of intelligence, wisdom, non-attachment, fantasy, penetrating insight, derangement, and psychic abilities. Ketu is believed to bring prosperity to the devotee's family, removes the effects of snakebite and illness arising out of poisons. He grants good health, wealth and cattle to his devotees.

== See also ==
- Ka (Javanese)
- Ka (Egyptian soul), ancient Egyptian concept of spirit or soul
