= Rolux =

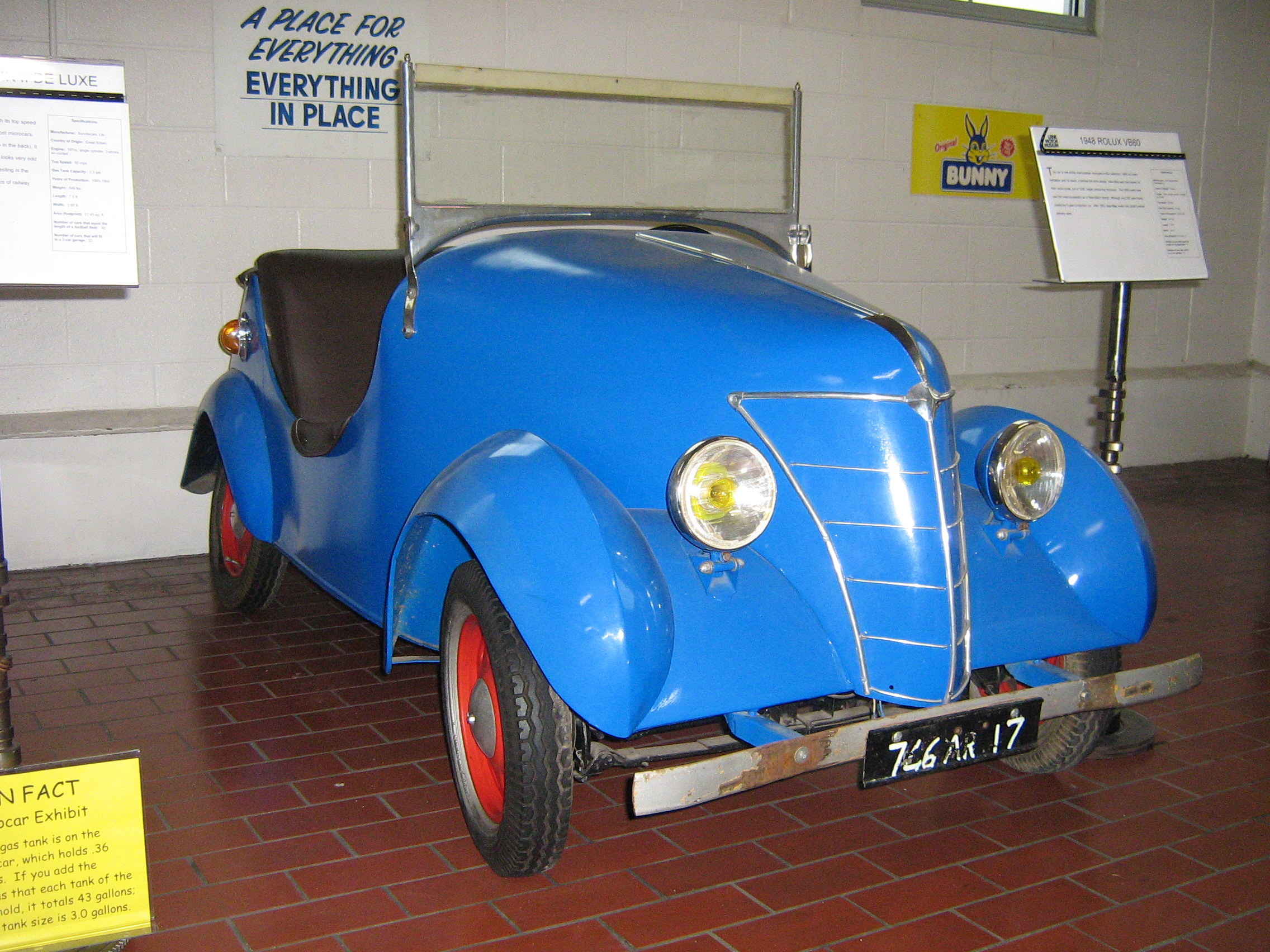
1948 Rolux VB60

The Rolux was a French automobile manufactured from 1938 until 1952.

The product of a Lyon company better known for making the New-Map motorcycle, the light car, also sold as a New Map, had a single-cylinder, air-cooled, two-stroke, 100 cc engine made by Fichtel and Sachs. The engine was mounted behind the driver with chain drive to the back axle. The body was an open two-seater with no doors.

In 1947 production moved to Clermont-Ferrand, and the company was renamed as Société Rolux, and the car became the Rolux VB60 or Baby. In 1950 the engine, now by Ydral, grew to 125 cc and a 175 cc version, the VB61 was also introduced. A proposed closed car was shown in 1946 but never reached production. Car manufacture stopped in 1952 after about 300 were made, but the company, renamed to Société de Construction du Centre and moving to Puy de Dome, continued making motorcycles and some small 3-wheeled vans.
