= Kapitalanlagegesetzbuch =

German Investment Code for investment management

KAGB Kapitalanlagegesetzbuch (German Investment Code)
- Enacted by the Bundestag (German Federal Parliament)
- Passed: May 16, 2013
- Commenced: July 22, 2013

The Kapitalanlagegesetzbuch, abbreviated as KAGB, is the German Investment Code for investment management.

== History ==
The KAGB was approved May 16, 2013, by the Bundestag, the German Federal Parliament, and became effective July 22, 2013. The KAGB replaced the Investmentgesetz (InvG), the German Investment Act (de), which had been created by the Investment Modernization Act. The InvG was adopted December 15, 2005, and expired July 21, 2013. Among other things, the KAGB integrated regulations to cover numerous new investment products (alternative investments), including derivatives. Its objective is to standardization investor protections and curb grey markets, with respect to updating and aligning with the European Union.

As an example of part of its scope, KAGB Section 17 (of 359) defines a Kapitalverwaltungsgesellschaft (KVG) (de), which, in English, is a German Investment Management Company. A KVG must have a registered office and head office in Germany that manages a German investment fund, or European Union investment fund, or Special Foreign Alternative Investment Fund (AIF). The fund may be structured as an Undertakings for Collective Investment in Transferable Securities (UCITS) under the UCITS Directive or a Special alternative investment fund (AIF) under the AIFM Directive.

=== Prior German investment acts ===
1957: Gesetz über Kapitalanlagegesellschaften (KAGG), the Capital Investment Companies Act of 1957 (KAGG)
2005–2013: Investmentgesetz (InvG), the German Investment Act (de)

== Regulatory authority ==
The German regulatory authority that enforces the code is called the Bundesanstalt für Finanzdienstleistungsaufsicht, or BaFin for short, which translates to "Federal Financial Supervisory Authority."

== Translation ==
Kapitalanlagegesetzbuch is a quadruple-word German compound noun.

English translation
Kapital	=	capital
Anlage	=	investment
Gesetz	=	law
Buch	=	book (or code)

== Complete text (in German) ==
- KAGB text, via buzer.de (de)

== See also ==
- Alternative Investment Fund Managers Directive 2011
- BVI, short for Bundesverband Investment und Asset Management e.V. (de), translates to Federal Association Investment and Asset Management, a registered association under German law (e.V. = Eingetragener Verein). The BVI represents the interests of the German investment management industry at national and international levels. It was founded March 25, 1970, in Frankfurt, by seven German companies.
- KAGB (interwiki link to wiktionary)
