= KCL =

KCL or KCl may refer to:

== Education ==
- King's College London, a public research university in London, UK and a constituent college of the University of London

== Science and technology ==
- Potassium chloride (KCl), a metal halide salt
- Keycode lookup, keycode log, or keycode list
- Kirchhoff's current law, in physics
- Kyoto Common Lisp, an implementation of Common Lisp
