= KVT =

KVT may refer to:

- kvt, the ISO 639-3 code for Lahta language
- Kendriya Vidyalaya Tirumalagiri, one of the schools in Secunderabad city of Telangana, India
