= KMF =

KMF may refer to:

- Comorian franc, currency of Comoros by ISO 4217 currency code
- Kabul Medical University, formerly the Kabul Medical Faculty
- Kare language (Papuan), ISO 639-3 language code
- Karnataka Milk Federation, a state-level milk federation in India
- Kevoree Modeling Framework, a model driven engineering framework that generates code from models
- Khmer Mekong Films, a Cambodian film and video production company
- KMF Ekonomac Kragujevac, a futsal club based in Kragujevac, Serbia
- Knightmare Frame, mecha from Sunrise anime Code Geass
- Korea Muslim Federation, a religious organization based in South Korea
- KMF, a 2016 album by Norwegian indie rock band Kakkmaddafakka
