= KAF =

KAF, Kaf or Kafs may refer to:

== Places ==
- Mount Qaf or Kaf, a mythical place in medieval Islamic cosmology
- Kaf, a city in Al Jawf Province, Saudi Arabia
- Kandahar International Airport or Kandahar Air Field (KAF), near Kandahar, Afghanistan

== Organisations ==
- Communist Workers League (Sweden) (Swedish: Kommunistiska Arbetarförbundet), a Swedish Trotskyist political party now called the Socialist Party
- Kalki Avatar Foundation, a spiritualist organisation based in London, UK
- Korean Alpine Federation, a member of the International Ski Mountaineering Federation
- Kyrgyz Air (ICAO code), a privately owned airline based in Kyrgyzstan
- Kyrgyz American Foundation
- Karato Airport (IATA code), Papua New Guinea; See List of airports by IATA code: K
- Korean Anarchist Federation, see Anarchism in Korea

=== Military ===
- Kenya Air Force, the national Air Force of Kenya
- Khmer National Air Force, the air force branch of the Khmer National Armed Forces, the official military of the Khmer Republic during the Cambodian Civil War between 1970 and 1975
- Kosovo Armed Forces
- Kuwait Air Force, the national Air Force of Kuwait
- Kandahar Air Field

=== People ===
- Kaf (singer), a Japanese singer-songwriter and virtual YouTuber

== Other uses ==
- KAF-10500, a CCD imaging sensor
- Kafs, people born in Réunion of Malagasy and/or African origins
- Kaph or kaf, the eleventh letter of many Semitic abjads
