= Kys (Caria) =

Town of ancient Caria

Coordinates: 37°25′44″N 28°25′25″E

Kys, or Kanebion, also known as Palaiapolis, was a town of ancient Caria.

Its site is located near Bellibol in Asiatic Turkey.
