= Kor-e Sofla =

Kor-e Sofla كرسفلي
- Village
- Location within Iran
- Coordinates: 38°44′55″N 46°57′06″E
- Country: Iran
- Province: East Azerbaijan
- County: Kaleybar
- Bakhsh: Central
- Rural District: Peyghan Chayi

Population (2006)
  - Total: 31
- Time zone: UTC+3:30 (IRST)
  - Summer (DST): UTC+4:30 (IRDT)

Kor-e Sofla (Persian: كرسفلي, also Romanized as Kor-e Soflá; also known as Kowr-e Pā'īn and Kūr) is a village in Peyghan Chayi Rural District, in the Central District of Kaleybar County, East Azerbaijan Province, Iran. At the 2006 census, its population was 31, in 7 families.
