= KIR =

KIR, Kir or kir may refer to:

== Biology ==
- Inward-rectifier potassium channel K_{ir}
- Killer-cell immunoglobulin-like receptor, a receptor protein expressed on the surface of natural killer cells and some T-cells

== Bodies of water ==
- Kir (river), in northern Albania
- Kir Lake, near Dijon, France

== People ==
- Kir Fard, Armenian nobleman of the 12th–13th centuries
- Kir Nesis (1934–2003), Russian biologist
- Kir Bulychev, Russian writer
- Félix Kir (1876–1968), priest in the French Resistance
- Kir, a character in Detective Conan

== Places ==
- Republic of Kiribati in the central Pacific (ISO code: KIR)
- Kir of Moab, biblical stronghold
- Land of Kir, biblical location

== Transport ==
- Katihar Junction railway station, Bihar; station code KIR
- Kerry Airport, Ireland (IATA code: KIR)
- Kirkby railway station, Merseyside, England; National Rail station code KIR

== Other ==
- Kir (cocktail), alcoholic beverage
- Kyrgyz language (ISO code: kir)
- Krajowa Izba Rozliczeniowa, an automated clearing house in Poland

== See also ==
- Kirs (disambiguation)
- Kyr
