= KQ =

KQ may refer to:

== Media ==
- The King of Queens, a sitcom
- King's Quest, a video game series by Sierra Entertainment
- "Killer Queen", a song by Queen

== Other uses ==
- Kenya Airways (IATA airline designator)
- Kevin Quiambao, Filipino basketball player
- Kingman Reef (FIPS PUB 10-4 territory code)
