= KWT =

KWT may refer to:

- KWT Global - public relations agency
- KWT Railway - former short line railroad (Kentucky West Tennessee)
- Kilowatt
- Kuwait
- Kwesten language
- Kwethluk Airport
- Kwun Tong station, an MTR station in Kwun Tong, Hong Kong
- Kristyn Wong-Tam
