= KZT =

KZT may refer to:

- Kazakhstani tenge (ISO 4217: KZT), the currency of Kazakhstan
- Kuzhithura railway station (Station code: KZT), a railway station in Kanyakumari, Tamil Nadu, India
