= KBO (disambiguation) =

The KBO League is a professional baseball league in South Korea.

KBO may also refer to:

- Kapamilya Box Office, a Philippine defunct free-to-air television channel
- Communist League of Austria (KBÖ, German: Kommunistischer Bund Österreichs)
- KBO!, a hardcore punk band from Serbia
- Kuiper belt object(s) or KBO(s), objects beyond Neptune in the Solar System (including Pluto)
- Keep the Bastards Out, a fictional organization invented by Seattle Post-Intelligencer columnist Emmett Watson
- Korea Baseball Organization, the governing body for professional baseball in South Korea
- Kosi Bird Observatory, Nepal
- Keliko language (ISO 639: kbo) in DR Congo and South Sudan
- Kabalo Airport (IATA code: KBO), an airport in the Democratic Republic of the Congo

== See also ==
- KBOS (disambiguation)
