= Das Kapital (disambiguation) =

Das Kapital is a foundational theoretical text in materialist philosophy, economics and politics written by Karl Marx.

Das Kapital may also refer to:

- DAAS Kapital (1991–1992), an Australian comedy television series starring the Doug Anthony All Stars
- Das Capital (album) (2003), an album by Luke Haines
- Das Kapital (album) (2010), an album by Capital Inicial
