= KZN =

KZN may refer to:

- KwaZulu-Natal, a province of South Africa
- Kantonsschule Zürich Nord, a school in Switzerland
- Kazan International Airport, Tatarstan, Russia (IATA code: KZN)
- KSL (AM), Utah, United States (original call sign: KZN)
