= KW (disambiguation) =

kW is an abbreviation for kiloWatt, a unit of power.

KW, kW or kw may also refer to:

== Arts and media ==
- KW (album), 1998 album by Keith Washington
- K.W., a character in the 2009 film Where the Wild Things Are

== Businesses ==
- Kamera-Werkstätten, a German camera manufacturer
- Keller Williams Realty, an American real estate company
- Kenworth, an American truck manufacturer
- Kompania Węglowa, a Polish coal mining company
- KW – Das Heizkraftwerk, a former nightclub in Munich, Germany
- KW automotive, a German automobile parts and suspension manufacturer

== Computing ==
- .kw, the country code top level domain (ccTLD) for Kuwait
- Keyword (Internet search)
- Kiloword, a memory size increment

== Language ==
- Cornish language (ISO 639-1 code)
- Kw (digraph), in the Latin alphabet

== Places ==
- Key West, Florida, United States
- KW postcode area, covering Kirkwall and Orkney, United Kingdom
- Kitchener–Waterloo, Ontario, Canada
- Kuwait (ISO 3166-1 country code KW)

== Other uses ==
- Kwangwoon University, in Seoul, South Korea
- K_{w}, the self-ionization constant of water; see self-ionization of water
- National Herbarium of Ukraine (short code KW)
