= KNA =

KNA may refer to:

- Saint Kitts and Nevis
- Karen National Army
- Knaresborough railway station
- Korean National Airlines (defunct)
- Korean National Association
- Kuki National Army
- Kurdistan National Assembly
- Kuwait National Assembly
- The alternate stage name of the Ethiopian-American musician, Kenna Zemedkun, also known as Kenna.
