= KSU =

KSU may refer to:

== Universities ==
- Kansas State University in Manhattan, Kansas, US
- Kennesaw State University in Kennesaw, Georgia, US
- Kent State University in Kent, Ohio, US
- Kentucky State University in Frankfort, Kentucky, US
- Kahramanmaraş Sütçü İmam University in Kahramanmaraş, Turkey
- Kazan State University in Kazan, Russia
- King Saud University in Riyadh, Saudi Arabia
- Kun Shan University in Tainan, Taiwan

== Other uses ==
- Kansas City Southern (company), as the NYSE ticker symbol
- A key service unit or panel of the 1A2 Key Telephone System
- Kristiansund Airport, Kvernberget, Norway by IATA code
- KSU (band), a 1970s punk rock band from Poland
- Kunsill Studenti Universitarji, a Maltese students' union
- Kerala Students' Union, the students’ wing of the Indian National Congress in Kerala.
- Former callsign of Stanford University radio station KZSU
