= KX =

KX and variants may refer to:

== Businesses and brands ==
- Pentax KX, a 35mm film SLR camera model
- Pentax K-x, a digital SLR camera model
- Cayman Airways (IATA code KX)
- KX Television, a network of four CBS affiliates under flagship KXMC-TV
- Kx Systems, a software company focused on real-time analytics
- KX 91.5. Philippines, a brand name for DXKX

== Other uses ==
- Family K^{x}, a large group of the New Testament manuscripts
- Kings Cross railway station, London
- ⟨k͡x⟩, symbol for the voiceless velar affricate in the International Phonetic Alphabet

== See also ==
- 9945 Karinaxavier or 1990 KX, an asteroid
