= KPW =

KPW may refer to:

- North Korean won (KPW), officially "Korean people's won", the currency of North Korea
- Kobon language, native to Papua New Guinea, ISO 639 code kpw
