= Kin, Pakistan =

Kin
- village
- Kīn
- Location within Pakistan
- Coordinates: 28°37′55″N 69°53′18″E
- Country: Pakistan
- Province: Punjab
- District: Rajanpur
- Time zone: UTC+5 (PST)

Kin is a village in Rajanpur District, Punjab, of central Pakistan. It is located on the western side (right bank) of the Indus River at the edge of the flood plain. Kin is in the Mazāri tribal area and under the jurisdiction of the Shaikhwāli Police Post. It is about halfway between Rajanpur to the northeast, and Kashmore to the southwest just off of the Indus Highway (N55).
