= KHM =

KHM could refer to:

- Khamti Airport, IATA airport code
- Khmer language, ISO 639 code
- Cambodia, ISO 3166-1 alpha-3 code
- KHM (band), later the Clayborne Family

KHM is an abbreviation of:

- King's Harbour Master
- Kinder-und Hausmärchen, code for stories in Grimms' Fairy Tales
- Kulturhistorisk Museum, University of Oslo, Norway
- Kunsthistorisches Museum, Vienna, Austria
- Academy of Media Arts Cologne (Kunsthochschule für Medien Köln), art and film school of the state of North Rhine Westphalia, Germany
