= KCN =

KCN may refer to:

- The Nubi language of Uganda and Kenya has ISO 639-3 code kcn
- Potassium cyanide has chemical formula KCN
- Kent Community Network, broadband provider
