= KDZ =

KDZ or Kdz may refer to:

- Kdz. Ereğli Belediye Spor, a Turkish football team
- Kunduz Province (ISO 3166-2:AF-KDZ), Afghanistan
- Mfumte language (ISO 639-3:kdz), spoken in Cameroon
- Korean Demilitarized Zone, the border between North and South Korea
