= Little Baby Face Foundation =

American children's charity

- Founder: Dr. Thomas Romo III
- Location(s): 135 East 74th Street; NY, NY 10021
- Services: Reconstructive surgery
- Website: www.littlebabyface.org

The Little Baby Face Foundation is a New York City-based charitable organization whose goal is to provide free cosmetic surgery for children born with facial deformities, and/or who are bullied because of their appearance. Critics have charged that the Foundation's treatment of non-pathological cases overemphasize changing the bullied rather than the bullies.

The Little Baby Face Foundation was founded in 2002, based on a new model of treatment to help children born with facial deformities, and features such as protruding ears. Rather than traveling to third world countries for the treatment of a limited number of conditions, LBFF brings children with facial deformities and imperfections to facilities in New York, where physicians and surgeons volunteer their services.

The Little Baby Face Foundation qualifies as a 501(c)(3) nonprofit by the Internal Revenue Service.

== See also ==
- Pediatrics
