= KH =

KH, kh, Kh or kH may refer to:

== Organizations ==
- Kata'ib Hezbollah, part of the armed forces of Iraq
- The King's Hospital, a school in Ireland
- Kowloon Hospital, a hospital in Kowloon City, Hong Kong

== People ==
- Kamal Haasan, Indian actor and filmmaker, sometimes abbreviated as KH in film titles (cf. KH 233)
- Kalevi Heikkinen (1911–1940), Finnish war correspondent whose pen name was KH

== Places ==
- Cambodia (Kampuchea, Kambuja, Srok Khmer), a sovereign state with ISO 3166-2 alpha code KH
  - .kh, the Internet country code top-level domain for Cambodia
- Kutná Hora District, Czech Republic (vehicle plate code)
- Kyustendil, Bulgaria (vehicle plate code)
- Bad Kreuznach, Germany (vehicle plate code)
- Borehamwood, Great Britain (vehicle plate code)
- Central Kalimantan, Indonesia (vehicle registration prefix KH)
- Evrytania, Greece (vehicle plate code)

== Science and technology ==
=== Chemistry and physics ===
- KH (hardness), a measure of the hardness of water (calcium carbonate concentration)
- Henry's law, constant (K_{H}), in thermodynamics
- Kelvin–Helmholtz instability, a phenomenon of fluid mechanics
- Potassium hydride, chemical formula KH

=== Other uses in science and technology ===
- Kh factor, a constant used in electrical metering
- Key Hole, a series of imaging satellites used by various US agencies
- Khornerstone, a computer benchmark used in periodicals such as UNIX Review
- Kurepa hypothesis, in mathematical set theory
- Missiles etc. with prefix Kh-, indicating experimental; see List of NATO reporting names for air-to-surface missiles

== Other uses ==
- Kh (digraph), in English transliteration, usually representing [x], but sometimes [kʰ]
- Kh (tramcar), the class of double axled high-floor tramcars
- A knight of the Royal Guelphic Order
