= VK =

VK, Vk or vk may refer to:

== Arts and entertainment ==
- Visual kei, a movement among Japanese musicians
- Voight-Kampff machine, in the science fiction film Blade Runner
- de Volkskrant, a Dutch daily newspaper
- Vedanta Kesari, an English-language monthly magazine in India

== Companies ==
- VK (company), a Russian internet company
  - VK (service), a Russian social network
- VK Mobile, a Korean mobile phone manufacturer
- Air Nigeria (former IATA code: VK), a 2004–2012 airline
- Level Europe (former IATA code: VK), a 2017–2020 Austrian airline

== Science and technology ==
- Akai VK, a portable helical scan EIA video VTR
- Holden Commodore (VK), a 1984–1986 model of GM Holden's Commodore car
- Vulkan, a 3D graphics and computing standard

== Other uses ==
- VK (drink), an alcopop sold in the UK
- Versuchskampffahrzeug, a designation of some German tanks
- Vertical kilometer, an uphill mountain running race
- VK, the prefix of amateur radio call signs allocated to Australian operators

== See also ==
- Cirrus VK-30, an American homebuilt aircraft
- VKS (disambiguation)
