= KM =

KM, Km, or km may stand for:

== Businesses ==
- KM Group, a multimedia group based in Kent
- Kennis Music, a record label
- Kia Motors, an automobile manufacturer
- Kmart (former stock symbol "KM")
- Konica Minolta, a manufacturer of electronics
- KM Malta Airlines, the flag carrier of Malta

== Organisations ==
- Kabataang Makabayan, a youth organization in the Philippines
- Kerry Militia, military organization of volunteer soldiers from County Kerry in Ireland
- Knight of Malta (disambiguation), a Christian order of knighthood
- Kaiserliche Marine, navy of the German Empire
- Kriegsmarine, name of the German navy during the Nazi regime
- Koninklijke Marine, Dutch name of the Royal Netherlands Navy
- Kraljevska mornarica, navy for the Kingdom of Yugoslavia

== Places ==
- Kamenz (district), Germany (license plate indication)
- Messenia, Greece (license plate indication)
- KM Junction, West Virginia
- Comoros, country (ISO 3166-1 code KM)
- Kysucké Nové Mesto, town in Slovakia (district code KM)
- Kosovska Mitrovica, town in Serbia
- Kosovo and Metohija, an autonomous province in Serbia (ISO 3166-2 code RS-KM)

== Science, technology, and mathematics ==
- Kilometre (km), SI unit of distance
- .km, Internet top-level domain (ccTLD) for Comoros
- Km, an electric motor constant
- Kaplan–Meier estimator, a non-parametric statistic used to estimate the survival function
- Kelley–Morse set theory, in mathematics, a set theory
- Kernel methods, a set of computer science algorithms
- K_{M}, the Michaelis constant in Michaelis–Menten kinetics
- Knowledge management, a range of techniques to identify, represent, and distribute knowledge
- KM-mount, a Konica camera rangefinder mount
- KM, a Soviet ground-effect vehicle, nicknamed the "Caspian Sea Monster"

== Other uses ==
- Km (hieroglyph)
- Kapal motor (motor vessel) in Indonesian ship naming conventions
- Kevin Matthews (wrestler), Kevin Matthew McDonald (b. 1983)
- Khmer language (ISO 639 alpha-2 code "km")
- Bosnia and Herzegovina convertible mark, currency of Bosnia and Herzegovina
- Knight of the Sovereign Military Order of Malta, a chivalric order
- Krause-Mishler numbers for the Standard Catalog of World Coins
