= Kul =

Kul or KUL may refer to:

== Airports ==
- KUL, current IATA code for Kuala Lumpur International Airport, Malaysia
- KUL, former IATA code for Sultan Abdul Aziz Shah Airport (Subang Airport), Malaysia

== Populated places ==
- Kul, Iran, a village in Kurdistan Province
- Külköy, a village in Uşak Province, Turkey

== Universities ==
- John Paul II Catholic University of Lublin (Katolicki Uniwersytet Lubelski), Poland
- Kingston University London, England
- Katholieke Universiteit Leuven, (Katholieke Universiteit Leuven), Belgium

== See also ==
- Kula (disambiguation)
