= KAGG =

Country music radio station in Madisonville, Texas

- Madisonville, Texas; United States
- Broadcast area: Bryan–College Station, Texas
- Frequency: 96.1 MHz
- Branding: Aggie 96

Programming
- Format: Country music
- Affiliations: Premiere Networks

Ownership
- Owner: iHeartMedia, Inc.; (iHM Licenses, LLC)
- Sister stations: KNFX-FM, KKYS, KVJM

History
- First air date: August 29, 1989
- Former call signs: KIXF (1989)
- Call sign meaning: Aggie, as in the Texas A&M Aggies

Technical information
- Licensing authority: FCC
- Facility ID: 49944
- Class: C2
- ERP: 40,000 watts
- HAAT: 164 m (538 ft)
- Transmitter coordinates: 30°39′9.00″N 96°20′16.00″W

Links
- Public license information: Public file; LMS
- Webcast: Listen Live
- Website: aggie96.iheart.com

KAGG (96.1 FM; Aggie 96) is a radio station broadcasting a country music format, licensed to Madisonville, Texas, United States, and serving Bryan and College Station. The station is owned by iHeartMedia, Inc. The station's studios are located at Galleria Village on Briarcrest Drive in Bryan, with its transmitter atop the building.

== History ==
The station went on the air (in testing mode) as KIXF on August 19, 1989. On October 23, 1989, the station changed its call sign to the current KAGG. "Aggie 96" began 24/7 operations at Noon, on December 5, 1989.
