= KD =

KD and variants may refer to:

== Arts and entertainment ==
- K.D., a 2019 Indian Tamil-language film
- KD: The Devil, a 2026 Indian Kannada-language film by Prem
- Katamari Damacy, a video game for PlayStation 2
- Kill–death ratio, a statistic in player-versus-player combat video games
- Kings Dominion, an amusement park in Doswell, Virginia

== Businesses and organizations ==
=== Airlines ===
- KD Avia, a former Russian airline (IATA code KD)
- Kalstar Aviation (IATA code KD)
- Kendell Airlines, a former Australian airline (IATA code KD)

=== Other transport operators ===
- KD Transportation Group, a South Korean bus company
- Keolis Downer, an Australian public transport operator
- Lower Silesian Railways, a Polish rail operator
- Köln-Düsseldorfer, a river cruise operator based in Cologne, Germany

=== Other businesses and organizations ===
- Christian Democrats (Sweden), a Swedish political party
- Christian Democrats (Finland), a Finnish political party
- Kappa Delta, a National Panhellenic sorority
- Kyndryl Holdings, an IT services company based in New York City (stock ticker symbol KD)

== People ==
- k.d. lang, a Canadian pop singer-songwriter
- Kevin Durant, a professional basketball player
- Kuldeep Yadav, Indian cricketer
- Krisdayanti, an Indonesian singer and actress
- K?d, an American DJ and record producer

== Products ==
- Kentucky Deluxe, a brand of American whiskey
- Kraft Dinner, a convenience food product
- Toyota KD Engine, an engine manufactured by Toyota

== Science and technology ==
=== Medicine ===
- Kawasaki disease, an inflammatory disease causing vasculitis and sometimes aneurysm
- Kienböck's disease, an avascular necrosis in the lunate bone of the wrist
- Gene knockdown, a genetic modification technique

=== Other uses in science and technology ===
- K-d tree, a data structure in computing
- Dissociation constant (K_{D}), a type of equilibrium constant
- Toyota KD Engine, an engine manufactured by Toyota
- Knock-down kit, a kit of parts to assemble something

== Other uses ==
- Kapal DiRaja, a ship prefix used in the Royal Malaysian Navy
- Khaki drill, a fabric used in 20th-century British military uniforms
- Knock-down kit, a kit of parts to assemble something
- Kuwaiti dinar, a currency, sometimes represented "K.D." (ISO code KWD)
- KD Station, a meat packing plant, later business and entertainment complex, in Sioux City, Iowa, US
- Wasp dope, a drug sometimes known by the street name KD

== See also ==
- K-Dee, American rapper
- Kadee, model railroad company
- Kaydee, pop band
- Kaydee (disambiguation)
