= KY =

KY may refer to:

== Arts and entertainment ==
- Ky Kiske, a character in the Guilty Gear video games
- Kashiyatra, a festival in India

== People ==
- Nguyễn Cao Kỳ (1930–2011), South Vietnamese general and prime minister
- Ky Baldwin (born 2001), Australian singer, dancer and actor
- Ky Bowman (born 1997), American basketball player
- Ky Bush (born 1999), American Major League Basketball player
- Ky Ebright (1894–1979), American rowing coach
- Ky Fan (1914–2010), Chinese-born American mathematician
- Ky Furneaux (born 1973), Australian television host and survival expert
- Ky Hollenbeck (born 1987), American kickboxer
- Ky Hurst (born 1981), Australian swimmer and ironman
- Ky Laffoon (1908–1984), American golfer
- Ky Nam Le Duc, Vietnamese-Canadian film director
- Ky Rodwell (born 1999), Australian rugby player

== Places ==
- KY postcode area, Scotland
- Cayman Islands
  - .ky, top-level Internet domain
- Kentucky, a U.S. state
- County Kerry, Ireland (on vehicle licence plates)
- Kolej Yayasan UEM, a school in Malaysia
- Kyritz, Germany (on vehicle licence plates)

== Science and technology ==
- K-Y Jelly, a brand of personal lubricant
- KY Cygni, a red supergiant star

== Other uses ==
- Karnali Yaks, a Nepalese Twenty20 cricket franchise
- Kvalificerad Yrkesutbildning, Swedish Qualified Vocational Education
- Kyrgyz language (ISO 639 alpha-2 code KY)
- Air São Tomé and Príncipe and Kunming Air (IATA airline designator)

== See also ==
- ΚΨ or Kappa Psi, a pharmacy fraternity
