= KTS =

KTS/Kts may refer to:

- Keirsey Temperament Sorter, a self-assessed personality questionnaire
- Key telephone system
- Klippel–Trénaunay syndrome in medicine
- Knight of the Military Order of the Tower and Sword of Portugal
- The Knights Templar School, a secondary school in Baldock, Hertfordshire, England
- Knot (unit), a unit of speed equal to one nautical mile per hour
- Kotlin (programming language), uses the .kts file extension for Kotlin script files
- Brevig Mission Airport (IATA: KTS)
- Københavns Tekniske Skole, a school of secondary education in Copenhagen, Denmark
- Kagoshima Television Station, a television station in Kagoshima Prefecture, Japan
