= Kibi =

Kibi may refer to:

- kibi (binary prefix), an ISO/IEC standard binary prefix for units of digital information
- Kibi District, Okayama (吉備郡; -gun), a district in Okayama Prefecture, Japan
- Kibi, Wakayama (吉備町), a town in Arida District, Wakayama, Japan
- Kibi Province (吉備国), Japan, in the area of Okayama Prefecture and eastern Hiroshima Prefectures
- Kingdom of Kibi (吉備), a kingdom of 4th century western Japan
- Mount Kibi no Nakayama (吉備の中山), a hill in Okayama, Japan
- Kibi International University, a university in Okayama Prefecture, Japan
- Kibi, Ghana
- Kibi, a tiny fish that makes part of the regional cuisine in Kagoshima, Japan
- Kibi Makibi (AKA Kibi Daijin), 8th-century Japanese scholar
- Karmapa International Buddhist Institute (KIBI)
