= Kavminvodyavia =

Russian airline

Federal State Unitary Air Enterprise "Kavminvodyavia" ФГУАП «КМВ»
IATA	ICAO	Call sign
KV	MVD	AIR MINVODY
- Founded: 1995
- Ceased operations: 1 October 2011
- Hubs: Mineralnye Vody Airport, Vnukovo International Airport, Stavropol Shpakovskoye Airport
- Fleet size: 6
- Destinations: 18
- Parent company: Government owned
- Headquarters: Mineralnye Vody, Russia
- Key people: Vasiliy Viktorovich Babaskin (General Director)
- Website: kmvavia.aero

Kavminvodyavia (KMV Avia) was an airline based in Mineralnye Vody in the North Caucasus, Russia. It operated scheduled services to over 20 destinations in the northern Caucasus region and abroad, as well as charter services. Its main base was Mineralnye Vody Airport, which was also operated by the company.

== History ==
The first airport operation was in 1925, when a French Dornue-Comet was the sole aircraft. The present three-story airport building opened in 1965.

The airline was established in 1961 as the Mineralnye Vody Aviation Group. Its first international destination was Berlin in 1980. The airport and its civil aviation service was reorganized into the Mineralnye Vody Civil Aviation Enterprise in 1988, under the direction of V.V. Babaskin. It was reorganized again in 1995 into the State United Venture Kavminvodyavia, more commonly known as KMV. The airline purchased several Tupolev Tu-204 aircraft in 1997.

Following the 2010 decision of the Russian government to transfer the assets to Aeroflot, the airline ceased operations on 1 October 2011.

== Destinations ==
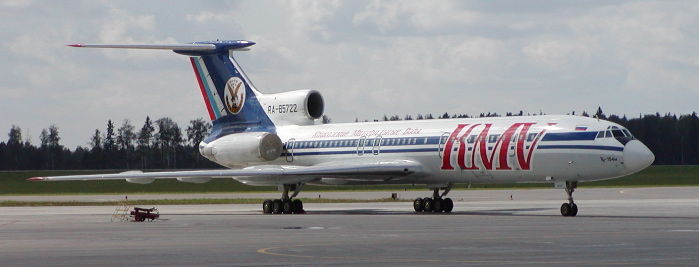
KMV Tu-154M at Moscow airport

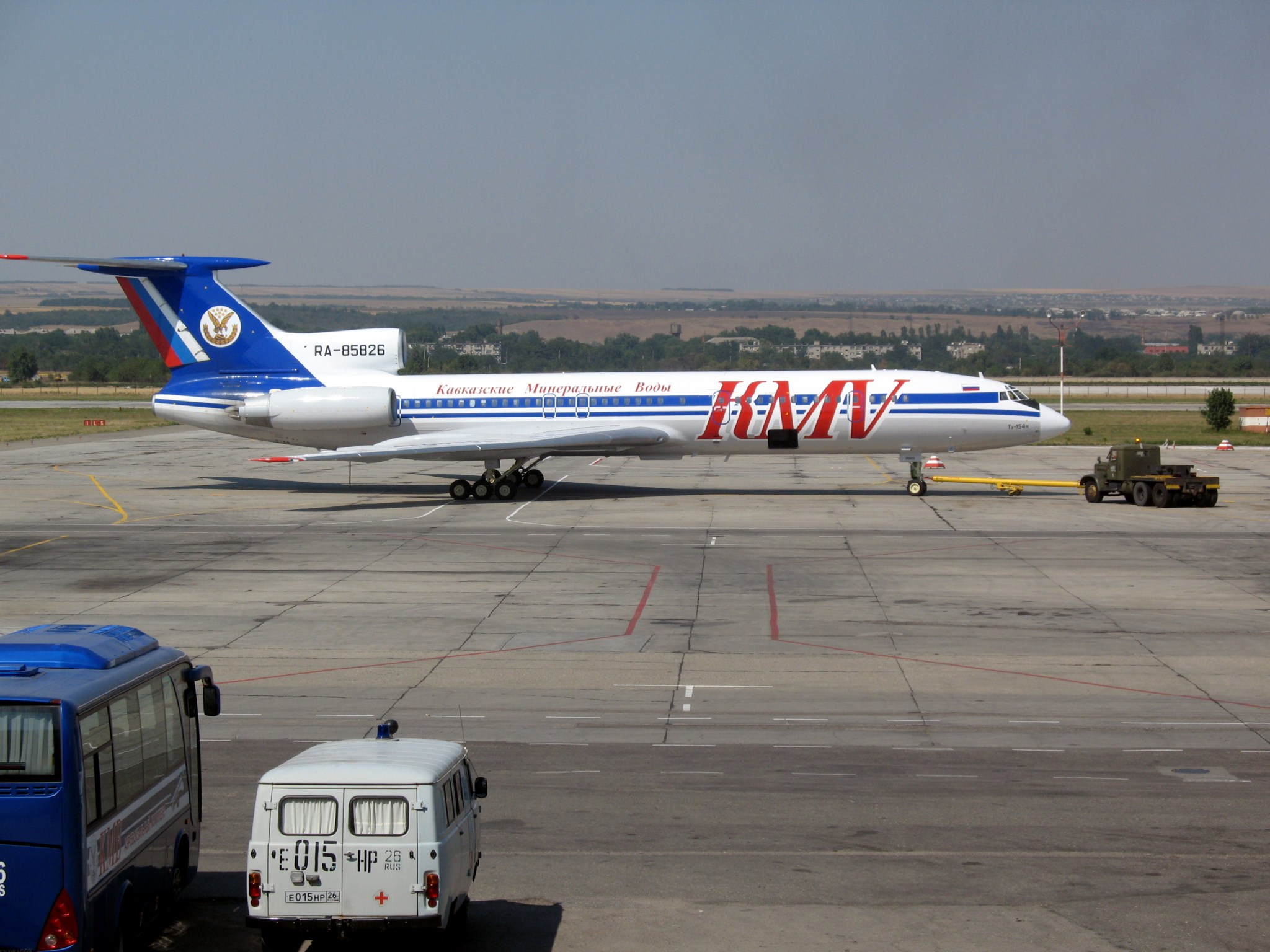
KMV Tupolev Tu-154 at Mineralnye Vody Airport

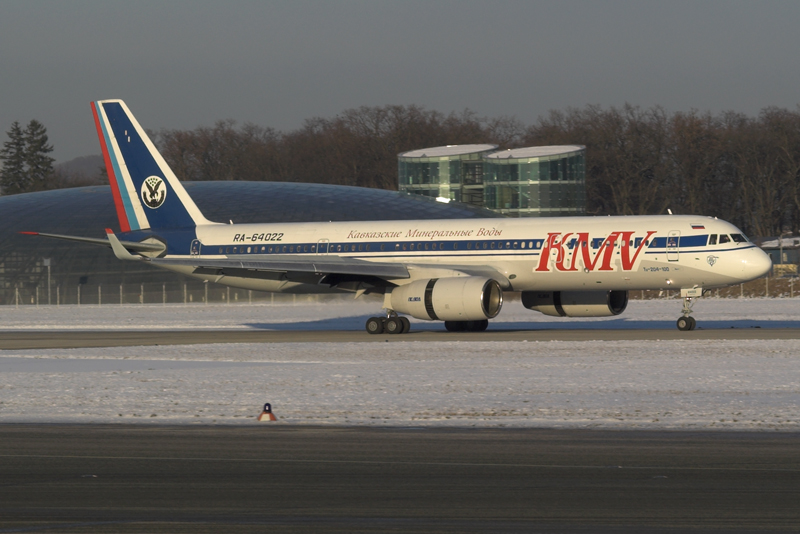
KMV Tupolev Tu-204 at Salzburg Airport

In August 2010, Kavminvodyavia operated flights to the following:
All flights to the European Union were suspended on 19 June 2007 due to fleet issues.

=== Scheduled ===
Armenia

- Yerevan – Zvartnots International Airport

Russia

- Irkutsk – Irkutsk International Airport
- Khabarovsk – Khabarovsk Novy Airport
- Moscow
  - Domodedovo Airport
  - Sheremetyevo Airport
  - Vnukovo Airport (focus city)
- Mineralnye Vody – Mineralnye Vody Airport (hub)
- Nizhnevartovsk – Nizhnevartovsk Airport
- Novokuznetsk – Spichenkovo Airport
- Novosibirsk – Tolmachevo Airport
- Noyabrsk – Noyabrsk Airport
- Pevek – Pevek Airport
- Saint Petersburg – Pulkovo Airport
- Stavropol – Stavropol Shpakovskoye Airport
- Yekaterinburg – Koltsovo Airport

Ukraine

- Simferopol – Simferopol International Airport

=== Charter ===
Bulgaria

- Burgas – Burgas Airport

Cyprus

- Paphos – Paphos International Airport

Greece

- Thessaloniki – Thessaloniki International Airport

Israel

- Tel Aviv – Ben Gurion International Airport

Italy

- Turin – Sandro Pertini International Airport (Caselle)

== Fleet ==
In April 2011 the Kavminvodyavia fleet included:

Aircraft type	Active	Orders	Seats			Age, years	Notes
Aircraft type	Active	Orders	Business	Economy	Total	Age, years	Notes
Tupolev Tu-154M	8	1	30^{1}	102	132	19,8	Two more stored
Tupolev Tu-154M	8	1	0	165	165	19,8	Two more stored
Tupolev Tu-204-100	2	2	0	192	192	13,1	

^{1}12 first class (3 rows, 4 abreast) and 18 (3 rows, 6 abreast) seats.
