= Kes =

Kes or KES may refer to:

== Arts and entertainment ==
- Kes (band), a musical ensemble from Trinidad
- Kes (film), 1969 film directed by Ken Loach
- Kes (Star Trek), a fictional character in Star Trek: Voyager

== Education ==
- Kellom Elementary School, an elementary school in the United States
- KES College, a college in Cyprus
- King Edward's School (disambiguation), several uses

== Other uses ==
- Keş, a village in Azerbaijan
- Kes (Judaism), a rabbi in the Beta Israel community
- Willem Kes (1856–1934), Dutch conductor and violinist
- Kawabata evaluation system, a measure of the mechanical properties of fabrics
- Kelsey Airport, Canada, IATA airport code KES
- Kenyan shilling, the currency of Kenya, ISO code KES
- Killer Elite Squad, a professional wrestling tag team
- Kristiania Elektriske Sporvei, a defunct tram company in Oslo, Norway
- Kesh (Sikhism), or kas, the uncut hair worn by members of the Sikh faith

== See also ==
- Kesh (disambiguation)
