= Kish =

Kish may refer to:

== Businesses and organisations ==
- Kish, a military formation of Ukrainian Cossacks (see Kish otaman)
- KISH, a radio station in Guam
- Kish Air, an Iranian airline
- Korean International School in Hanoi, Vietnam
- Episcopal Conference of Albania, assembly of Catholic bishops

== People ==
- Kish (surname), including a list of people with the name
- Kish, a former stage name of Andrew Kishino (born 1970), Canadian actor and rapper
- Kish (Bible), father of Saul
- Kish, a Jaredite king in the Book of Mormon

== Places ==
- Gishi, Nagorno-Karabakh, Azerbaijan, also called Kish
- Kiş, Shaki, Azerbaijan
  - Church of Kish
- Kish Island, Iran
  - Kish, Iran, a city
  - Kish Gas Field
  - Kish International Airport
  - Kish District, an administrative subdivision
  - Kish Rural District, an administrative subdivision
- Kish (Sumer), an ancient city now in Iraq
  - Kish civilization, an ancient Mesopotamian culture
- Kish Bank, off the coast of Dublin, Ireland
- Kishacoquillas Valley, or Kish Valley, Pennsylvania, U.S.
- Kish, historic name of Shahrisabz, Uzbekistan

== Other uses ==
- Iranian yacht Kish, a former royal yacht of the Shah of Iran
- Kish (Tokyo Mew Mew), a fictional character
- Oliver Fish and Kyle Lewis, fictional characters from the American soap opera One Life to Live
- Kish, a byproduct in steelmaking, used in Graphite recycling

== See also ==
- Kesh (disambiguation)
- Kishi (disambiguation)
- Kitsch
- Kish grid, a sampling methodology
- Kish Khodro, Iranian auto manufacturer
