= Red states and blue states =

United States voting pattern

Summary of statewide results of the 2012, 2016, 2020, and 2024 presidential elections by state: Won by the Republicans in all four elections Won by the Republicans in three of the four elections Won by each party twice in the four elections Won by the Democrats in three of the four elections Won by the Democrats in all four elections

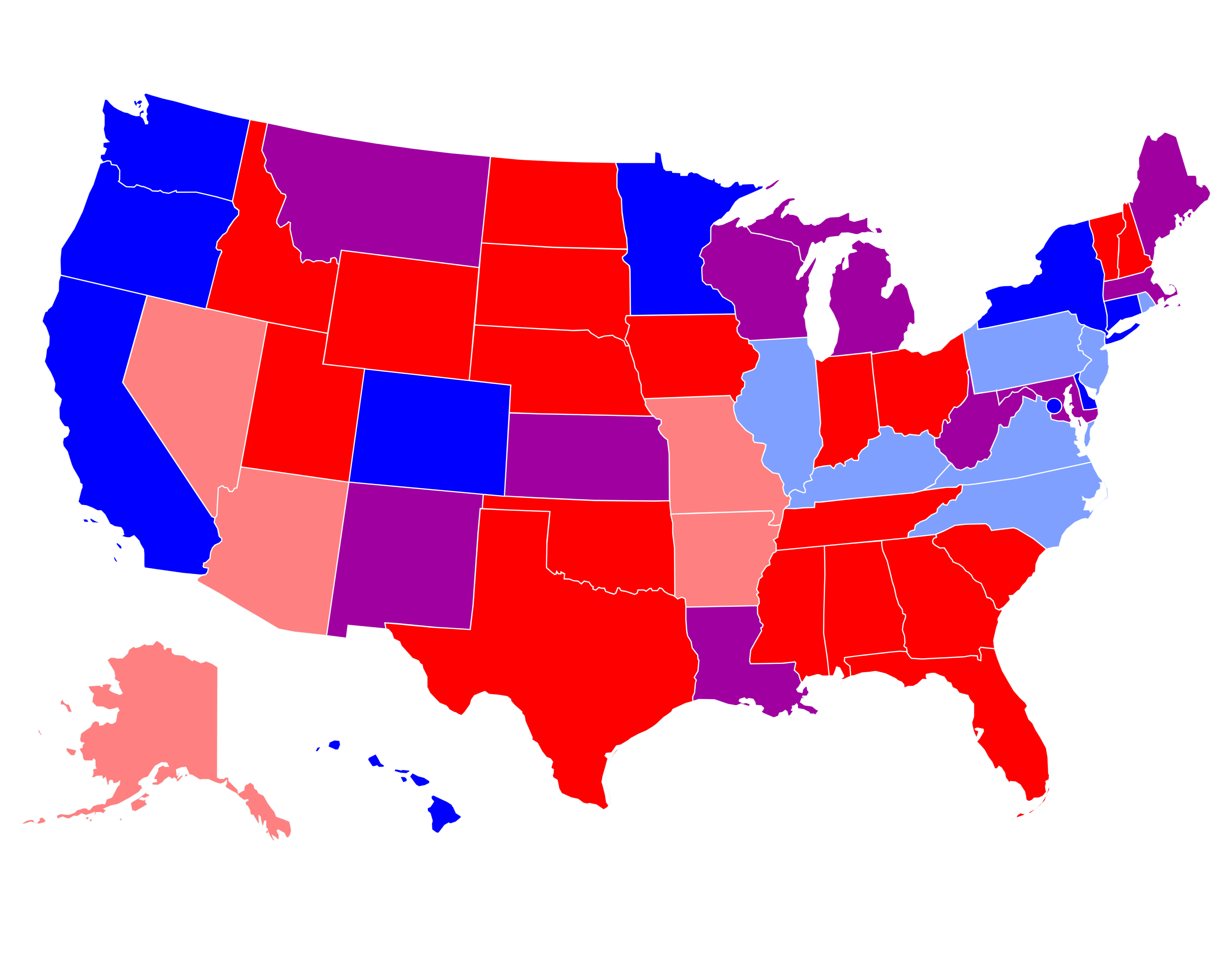
Summary of last four gubernatorial election results in each state as of January 2026: Won by the Republicans in all four elections Won by the Republicans in three of the four elections Won by each party twice in the four elections Won by the Democrats in three of the four elections Won by the Democrats in all four elections

Party affiliation of current United States state and territorial governors as of January 2026: Democratic (24 states, 2 territories, and 1 district) Republican (26 states) Independent (1 territory) New Progressive (Republican affiliated) (1 territory) Non-partisan (Republican affiliated) (1 territory)

Starting with the 2000 United States presidential election, the term red state has been used to refer to states which predominantly vote for the Republican Party, and the term blue state has been used to refer to states which predominantly vote for the Democratic Party. By contrast, states where the predominant vote fluctuates between Democratic and Republican nominees are known as swing states or purple states. Examining patterns within states reveals that the reversal of the two parties' geographic bases has happened at the state level, but it is more complicated locally, with urban–rural divides associated with many of the largest changes.

Incumbent senators. Red and blue denote two Republican or two Democratic senators respectively. Purple states denote one Republican and one Democrat from the state. Light blue stripes denote one independent senator (who caucuses with the Democrats).

All states contain both Democratic voters and Republican voters (i.e., they are "purple") and only appear blue or red on the electoral map because of the winner-take-all system used by most states in the Electoral College. However, the perception of some states as "blue" and others as "red", based on plurality or majority support for either party, was reinforced by a degree of partisan stability from election to election—from the 2016 presidential election to the 2020 presidential election, only five states changed "color"; as of 2024, 35 out of 50 states have voted for the same party in every presidential election since the red-blue terminology was popularized in 2000, with only 15 having swung between the 2000 presidential election and 2024 election. Although many red states and blue states stay in the same category for long periods, they may also switch from either blue to red or red to blue over time.

== History of the color schematics ==
=== Origins ===
The colors red and blue are also featured on the United States flag. Traditional political mapmakers, at least throughout the 20th century, had used blue to represent the modern-day Republicans, as well as the earlier Federalist Party. This may have been a holdover from the Civil War, during which the predominantly Republican north was considered "blue". However, at that time, a maker of widely sold maps accompanied them with blue pencils to mark Confederate force movements, while red was for the Union.

Later, in the 1888 presidential election, Grover Cleveland and Benjamin Harrison used maps that coded blue for the Republicans, the color perceived to represent the Union and "Lincoln's Party", and red for the Democrats. The parties themselves had no official colors, with candidates variously using either or both of the national color palette of red and blue (white being unsuitable for printed materials).

There was one historical use, associated with boss rule, of blue for Democrats and red for Republicans: during the late 19th century and early 20th century, Texas county election boards used color-coding to help Spanish-speaking and illiterate voters identify the parties; however, this system was not applied consistently in Texas and was not replicated in any other state. In 1908, The New York Times printed a special color map, using blue for Democrats and yellow for Republicans, to detail Theodore Roosevelt's 1904 electoral victory. That same year, a color supplement included with a July issue of The Washington Post used red for Republican-favoring states, blue for Democratic-favoring states, yellow for "doubtful" states and green for territories that did not have a presidential vote.

=== Contrast with color usage in other countries ===
Incumbent House of Representative members by state. The darker the shade, the higher percentage of members of that party. Dark blue and red are 100% members of the party. Purple states are evenly split.

The 21st-century association of colors in American politics is contrary to the long-standing conventions of political color in most other countries whereby red symbols (such as the red flag or red star) are associated with leftist politics including countries with such governments, such as Red China, whereas blue is associated with conservatism. As late as the 1990s, Democrats were often represented by red and Republicans by blue. According to The Washington Post, journalist Tim Russert invented these terms during his televised coverage of the 2000 United States presidential election. The 2000 election was not the first during which the news media used colored maps to depict voter preferences in the various states, but it was the first time the current red–blue terminology was used. In previous elections, the color assignments or even the actual colors used were often different.

=== History of current designations ===
The advent of color television in America during the late 1950s and early 1960s prompted television news reporters to rely on color-coded electoral maps, though sources conflict as to the conventions they used. One source claims that in the elections prior to 2000 every state that voted for Democratic candidates but one had been coded red. It further claims that from 1976 to 2004, in an attempt to avoid favoritism in color-coding, the broadcast networks standardized the convention of alternating every four years between blue and red the color used for the incumbent president's party.

According to another source, in 1976, John Chancellor, the anchorman for NBC Nightly News, asked his network's engineers to construct a large illuminated map of the United States. The map was placed in the network's election-night news studio. If Jimmy Carter, the Democratic candidate that year, won a state, it was lit in red whereas if Gerald Ford, the incumbent Republican president, won a state, it was lit in blue. It was said that Roy Wetzel, then the newly appointed general manager of NBC's election unit, justified the color scheme of blue for Republicans and red for Democrats for a simple reason: "Great Britain. Without giving it a second thought, we said blue for conservatives, because that's what the parliamentary system in London is, red for the more liberal party. And that settled it. We just did it. Forget all that communist red stuff. It didn't occur to us. When I first heard it, I thought, 'Oh, that's really silly.'" The feature proved to be so popular that, four years later, all three major television networks used colors to designate the states won by the presidential candidates, though not all using the same color scheme. NBC continued its color scheme (blue for Republicans) until 1996. NBC newsman David Brinkley referred to the 1980 election map outcome showing Republican Ronald Reagan's 44-state landslide in blue as resembling a "suburban swimming pool".

Since the 1984 election, CBS has used the opposite scheme: blue for Democrats, red for Republicans. ABC used yellow for Republicans and blue for Democrats in 1976, then red for Republicans and blue for Democrats in 1980, 1984, and 1988. In 1980, when John Anderson had a relatively well publicized campaign as an independent candidate, at least one network indicated provisionally that they would use yellow if he were to win a state. Similarly, at least one network would have used yellow to indicate a state won by Ross Perot in 1992 and 1996, though neither of them did claim any states in any of these years.

By 1996, color schemes were relatively mixed, as CNN, CBS, ABC, NBC, and The New York Times referred to Democratic states with the color blue and Republican ones as red, while Time and The Washington Post used the opposite scheme.

In the days after the 2000 election, the outcome of which was unknown for some time after election day, major media outlets began conforming to the same color scheme because the electoral map was continually in view, and conformity made for easy and instant viewer comprehension. On election night that year, there was no coordinated effort to code Democratic states blue and Republican states red; the association gradually emerged. Partly as a result of this eventual and near-universal color-coding, the terms "red states" and "blue states" entered popular use in the weeks after the 2000 presidential election. After the results were final with the Republican George W. Bush winning, journalists stuck with the color scheme, as The Atlantic's December 2001 cover story by David Brooks entitled, "One Nation, Slightly Divisible", illustrated.

Thus, red and blue became fixed in the media and in many people's minds, despite the fact that the Democratic and Republican parties had not officially chosen colors. Some Republicans argue the GOP should retain its historic association with blue, since most center-right parties worldwide are associated with blue. On March 14, 2014, the California Republican Party officially rejected red and adopted blue as its color. Archie Tse, The New York Times graphics editor who made the choice when the Times published its first color presidential election map in 2000, provided a nonpolitical rationale for retaining the red–Republican link, explaining that "Both 'Republican' and 'red' start with the letter 'R.'"

== Map interpretation ==
There are several problems in creating and interpreting election maps. Popular vote data are necessarily aggregated at several levels, such as counties and states, which are then colored to show election results. Maps of this type are termed choropleth maps, which have several well-known problems that can result in interpretation bias. One problem occurs when areal units differ in size and significance, as is the case with election maps. These maps give extra visual weight to larger areal units, whether by county or state. This problem is compounded if the units are not equally significant. A large county or state in area may have fewer voters than a small one in area, for example. Some maps attempt to account for this by using cartogram methods, but the resulting distortion can make such maps difficult to read. Another problem relates to data classification. Election maps often use a two-class color scheme (red and blue), which results in a map that is easy to read but is very generalized. Some maps use more classes, such as shades of red and blue to indicate the degree of election victory. These maps provide a more detailed picture but themselves have various problems associated with classification of data. The cartographer must choose how many classes to use and how to divide the data into those classes. While there are various techniques available, the choice is essentially arbitrary. The look of a map can vary significantly depending on the classification choices. The choices of color and shading likewise affect the map's appearance. Further, all election maps are subject to the interpretation error known as the ecological fallacy.

Finally, there are problems associated with human perception. Large areas of color appear more saturated than small areas of the same color. A juxtaposition of differing colors and shades can result in contrast misperceptions. For example, due to the simultaneous contrast effect, the Bezold effect, and other factors, an area shaded light red surrounded by areas shaded dark red will appear even lighter. Differing shades of red and blue compound this effect.

Cartographers have traditionally limited the number of classes so that it is always obvious which class a color shade represents. Some election maps, however, have violated this tradition by simply coloring each areal unit with a red-blue mixture linked to voting ratio data—resulting in an "unclassified choropleth map". These "purple maps" are useful for showing the highly mixed nature of voting, but are extremely difficult to interpret in detail. The lack of clear classes make these purple maps prone to the problems of color perception described above. However, there are pros and cons to both classified and unclassified choropleth maps. Each tend to show some patterns well while obscuring others. All these facts should be taken into account when looking at election maps.

In 2023, Humanities Magazine published an article, "Red Map, Blue Map" discussing the work of political geographer, Kenneth C. Martis about his work to map every congressional district and color-code them by political party from the first Congress onward. The Historical Atlas of Political Parties in the United States Congress: 1789-1989, published in 1989, was the first to map all U.S. congressional elections for every state and district by the political party affiliation of each person elected to Congress. The atlas used the traditional political mapmaker cartographic practices, red for Democrats and Blue for Republicans.

=== Critiques ===
The paradigm has been criticized on several fronts. Many argue that assigning partisanship to states is only really useful as it pertains to the Electoral College, as well as (more recently) the Senate, primarily a winner-take-all system of elections (with the exceptions of Nebraska and Maine).

The Democratic or Republican party of a particular state may have policies that depart—sometimes greatly—from those of the national party, sometimes causing that state to favor one party in state and local elections and the other in presidential elections. This is most evident in the Southern United States, where the state Democratic Party organizations tend to be more conservative than the national party, especially on social issues. Likewise, Republicans have elected many statewide officeholders in states that vote strongly Democratic in presidential elections, such as Massachusetts, Illinois, Maryland, Vermont, and New Jersey, generally by running closer to the political center.

The elections in Arkansas as well as West Virginia in 2004 were won by Republican President George W. Bush, but Democrats at the time held all four U.S. Senate seats and majorities of elected executive officeholders in those states, including the governorship of the latter. Similarly, Tennessee was won by Bush in both 2000 and 2004, but going into 2004, its governor was a Democrat and both chambers of the state legislature were controlled by Democrats as well. The converse can also be true, as in the case of Maine, which had two Republican U.S. senators, but Democratic presidential candidate John Kerry won the state's electoral votes. Likewise, Vermont, New York, Massachusetts, Maryland, and Hawaii all voted for Democrat Kerry by wide margins, but all had Republican governors at the time.

In his address before the 2004 Democratic National Convention in Boston, Barack Obama spoke on the issue of blue states and red states, saying: "The pundits like to slice-and-dice our country into red states and blue states—red states for Republicans, and blue states for Democrats. But I've got news for them, too. We worship an awesome God in the blue states, and we don't like federal agents poking around our libraries in the red states. We coach Little League in the blue states and have gay friends in the red states. ... We are one people, all of us pledging allegiance to the Stars and Stripes, all of us defending the United States of America."

In April 2008, Republican presidential nominee John McCain predicted that the presidential election that November would not follow the red-state-blue-state pattern, saying, "I'm not sure that the old red state, blue state scenario that prevailed for the last several elections works. I think most of these states that we have either red or blue are going to be up for grabs." Arguably, this eventually proved to be somewhat true, but not in McCain's favor as Obama won three "red" states that had not voted Democratic in many years, namely Virginia, North Carolina, and Indiana along with a part of deep red Nebraska, via the state's (much less conservative as a whole) second congressional district. Obama also came close to winning Missouri and Montana, losing both by a small margin. The only deviations from the preexisting red-blue paradigm were all in Obama's favor.

== Purple states ==
2024 United States presidential election results by county, on a color spectrum from Democratic blue to Republican red

A purple state refers to a swing state where both Democratic and Republican candidates receive many votes without an overwhelming majority for either party. Purple states are also often referred to as "battleground" states.

The demographic and political applications of the terms have resulted in a temptation to presume this arbitrary classification is a definite and fundamental cultural division. Given the general nature and common perception of the two parties, "red state" implies a conservative region or a more conservative American, and "blue state" implies a more liberal region or a more liberal American. But the distinction between the two groups of states is less simplistic. The analysis that suggests political, cultural and demographic differences between the states is more accurate when applied to smaller geographical areas.

Traditionally, the practice of designating a U.S. state as red or blue is based on the first-past-the-post, winner-take-all system used for presidential elections by 48 of the 50 U.S. states and the District of Columbia. Electoral law in Maine and Nebraska makes it possible for those states to divide their electoral votes: winner-take-all both by congressional district and statewide.

Despite the widespread winner-take-all practice, the minority party almost always receives a sizable share of the vote. In the most strongly partisan states, 25% to 40% of voters typically back the losing party in a presidential election. Most states have strongly Democratic cities as well as strongly Republican rural areas.

Robert Vanderbei at Princeton University made the first Purple America map after the 2000 presidential election. It attempts to represent the margin of victory in each county by coloring each with a shade between true blue and true red. Due to the general absence of overwhelming victories, this technique results in mostly shades of purple. After the 2004 election, Vanderbei and then others made similar maps summarizing the results. Quickly thereafter, the term Purple America entered the public lexicon as a way of stating that the United States is not as divided as the political pundits would have the people believe.

Cartograms developed by Gastner, Shalizi, and Newman at the University of Michigan provide another way to depict election results, which change from a red-blue paradigm to one of shades of purple.

Forty-four of the 50 states were consistent in voting for Donald Trump or his Democratic opponent in the 2016, 2020, and 2024 presidential elections. The exceptions were Georgia, Arizona, Wisconsin, Pennsylvania, Michigan – all of which voted for Trump in 2016, Biden in 2020, and Trump again in 2024; and Nevada – the only state that voted for the Democrats in 2016 and 2020 but voted for Trump in 2024. Wisconsin, Pennsylvania and particularly Michigan voted in 2008 and 2012 for Obama handily, as well as having supported the Democratic nominee in every presidential election since 1988, suggesting they are gradually becoming redder. Inversely, Georgia and Arizona had supported Republican presidential candidates for decades before 2020, with Georgia last voting blue in 1992 and Arizona in 1996. This suggests that Georgia and Arizona are gradually becoming bluer.

Some states did not switch parties in 2016, 2020 or 2024, yet are/were still relatively even and often considered swing states. These include North Carolina and New Hampshire. Occasionally, swing state maps might include Minnesota, Maine, Virginia, Florida, Ohio, and Iowa which generally vote for one party (Minnesota, Maine and Virginia generally Democratic; Florida, Ohio and Iowa generally Republican) but still often see close elections.

== Polarization ==
Summary of statewide results of the 2012, 2016, 2020, and 2024 presidential elections by state: Won by the Republicans in all four elections Won by the Republicans in three of the four elections Won by each party twice in the four elections Won by the Democrats in three of the four elections Won by the Democrats in all four elections

Feelings of cultural and political polarization between red and blue states, which have gained increased media attention since the 2004 election, have resulted in increased mutual feelings of alienation and enmity. The polarization has been present for only four close elections (2000, 2004, 2016, and 2020). One trend that has been true for several election cycles is that states that vote Republican tend to be more rural and more sparsely populated (thus having fewer electoral votes) than states that vote Democratic. Polarization is more evident on a county scale with the growing percentage of the U.S. electorate living in "landslide counties", counties where the popular vote margin between the Democratic and Republican candidate is 20 percentage points or greater.

In 1976, only 27 percent of U.S. voters lived in landslide counties, which increased to 39 percent by 1992. Nearly half of U.S. voters resided in counties that voted for George W. Bush or John Kerry by 20 percentage points or more in 2004. In 2008, 48 percent of U.S. voters lived in such counties, which increased further to 50 percent in 2012 and to 61 percent in 2016. In 2020, 58 percent of U.S. voters lived in landslide counties. At the same time, the 2020 U.S. presidential election marked the ninth presidential election where the victorious major party nominee did not win a popular vote majority by a double-digit margin over the losing major party nominee(s), continuing the longest sequence of such presidential elections in U.S. history that began in 1988 and in 2016 eclipsed the previous longest sequence from 1876 through 1900.

=== Red-state/blue-state secession ===
Various editorials have proposed that states of the U.S. secede and then form federations only with states that have voted for the same political party. These editorials note the increasingly polarized political strife in the U.S. between Republican voters and Democratic voters. They propose partition of the U.S. as a way of allowing both groups to achieve their policy goals while reducing the chances of civil war.

A 2021 poll found that 52% of Trump voters and 41% of Biden voters support partitioning the United States into multiple countries based on political party lines. A different poll that same year grouped the United States into five geographic regions, and found that 37% of Americans favored secession of their own region. 44% of Americans in the South favored secession, with Republican support at 66%; while Democratic support was 47% in the Pacific states.

== Demographics ==
Although the Electoral College determines the presidential election, a more precise measure of how the country actually voted may be better represented by either a county-by-county or a district-by-district map. By breaking the map down into smaller units (including many blue counties lying next to red counties), these maps tend to display many states with a purplish hue, thus demonstrating that an ostensibly blue or red state may, in fact, be closely divided. Note that election maps of all kinds are subject to errors of interpretation.

=== Urban versus rural ===
These county-by-county and district-by-district maps reveal that the true nature of the divide is between urban areas and inner suburbs versus rural and exurban areas. In the 2020 election, most voters in most rural counties voted for Republican Donald Trump. Georgia, Nevada, Pennsylvania, and Wisconsin, all states Biden won statewide, are good examples of this with some exceptions. Inversely, in solidly red states, most voters in most urban counties voted for Democrat Joe Biden; good examples for this would be Orleans Parish, Louisiana, and Davidson County, Tennessee (the locations of major U.S. cities New Orleans and Nashville, respectively). Both provided Biden with double-digit margins of victory over Trump. An even more detailed precinct-by-precinct breakdown demonstrates that in many cases, large cities voted for Biden, and their suburbs were divided.

=== Table of presidential elections by states since 1972 ===
Key:

- Democratic
  (lighter shading indicates win ≤5%)
- Republican
  (lighter shading indicates win ≤5%)
- Winner received plurality of the vote but did not receive an outright majority of the popular vote
- Winner did not receive a plurality of the vote and lost the popular vote

Year	1972	1976	1980	1984	1988	1992	1996	2000	2004	2008	2012	2016	2020	2024
Democratic candidate	George McGovern	Jimmy Carter	Jimmy Carter	Walter Mondale	Michael Dukakis	Bill Clinton	Bill Clinton	Al Gore	John Kerry	Barack Obama	Barack Obama	Hillary Clinton	Joe Biden	Kamala Harris
Republican candidate	Richard Nixon	Gerald Ford	Ronald Reagan	Ronald Reagan	George H. W. Bush	George H. W. Bush	Bob Dole	George W. Bush	George W. Bush	John McCain	Mitt Romney	Donald Trump	Donald Trump	Donald Trump
(United States) National popular vote	Nixon	Carter	Reagan	Reagan	Bush	Clinton	Clinton	Gore	Bush	Obama	Obama	Clinton	Biden	Trump
Alabama	Nixon	Carter	Reagan	Reagan	Bush	Bush	Dole	Bush	Bush	McCain	Romney	Trump	Trump	Trump
Alaska	Nixon	Ford	Reagan	Reagan	Bush	Bush	Dole	Bush	Bush	McCain	Romney	Trump	Trump	Trump
Arizona	Nixon	Ford	Reagan	Reagan	Bush	Bush	Clinton	Bush	Bush	McCain	Romney	Trump	Biden	Trump
Arkansas	Nixon	Carter	Reagan	Reagan	Bush	Clinton	Clinton	Bush	Bush	McCain	Romney	Trump	Trump	Trump
California	Nixon	Ford	Reagan	Reagan	Bush	Clinton	Clinton	Gore	Kerry	Obama	Obama	Clinton	Biden	Harris
Colorado	Nixon	Ford	Reagan	Reagan	Bush	Clinton	Dole	Bush	Bush	Obama	Obama	Clinton	Biden	Harris
Connecticut	Nixon	Ford	Reagan	Reagan	Bush	Clinton	Clinton	Gore	Kerry	Obama	Obama	Clinton	Biden	Harris
Delaware	Nixon	Carter	Reagan	Reagan	Bush	Clinton	Clinton	Gore	Kerry	Obama	Obama	Clinton	Biden	Harris
(Washington, D.C.) District of Columbia	McGovern	Carter	Carter	Mondale	Dukakis	Clinton	Clinton	Gore	Kerry	Obama	Obama	Clinton	Biden	Harris
Florida	Nixon	Carter	Reagan	Reagan	Bush	Bush	Clinton	Bush	Bush	Obama	Obama	Trump	Trump	Trump
(Georgia (U.S. state)) Georgia	Nixon	Carter	Carter	Reagan	Bush	Clinton	Dole	Bush	Bush	McCain	Romney	Trump	Biden	Trump
Hawaii	Nixon	Carter	Carter	Reagan	Dukakis	Clinton	Clinton	Gore	Kerry	Obama	Obama	Clinton	Biden	Harris
Idaho	Nixon	Ford	Reagan	Reagan	Bush	Bush	Dole	Bush	Bush	McCain	Romney	Trump	Trump	Trump
Illinois	Nixon	Ford	Reagan	Reagan	Bush	Clinton	Clinton	Gore	Kerry	Obama	Obama	Clinton	Biden	Harris
Indiana	Nixon	Ford	Reagan	Reagan	Bush	Bush	Dole	Bush	Bush	Obama	Romney	Trump	Trump	Trump
Iowa	Nixon	Ford	Reagan	Reagan	Dukakis	Clinton	Clinton	Gore	Bush	Obama	Obama	Trump	Trump	Trump
Kansas	Nixon	Ford	Reagan	Reagan	Bush	Bush	Dole	Bush	Bush	McCain	Romney	Trump	Trump	Trump
Kentucky	Nixon	Carter	Reagan	Reagan	Bush	Clinton	Clinton	Bush	Bush	McCain	Romney	Trump	Trump	Trump
Louisiana	Nixon	Carter	Reagan	Reagan	Bush	Clinton	Clinton	Bush	Bush	McCain	Romney	Trump	Trump	Trump
Maine	Nixon	Ford	Reagan	Reagan	Bush	Clinton (at-large and ME-01)	Clinton	Gore (at-large and ME-01)	Kerry	Obama	Obama	Clinton (at-large)	Biden (at-large and ME-01)	Harris (at-large and ME-01)
Maine	Nixon	Ford	Reagan	Reagan	Bush	Clinton (at-large and ME-01)	Clinton	Gore (at-large and ME-01)	Kerry	Obama	Obama	Clinton (ME-01)	Biden (at-large and ME-01)	Harris (at-large and ME-01)
Maine	Nixon	Ford	Reagan	Reagan	Bush	Clinton (ME-02)	Clinton	Gore (ME-02)	Kerry	Obama	Obama	Trump (ME-02)	Trump (ME-02)	Trump (ME-02)
Maryland	Nixon	Carter	Carter	Reagan	Bush	Clinton	Clinton	Gore	Kerry	Obama	Obama	Clinton	Biden	Harris
Massachusetts	McGovern	Carter	Reagan	Reagan	Dukakis	Clinton	Clinton	Gore	Kerry	Obama	Obama	Clinton	Biden	Harris
Michigan	Nixon	Ford	Reagan	Reagan	Bush	Clinton	Clinton	Gore	Kerry	Obama	Obama	Trump	Biden	Trump
Minnesota	Nixon	Carter	Carter	Mondale	Dukakis	Clinton	Clinton	Gore	Kerry	Obama	Obama	Clinton	Biden	Harris
Mississippi	Nixon	Carter	Reagan	Reagan	Bush	Bush	Dole	Bush	Bush	McCain	Romney	Trump	Trump	Trump
Missouri	Nixon	Carter	Reagan	Reagan	Bush	Clinton	Clinton	Bush	Bush	McCain	Romney	Trump	Trump	Trump
Montana	Nixon	Ford	Reagan	Reagan	Bush	Clinton	Dole	Bush	Bush	McCain	Romney	Trump	Trump	Trump
Nebraska	Nixon	Ford	Reagan	Reagan	Bush	Bush	Dole	Bush	Bush	McCain (at-large, NE-01, NE-03)	Romney	Trump (at-large, NE-01, NE-03)	Trump (at-large, NE-01, NE-03)	Trump (at-large, NE-01, NE-03)
Nebraska	Nixon	Ford	Reagan	Reagan	Bush	Bush	Dole	Bush	Bush	Obama (NE-02)	Romney	Trump (NE-02)	Biden (NE-02)	Harris (NE-02)
Nevada	Nixon	Ford	Reagan	Reagan	Bush	Clinton	Clinton	Bush	Bush	Obama	Obama	Clinton	Biden	Trump
New Hampshire	Nixon	Ford	Reagan	Reagan	Bush	Clinton	Clinton	Bush	Kerry	Obama	Obama	Clinton	Biden	Harris
New Jersey	Nixon	Ford	Reagan	Reagan	Bush	Clinton	Clinton	Gore	Kerry	Obama	Obama	Clinton	Biden	Harris
New Mexico	Nixon	Ford	Reagan	Reagan	Bush	Clinton	Clinton	Gore	Bush	Obama	Obama	Clinton	Biden	Harris
New York	Nixon	Carter	Reagan	Reagan	Dukakis	Clinton	Clinton	Gore	Kerry	Obama	Obama	Clinton	Biden	Harris
North Carolina	Nixon	Carter	Reagan	Reagan	Bush	Bush	Dole	Bush	Bush	Obama	Romney	Trump	Trump	Trump
North Dakota	Nixon	Ford	Reagan	Reagan	Bush	Bush	Dole	Bush	Bush	McCain	Romney	Trump	Trump	Trump
Ohio	Nixon	Carter	Reagan	Reagan	Bush	Clinton	Clinton	Bush	Bush	Obama	Obama	Trump	Trump	Trump
Oklahoma	Nixon	Ford	Reagan	Reagan	Bush	Bush	Dole	Bush	Bush	McCain	Romney	Trump	Trump	Trump
Oregon	Nixon	Ford	Reagan	Reagan	Dukakis	Clinton	Clinton	Gore	Kerry	Obama	Obama	Clinton	Biden	Harris
Pennsylvania	Nixon	Carter	Reagan	Reagan	Bush	Clinton	Clinton	Gore	Kerry	Obama	Obama	Trump	Biden	Trump
Rhode Island	Nixon	Carter	Carter	Reagan	Dukakis	Clinton	Clinton	Gore	Kerry	Obama	Obama	Clinton	Biden	Harris
South Carolina	Nixon	Carter	Reagan	Reagan	Bush	Bush	Dole	Bush	Bush	McCain	Romney	Trump	Trump	Trump
South Dakota	Nixon	Ford	Reagan	Reagan	Bush	Bush	Dole	Bush	Bush	McCain	Romney	Trump	Trump	Trump
Tennessee	Nixon	Carter	Reagan	Reagan	Bush	Clinton	Clinton	Bush	Bush	McCain	Romney	Trump	Trump	Trump
Texas	Nixon	Carter	Reagan	Reagan	Bush	Bush	Dole	Bush	Bush	McCain	Romney	Trump	Trump	Trump
Utah	Nixon	Ford	Reagan	Reagan	Bush	Bush	Dole	Bush	Bush	McCain	Romney	Trump	Trump	Trump
Vermont	Nixon	Ford	Reagan	Reagan	Bush	Clinton	Clinton	Gore	Kerry	Obama	Obama	Clinton	Biden	Harris
Virginia	Nixon	Ford	Reagan	Reagan	Bush	Bush	Dole	Bush	Bush	Obama	Obama	Clinton	Biden	Harris
(Washington (state)) Washington	Nixon	Ford	Reagan	Reagan	Dukakis	Clinton	Clinton	Gore	Kerry	Obama	Obama	Clinton	Biden	Harris
West Virginia	Nixon	Carter	Carter	Reagan	Dukakis	Clinton	Clinton	Bush	Bush	McCain	Romney	Trump	Trump	Trump
Wisconsin	Nixon	Carter	Reagan	Reagan	Dukakis	Clinton	Clinton	Gore	Kerry	Obama	Obama	Trump	Biden	Trump
Wyoming	Nixon	Ford	Reagan	Reagan	Bush	Bush	Dole	Bush	Bush	McCain	Romney	Trump	Trump	Trump

^1: Split their votes.

== Reaction ==
=== United States ===
The "Democratic blue" and "Republican red" color scheme is now part of the lexicon of American journalism.

Neither party national committee has officially accepted these color designations, though informal use by each party is becoming common. Both parties have since adopted logos that use their respective colors (a blue "D" for Democrats and a red "GOP" for Republicans). National conventions for both major parties increasingly feature the parties' respective colors, from the colors emphasized on convention podiums to the color conventioneers can be seen wearing on the delegate floor. The Democratic Congressional Campaign Committee also alluded to the color scheme when it launched a national "Red to Blue Program" in 2006.

The scheme has found acceptance and implementation from the U.S. federal government as the Federal Election Commission report for the 2004 presidential election uses the red-Republican and blue-Democratic scheme for its electoral map.

=== International ===
The choice of colors in this divide may appear counter-intuitive to non-American observers, as in most countries, red is associated with socialist, communist, or social democratic parties, while blue is associated with conservative (especially liberal conservative) parties. For example, the major center-right conservative parties in the United Kingdom, Canada, Australia, New Zealand, Brazil, Italy, Spain, France and Bavaria, all use blue or its shades (whether officially or unofficially) whereas the major socialist, communist, or social democratic parties in each country are associated with red (orange in Canada). If the U.S. followed such a pattern, blue would be used for the Republicans and red for the Democrats. However, the current U.S. scheme has become so ingrained in the American election system that foreign sources who cover U.S. elections, such as the BBC, Der Spiegel and El Mundo follow with the red-Republican, blue-Democratic scheme for U.S. elections.

== See also ==
- Blue wall – States that consistently vote for the Democratic Party in U.S. elections
- Cook Partisan Voting Index – Political statistical index
- Jesusland map – Satirical political map of North America
- Political culture of the United States
- Political ideologies in the United States
- Political party strength in U.S. states
- Red/blue provinces (Canada)
- Southern strategy – 20th-century Republican electoral strategy for the Southern US
- Southernization – Observation of American Southern values
- Swing state – US state where no party for election has overwhelming support
- United States presidential election maps on Wikimedia Commons
- Wave elections in the United States – Elections in which a political party makes major gains
