= Kishi =

Kishi may refer to:

== People ==
- Kishi (biblical figure)
- Aino Kishi (希志 あいの; born 1988), Japanese actress and AV Idol
- Asako Kishi (岸 朝子; 1923–2015), Japanese culinary critic
- Asuka Kishi (岸 明日香; born 1991), Japanese gravure idol, actress, and variety tarento
- Ayano Kishi (岸 彩乃; born 1992), Japanese trampoline gymnast
- Junichiro Kishi (岸 潤一郎; born 1996), Japanese baseball player
- Keiko Kishi (岸 惠子; 1932–2026), Japanese actress and writer
- Koichi Kishi (politician) (岸 宏一; 1940–2017), Japanese politician
- Koichi Kishi (composer) (貴志 康一; 1909–1937), Japanese composer, conductor and violinist
- Kichimatsu Kishi (1871–1956), Japanese–American agriculturalist
- Matsuo Kishi (岸 松雄; 1906–1985), Japanese film critic and screenwriter
- Nobusuke Kishi (岸 信介; 1896–1987), Japanese politician and prime minister
- Nobuo Kishi (岸 信夫; born 1959), Japanese politician, grandson of Nobusuke Kishi
- Shunji Kishi (貴志 俊治; born 1961), Japanese football player and manager
- Takayuki Kishi (岸 孝之; born 1984), Japanese baseball player
- Yoshito Kishi (1937–2023), Japanese-American chemist
- Yosuke Kishi (岸 洋佑; born 1993), Japanese singer and actor
- Yusuke Kishi (貴志 祐介; born 1959), Japanese author
- Yuta Kishi (岸 優太; born 1995), Japanese singer, actor and television personality
- Yūji Kishi (岸 祐二; born 1970), Japanese actor and voice actor

== Places ==
- Kishi, Hormozgan, Iran
- Kisi, Nigeria
- Kishi Station (disambiguation), several places

== Other uses ==
- Kishi (folklore), a two-faced demon in Angolan folklore
- Kishie, a type of basket native to the Shetland Islands

== See also ==
- Kish (disambiguation)
