= Shūji =

- Gender: Male

Origin
- Origin: Japanese
- Meaning: Different meanings depending on the kanji used

Shūji, Shuji or Shuuji (written: 修司, 修二, 修治, 修次, 州司, 収史, 秀司, 秀治, 秀史 or 秀爾) is a masculine Japanese given name. Notable people with the name include:

- Shūji Abe (阿部 秀司; 1949–2023), Japanese film producer
- Shuji Arinaga (有永 修二; born 1948), Japanese handball player
- Shuji Doi (土井 修爾; 1909–1938), Japanese water polo player
- Shuji Fujimoto (藤本 修司; born 1988), Japanese footballer
- Shūji Hayashi (林 修司; born 1979), Japanese actor
- Shuji Ikeguchi (池口 修次; born 1949), Japanese politician
- Shuji Imamoto (今本 秀爾; born 1965), Japanese environmentalist
- Isawa Shūji (伊澤 修二; 1851–1917), Japanese educator
- Shuji Ishikawa (石川 修司; born 1975), Japanese professional wrestler
- Shūji Iuchi (井内 秀治; born 1950), Japanese anime director
- Shuji Kashiwabara (柏原 収史; born 1978), Japanese actor
- Shuji Kataoka (片岡 修二; born 1950), Japanese film director and screenwriter
- Shuji Kawarada (瓦田 脩二; born 1994), Japanese kickboxer
- Shuji Kira (吉良 州司; born 1958), Japanese politician
- Shuji Kobayashi (小林 秀司; born 1939), Japanese speed skater
- Shuji Kondo (近藤 修司; born 1981), Japanese professional wrestler
- Shuji Kusano (草野 修治; born 1970), Japanese footballer
- Shūji Masutani (益谷秀次; 1888–1973), Japanese jurist and politician
- Shuji Matsuno (松野 修二; born 1963), Japanese badminton player
- Shuji Miyamoto (宮本 周司; born 1971), Japanese politician
- Shūji Muranaka (村中 秀史; born 1981), Japanese shogi player
- Shuji Nakamura (中村 修二; born 1954), Japanese academic
- Shuji Nakashima (中島 修二; born 1963), Japanese former rugby union player
- Shūji Nishiyama (西山 秀二; born 1967), Japanese retired professional catcher
- Shuji Ogino (荻野 周史; born 1968), Japanese molecular pathological epidemiologist, pathologist and epidemiologist
- Shuji Ono (小野 秀二; born 1958), Japanese former head coach
- Shūji Sano (佐野 周二; 1912–1978), Japanese actor
- Shūji Satō (shogi) (佐藤 秀司; born 1967), Japanese shogi player
- Shuji Sato (astronomer) (佐藤 修二; born 1945), Japanese astronomer
- Shūji Takashina (高階 秀爾; 1932–2024)), Japanese art historian and art critic
- Shuji Tazawa (田澤 修治; born 1968), Japanese sport shooter
- Shūji Terayama (寺山 修司; 1935–1983), Japanese poet, writer, film director and photographer
- Shuji Tsushima (known as Osamu Dazai) (津島 修治, 1909–1948), notable Japanese author, known for writing The Setting Sun and No Longer Human
- Shuji Tsurumi (鶴見 修治; born 1938), Japanese gymnast
- Shuji Ujino (氏野 修次; born 1960), Japanese former track and field athlete
- Shuji Utsumi (内海 州史; born 1961), Japanese business executive and video game producer
- Shuji Yamada (山田 修司; born 1956), Japanese volleyball player
- Shuji Yoshida (吉田 修司; born 1966), Japanese baseball player and coach

== Fictional characters ==
- Shuji, a supporting character in Bakugan Battle Brawlers
- Shuji Hanma, an antagonist from Tokyo Revengers
- Shuji Ikutsuki, a supporting character in Persona 3
- Shuji Ito, a main character in Mobile Suit Gundam GQuuuuuuX
- Shuji Ishii-Peters, a supporting character in Pen15

== See also ==
- 27396 Shuji, a main-belt asteroid
- Shunji
- Bīja
- Semolina, coarse middlings of durum wheat known as shuji in India
