= Kuji-in =

System of mudras

The kuji-in (Japanese: 九字印) or jiǔzìyìn (Chinese: 九字印), also known as nine hand seals, is a system of mudras and associated mantras that consist of nine syllables. The mantras are referred to as kuji (Japanese: 九字), which literally translates as nine characters. The syllables used in kuji are numerous, especially within Mikkyō (Japanese Esoteric Buddhism).

Scholars have stated that kuji is of Daoist rather than Buddhist origin. There is no mention of kuji in any of the Shingon or Tendai records brought to Japan.

The use of kuji is essentially a layman's practice and is uncommon in many orthodox Buddhist traditions. It is, however, found extensively in Shugendō, the ascetic mountain tradition of Japan, and in Ryōbu Shintō, which combined Shingon esoteric practices with shinbutsu-shūgō, the syncretism of Buddhist divinities with kami.

The nine Buddhist cuts in order are: rin, pyo, to, sha, kai, jin, retsu, zai, and zen.

== History ==
The kuji are first introduced in the Bàopǔzǐ (Chinese: 抱朴子), a Daoist text written by Gě Hóng (c. 280–340). He introduces the kuji in chapter 17, entitled Dēngshè (登涉, 'Climbing [Mountains] and Crossing [Rivers]'), as a prayer to the Liùjiǎ (六甲, 'Six Generals'), ancient gods. In Daoist magic, the Jiǎ are powerful celestial guardians and are among the gods of the Celestial Thunder Court of Emperor Xuanwu.

The kuji are first seen in line 5, which reads, 抱朴子曰：“入名山，以甲子開除日，以五色繒各五寸，懸大石上，所求必得。又曰，入山宜知六甲秘祝。祝曰，臨兵鬭者，皆陣列前行。凡九字，常當密祝之，無所不辟。要道不煩，此之謂也。”

Translation:

To enter a famous mountain, choose an opening day, which can be determined by its cyclical binary. Hang silk of the five colors, each piece five inches wide, from a large rock, so that you may be sure to succeed in your goal. Furthermore, while entering the mountains you must know the Six-Chia secret prayer. It goes like: "May the presiders over warriors be my vanguard!" This nine word prayer must constantly be recited in secret. It means, "May all evils flee me and the essential procedure present no trouble." (Write, 1966)

The kuji form a grammatically correct sentence in Classical Chinese. They come from this section of the chapter. They are written as Chinese: 臨兵鬭者，皆陣列前行; pinyin: lín bīng dòu zhě jiē zhèn liè qián xíng which can be roughly translated, "(Celestial) soldiers/fighters descend and arrange yourselves in front of me", or "May all those who preside over warriors be my vanguard!"

Other translations are possible, as variations exist within Mikkyō (Japanese Esoteric Buddhism). According to the Baopuzi, the kuji is a prayer to avert difficulties and baleful influences and to ensure that things proceed smoothly. To this end, it can be said that the primary purpose of kuji is abhiṣeka (Japanese: 正灌頂, romanized: shōkanjō) and exorcism (Japanese: 調伏, romanized: chōbuku).

The kuji are next cited in a text called The commentary on the discourse about the Sutra on Immeasurable Life, and on the verses about the vow to be reborn [in the Pure Land] (無量壽經優婆提舍願生偈註 Wúliàng shòu jīng yōu pó tí shě yuàn shēng jì zhù), also known as the Commentary on the Treatise on Rebirth in the Pure Land (往生論註, Wǎngshēng lùn zhù) written by the Pure Land Buddhist Taluan (467?–542? CE).

How the kuji arrived in Japan is still a matter of debate. Some contemporary scholars assert that the kuji arrived in Japan via China, via Jōdo-shū and Shugendō, around the 8th century, if not later. As to what the kuji consisted of at the time it arrived in Japan is unknown. Mudras are found in Daoism as well as in Shugendō. Some have suggested that Shugendō created the mudras currently associated with the kuji, as most of the information known about the kuji comes from Shugendō literature.

== Kuji's origins ==
The earliest known Japanese application of the kuji comes from the Shingon monk Kakuban (1095–1143), who was an academic of Taluan's writings and teachings. Kakuban introduced several kuji formulas dedicated to Amitābha, in his text The Illuminating Secret Commentary on the Five Chakras and the Nine Syllables (五輪九字明秘密義釈, Gorin kuji myō himitsu gishaku or 五輪九字 Gorin kuji hishaku).

The kuji formulas Kakuban introduces are commonly grouped under the title zokushu, and are entirely unrelated to original Daoist kuji. The monk Shinran (1173–1263 CE), founder of Jōdo Shinshū sect, introduced several new kuji formulas, also dedicated to Amitābha. Nichiren, founder of Nichiren Buddhism, introduced a kuji prayer derived from chapter 26 of the Lotus Sutra, where it is uttered by the god Vaiśravaṇa.

Neither Kūkai, the founder of Shingon, nor Saichō, the founder of Tendai, mentioned kuji in any of their writings. It may be assumed that they were unfamiliar with the kuji or that they considered them only part of a minor teaching. Regardless, the nine syllables of the kuji have been associated with several religious and philosophical aspects of Japanese esoteric Buddhism. They are associated with the five chakras (五輪, gorin), the five elements (五大, godai), specific directions of the compass, colors, and deities.

== Variations on the ryōbu kuji ==
There are numerous variations of the nine original kuji in Japanese Buddhism. Most of these variations occurred well after the introduction of the kuji into Japan. Some, however, are other formulas taken from Daoist and Buddhist texts. The kuji that is most often seen in the context of budo, or martial arts, and also in general, consists of the nine original syllables ([Celestial] soldiers/fighters descend and arrange yourselves in front of me).

The fact that the nine original kuji are not seen in Japanese documents and writings until at least the last years of the Muromachi period (1500s), and not extensively until around the Edo (1603–1868) and Meiji (1868–1912), indicates that they were either not extensively practiced, or taught as oral tradition (口伝, kuden). However, the fact that so many ko-ryū list kuji in their makimono indicates it must have been considered an essential teaching (goku-i). The fact that kuji are listed in numerous kobudō makimono from the 1500s onward is proof that the kuji were practiced by samurai.

== Significance of the number nine ==
The number nine is seen in Daoist divination as the perfect number for yang, the “bright side” when determining the individual hexagram lines according to the Yijing. Some have suggested that the number nine refers to the nine planets, which Daoists believe directly influence human destiny, or to the seven stars of the Big Dipper (Northern Seven Stars) plus the two attendant/guardian stars, which Daoists believe is the gateway to heaven, and each star is a deity. The Imperial Palace had nine halls; the celestial sphere has nine divisions; in both Buddhism and Taoism, heaven is 'nine enclosures' (jiuchong). The nine sub-mandalas of the Mandala of the Two Realms correspond to the imperial city of Chang'an. (Waterhouse, 1996)

== Kuji no in (hand seals of the nine syllables) ==
The kuji-in (Japanese: 九字印), “nine hand seals,” refers to the mudra (hand seals/gestures) associated with the nine syllables themselves, whereas kuji-ho refers to the entire ritual of kuji and encompasses the mudra, mantra and meditation. Kuji-kan (nine syllable visualization) is a specialized form of Buddhist meditation. Technically the word “kuji no in” refers only to the hand postures (mudra), whereas “kuji no shingon” refers to the related incantations (mantra). There are hundreds of mudras in Shingon alone. Shugendō itself has hundreds of mudras, as does Taoism. Many of these mudras are shared; however, many are not. To further complicate this fact, there are also untold numbers of variations on a given mudra, and many mudras are associated with more than one deity or idea. Furthermore, a mudra may have more than one name, or one association depending on its purpose. Practitioners would be wise to keep this in mind when practicing kuji ho.

== Yin and yang and kuji ==
The dualistic influence of inyogoku (yin and yang dualism) is apparent only in respects to the mudra of certain kuji rituals. As stated earlier the kuji in and of itself is a simple prayer. The obvious influences of onmyōdō (the way of yin and yang) is clearly seen in the mudra themselves which were added later. Especially in regard to the first and last mudras, the mudras associated with the syllables "to" and "sha", "kai" and "jin". These mudras are obvious yin and yang counterparts. This is significant in that the concept of yin and yang is seen as encompassing all the cosmic phenomena, all eternity between the two polar opposites. The mudra gejishi-in (gesture of the outer lion) and its immediate counterpart naijishi-in (gesture of the inner lion) clearly represent this yin and yang relation. In fact, not only do these two related mudras represent the alpha and omega by themselves, but the two lions associated with them take this association a step further. The two lions are commonly seen outside the doors of Buddhist temples, where they stand as guardians against evil and baleful influences. The first lion utters the sound “A” which symbolizes the alpha, that all reality and phenomena are, in the tradition of mikkyō, said to neither absolutely exist, nor non-exist – they arise in dependence on conditions, and cease when those conditions cease. Whereas the second lion utters the sound “un” (hūm) which symbolizes the omega, the destruction of all evils; it summarizes the two basic false views of nihilism and externalism and shows them to be false. The truth of things is that they are neither real nor unreal. This description also applies to the next two mudra, gebbaku-in (gesture of the outer bond) and its immediate counterpart neibbaku-in (gesture of the inner bound). The first (dokko-in, kongōshin-in) and last mudra (hobyo-in, ongyō-in), occupy the two most important positions, the beginning and the end, again with relation to the Taoist and mikkyō points of view of the alpha and omega.

In relation to yin and yang theory, the yang aspect is the light, masculine, positive, offensive, absolute, horizontal, left, forward, upward. While the yin aspect is the dark, feminine, negative, defensive, relative, vertical, right, backward, down. (Waterhouse, 1996)

== Ryobu kuji and the martial arts ==
Ku-ji ho as generally practiced in budo comes from text Sugen jinpi gyoho fuju shu or Fuju shu for short, a Shugendō document of the Tozan-ha lineage, edited between 1871 and 1934 by Nakuno Tatsue. The original compiler is unknown, but it appears to incorporate numerous Shugendō rituals from various Shingon sects such as Tachikawa-ryu. The text compilation of texts appears to span a time period from the 1200s on up to 1500s and 1600s. The Fuju shu lists 400 rituals, 26 of them kuji-ho. (Waterhouse, 1996).

The two particular techniques of ku-ji that are most directly related to budo, and most widely known are kuji hon-i (Fuju Shu #199) and kuji no daiji (Fuju Shu #200). These two kuji rituals are centered in the esoteric deities of Shingon mikkyo, the Shidaitenno (Four Heavenly Kings) and Godai myo-o (Five Wisdom Kings). Other groupings of deities exist as well depending on the sect and purpose of the kuji.

== Kuji-kiri (cutting the nine syllables) ==
The related practice of making nine cuts – five horizontal and four vertical, alternating – in the air or palm of a hand with the finger or on paper with a brush is known as kuji-kiri (九字切り), nine syllable cuts. Kuji-kiri is explained in Shugendo texts, quite correctly, as a preparatory ritual of protection, to cut off demonic influences and their inki (vital substance) (Waterhouse, 1996). In Japanese folk magic and onmyōdō, the nine cuts are often made over writing or a picture, to gain control of the object named or pictured. Thus, a sailor wishing to be protected from drowning might write them over the kanji for "sea" or "water". Author and historian John Stevens notes that methods of oral sex using kuji-kiri were employed by practitioners of Tachikawa-ryu. The Fuju shu does not spell out every ritual in detail. However, in several of the kuji-kiri rituals it is spelled out that the strokes are made alternately horizontal and then vertical: five horizontal and four vertical for men; and four horizontal and five vertical for women. A modern Japanese text labeled Dai Marishi-Ten hiju/大摩利子天秘授 (Nine syllables of the Tactics of the Great Goddess of Light (Marishi-Ten)) says that five horizontal slashes are made while reciting the yo-syllables: rin, toh, kai, retsu, zen, which spells (come, fight, ready, line up, in front) first. These are to be followed by four vertical slashes while reciting the in-syllables: pyo, sha, jin, zai which spells (warriors, one formation, take position). The document gives no other information as to why this arrangement is used.

== Kuji-ho in practice ==
Ku-ji is a highly flexible practice that can be adapted to the practitioner's needs. The practice of ku-ji ho, as found in Japanese esoteric Buddhism, is a sanmitsu nenju (concentrated three mysteries practice) comprising several interdependent, integrated practices. It can be practiced in the form of either of the Mandala of the Two Realms, the Kongo-kai/金剛界 or the Taizo-kai/胎蔵界 mandala. It is also used by other sects, especially in Japan; by some Daoists and practitioners of Shinto and Chinese folk religion; and in other folk religions throughout East Asia.

In general, simply offering incense, reciting the kuji with hands in gasho, and being mindful and present is sufficient to appease Jiǎ.

The kuji-in practice symbolizes that all the forces of the universe are united against evil; because of this, it was often used by ordinary people for luck when traveling, especially in the mountains.

== Mantra and mudra ==
In Japanese, the nine syllables are rin (臨), pyō (兵), tō (闘), sha (者), kai (皆), jin (陣), retsu (列), zai (在), and zen (前). If the nine cuts are then made, as is sometimes done, the syllable kō (行) is sometimes spoken.

Note that the syllables are shortened forms, and there are also longer, Japanese mantra that go with the same mudra. As to why there appears to be no correlation between the mudra and mantra and the representative deities is unknown at this time. Also, many mantras end with the Sanskrit word o'ṃ (om). The meaning of o'ṃ is literally "to shout loudly", while the esoteric religious meaning is seen as the sacred name or essence of God and means "I am existence". It is used at the end of the invocation to the god being sacrificed to (anuvakya) as an invitation to and for that god to partake of the sacrifice. divi There is no indication of where this particular kuji ritual comes from. It seems to be one of more common forms of the Buddhist (possibly Shugendo) kuji. If the original source is discovered, it will be made available.

The mudra [hand postures] are as follows:

臨 (Rin): Hands together, fingers interlocked. The index (sometimes middle) fingers are raised and pressed together.

Mudra is, dokko-in/kongoshin-in, "seal of the thunderbolt."

Note: the mudra dokko-in is associated with Tammon-ten/Bishamon-ten. Whereas the mudra kongoshin-in is the mudra of Taishaku-ten (Indra)

Mantra is, On baishiramantaya sowaka. [All hail the glory of Vaiśravaṇa (The one who likes to hear the Dharma). o'ṃ] [Eng.]

Note: this is the mantra of Tamon-ten/多聞天 (a.k.a. Bishamon-ten) (Vaiśravaṇa)

兵 (Pyō): Hands together, pinkies and ring fingers interlocked (often on the inside). Index finger and thumb raised and pressed together, middle fingers cross over index fingers and their tips curl back to touch the thumbs' tips, the middle-fingers' nails touching.

Mudra is, daikongorin-in, "seal of the great thunderbolt."

Mantra is, On ishanaya intaraya sowaka. (All hail the instrument of divine righteousness, o'ṃ)

闘 (Tō): Hands together, index fingers cross each other to touch opposite ring fingers, middle fingers crossed over them. Ring and pinky fingers are straight. Tips of ring fingers pressed together, tips of pinkies pressed together, but both sets of ring and pinky fingers are separated to form a V shape or bird beak.

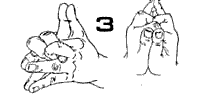

Mudra is, gejishi-in, "seal of the outer lion."

Note: this mudra is not found in Shingon. But is rather a Shugendo mudra.

Mantra is, On jiterashi itara jiva ratanō sowaka. [All hail the exultant and glorious celestial jewel, o'ṃ]

Note: this mudra is associated with the pair of lions which stand guard over Buddhist temples, in particular the lion who utters the sound "a", the alpha.

者 (Sha): Hands together, ring fingers cross each other to touch opposite index fingers, middle fingers crossed over them. Index finger, pinky and thumb straight, like American Sign Language "I love you".

Mudra is, naijishi-in, "seal of the inner lion."

Note: this mudra is not found in Shingon. But is rather a Shugendo mudra.

mantra is, On hayabaishiramantaya sowaka. (All hail the swift thunderbolt of exalted strength, virtue, and glory! o'ṃ)

Note: this mudra is associated with the pair of lions which stand guard over Buddhist temples, in particular the lion who utters the sound "Un" (hūṃ), the omega.

Note: The Sanskrit word haya as in the prefix of the god Hayagriva means "horse" (bato – Jpn.) and is used to denote the concept of "swift", "to ride", "to harness", Etc.

皆 (Kai): Hands together, fingers interlocked.

Mudra is, gebaku-in, "seal of the outer bonds."

Mantra is, On nōmaku sanmanda basaradan kan. [Homage to all-pervading diamond thunderbolts. Utterly crush and devour! o'ṃ] [Eng.]

Note: this is the "One Word Mantra/不動一字呪 of Fudo myo-O (Acalanatha)

Note: The Sanskrit bija/bonji (esoteric syllable) haṃ (Kan – Jpn.) is a concept that cannot be exactly defined. It is the bija of Hayagriva and also Acala, and symbolizes a divine weapon of sorts, like a vajra spear or vajra sword thrown or wielded against an enemy, and denotes something like "split", break", "devour", or "crush", referring to the devouring of all evils. The "ṃ" at the end with the anusvara (nasal) is the universal symbol.

陣 (Jin): Hands together, fingers interlocked, with the fingertips inside.

Mudra is, naibaku-in, "seal of the inner bonds."

Mantra is, On aganaya in maya sowaka. [All hail the glory of Agni (God of the Sacred Fire). o'ṃ!]

列 (Retsu): Left hand in an upward-pointing fist, index finger raised. Right hand grips index finger, and thumb is pressed onto left index's nail.

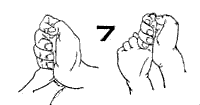

Mudra is, Chiken-in, "seal of the wisdom fist," also known as "seal of the interpenetration of the two realms."

Note: this is the primary mudra associated with Dainichi Nyorai (Vairocana)

Mantra is, On irotahi chanoga jiba tai sowaka. [All hail the radiant divine all-illuminating light, bursting and streaming forth in all directions, o'ṃ]

在 (Zai): Hands spread out in front, with thumb and index finger touching.

Mudra is, hokkai-jō-in, "seal of the ring of the Sun, Moon, and Earth."

Mantra is, On chirichi iba rotaya sowaka. (Glory to Divine perfection, o'ṃ)

前 (Zen): Hands form a circle, thumbs on top and fingers on the bottom, right hand overlapping left up to the knuckles.

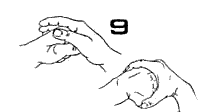

Mudra: hobyo-in/ongyo-in "seal of the hidden form, mudra which conceals its form"

Note: The mudra hobyo-in is associated with Fugen Bosatsu (Samantabhadra) in the Kongo-Kai mandara, as well as Ichiji Kinrin. Whereas the mudra ongyo-in is a mudra associated with Marishi-Ten (Marici).

mantra: On a ra ba sha nō sowaka [All hail! A ra pa ca na. o'ṃ)

Note: this is mantra of Monju bosatsu (Mañjusri Bodhisattva)

Note: Each letter of this bija mantra is associated with some point of the Dharma, and all together are referred to as the syllable-doors (to the Dharma). The 'power' of these syllables is somewhat cryptically explained, but the point is that all of the reflections are pointing towards the nature of sunyata.

Note: There is no further translation to this mantra. It is composed entirely of bija/bonji and cannot be reduced any further.

Without any further information regarding this particular kuji ho the best guess is as follows:

- 臨/Rin: Tammon-Ten (Vaiśravaṇa)
- 兵/Pyō: ?
- 闘/Tō: ?
- 者/Shā: Bato myo-O (Hayagriva), Taishaku-Ten (Indra)
- 皆/Kai: Fudo myo-O (Acala)
- 陣/Jin: Ka-Ten (Agni)
- 列/Retsu: Dainichi Nyorai (Vairocana)
- 在/Zai: Marishi-Ten (Marici)
- 前/Zen: Monju bosatsu (Mañjusri)

Without further information no other conclusions can be made.

== Meaning of kuji symbolism ==
The influence of Taoism is very apparent in the practice of ku-ji, in that there are yin/in and yang/yō aspects to ku-ji that must be taken into consideration by the practitioner. There are five yang/yō-syllables, and four yin/in-syllables. In onmyōdō philosophy yin/in is related to relative, to benefit self, defensive; yang/yō is absolute, to use against others, offensive. Thus, when looking at the implied meaning of the syllables in ku-ji it is apparent that the in-syllables are used to defend the self, and the yō-syllables are used to attack outside influences.

The yin and yang theory of kuji also carries over to kuji kiri. In kuji kiri the vertical strokes/slashes represent the yin/in syllables, while the horizontal strokes/slashes represent the yang/yo syllables. Thus, in kuji kiri the practitioner is first making an aggressive horizontal slash representing the first syllable which is a yang/yo which represents the absolute aspect or offensive nature of the deity. The second stroke/slash is defensive and represents the second syllable or relative aspect or defensive nature of the deity.

Often a tenth syllable is added at the end. Generally, it is the mata [syllable] for victory, or "to destroy".

Yang/Yō syllables [horizontal, absolute]

- 臨/Rin: come
- 闘/Tō: fight
- 皆/Kai: ready
- 列/Retsu: line-up
- 前/Zen: in front

Yin/In syllables [vertical, relative]

- 兵/Pyō: warriors
- 者/Shā: one
- 陣/Jin: formation
- 在/Zai: take position

Thus the essence of the meaning of the ku-ji can be roughly translated as,

Taoist: “May all those who preside over warriors be my vanguard.”

Japanese: "Come warriors, fight as one, ready in formation, line up and take position in front. Destroy/victory!"

Each of the nine syllables has a meaning that when integrated with the corresponding mudra, mantra, and visualization [corresponding deity] manifests sanmitsu kaji [grace, virtue, merit of the Three mysteries]. In general, it can be said that ku-ji is the harnessing and control of psychospiritual or psychophysical energies, and, or, of cosmic–universal spirits/deities/energies.

The deities most commonly called upon in mikkyo (esoteric Buddhism, Vajaryana-tantra) are deities of Hindu and Tantric origin, which are ultimately all emanations of Dainichi Nyorai (Mahavairocana). These deities are the shi-ten-no (Four Heavenly Kings) and the Godai myō-Ō (Five Wisdom Kings), as well as Marishi-ten (Marici), Nit-ten (Surya), Bon-ten (Brahma), Ichiji Kinrin Bochto (Ekaksa-rosnisa-cakra, or Ekasara-buddhosnisa-cakra), and so on.

With relation to Japanese esoteric Buddhism [mikkyo], the yang/yō-syllables represent the shi-ten-no, with the exception of the “kai” syllable which represents Fudo-myō-o (Acala). The yin/in-syllables represents the Godai myō-o. A simple look at the ku-ji and their relation to the prescribed deities shows a very logical pattern. The ku-ji and associated deities form a simple mandara, with Fudō myō-Ō at his rightful and proper place in the center, surrounded by the other four Myō at their respective locations, which comprises the inner sanctum–hall of the mandara. The shidaitenno being of a lower rank–office than the Myō, occupy the outer sanctum/hall of the mandara at their respective positions.

=== Fuju shu #199, kuji hon-i ===
Yō/yang syllables

- 臨/Rin: Tammon-ten/Bishamon-ten (Vaisravana – Skt.)
- 闘/Tō: Jikoku-ten (Dhrtarastra – Skt.)
- 皆/Kai: Fudo myō-o (Acalanatha -Skt.)
- 列/Retsu: Komoku-ten (Virūpākṣa – Skt.)
- 前/Zen: Zocho-ten (Virudhaka -Skt.)

In/yin syllables

- 兵/Pyō: Gonzanze myō-o/Shozonzae myo-o (Trailokyavijaya -Skt.)
- 者/Shā: Kongō-yaksha myō-o (Vajrayaksa – Skt.)
- 陣/Jin: Gundari myō-o (Kundali -Skt.)
- 在/Zai: Dai-itoku myō-o (Yamantaka -Skt.)

=== Fuju shu #200, kuji no daiji ===
This is the other kuji ho that most directly deals with the martial arts, the most direct being the above kuji hon-i.

Yō/yang syllables

- 臨/Rin: Tammon-ten/Bishamon-ten (Vaisravana – Skt.)
- 闘/Tō: Nyoirin
- 皆/Kai: Aizen Myo-O (Ragaraja)
- 列/Retsu: Amida Nyorai (Amitābha)
- 前/Zen: Monju bosatsu (Mañjuśrī)

In/yin syllables

- 兵/Pyō: Juichimen Kan'non (Ekadasa-mukha)
- 者/Shā: Fudosan (Ācalanātha)
- 陣/Jin: Sho Kan'non (Āryāvalokitesvara)
- 在/Zai: Miroku Bosatsu (Maitreya)

Other groupings of the ku-ji include:

=== A] Kujisuijaku [Nine Planets][Fuju Shu no. 197] ===
In Fuju #197 and #198 which relates to the nine planets and Seven Northern Stars, the purpose of the kuji-ho is to obtain protection, as well as longevity; and the correlations with the nine planets and Seven Northern Stars. The idea was to perform the ritual to remove bad or baleful influences which a particular star or stars might in exerting over at that time over a person in a particular age group, by converting it into an auspicious star, planet, and influence.

- 臨/Rin: Keitosei [Descending lunar node], southwest, Jizo bosatsu
- 兵/Pyō: Nichiyōsei [Sun], northeast, Sunday, Fudo myo-O
- 闘/Tō: Mokuyōsei [Jupiter], east, Thursday, Monju bosatsu
- 者/Shā: Kayōsei [Mars], south, Tuesday, Hachiman bosatsu
- 皆/Kai: Ragosei [Ascending lunar node], southeast, Dainichi Nyorai
- 陣/Jin: Doyōsei [Saturn], center, Saturday, Kan'non bosatsu
- 列/Retsu: Getsuyōsei [Moon], northwest, Monday, Fugen bosatsu
- 在/Zai: Kin-yōsei [Venus], west, Friday, Kokuzo bosatsu
- 前/Zen: Suiyōsei [Mercury], north, Wednesday, Seishi bosatsu

Note: if Myoken bosatsu is included at the end, kujisuijaku becomes jujisuijaku or ten stars/十曜星. Myoken is the primary deity of worship of the shukuyoo/宿曜 or nine constellations/planets.

=== B] Kujihonji [Northern Seven Stars (Big Dipper Ursa Major))] [Fuju Shu 198] ===
- 臨/Rin: Donrōshō/貪狼星; Nichirin Bosatsu; [Dubhe; Alpha Ursae Majoris (α UMa / α Ursae Majoris)]
- 兵/Pyō: Komoshō/巨門星; Gachirin Bosatsu; [Merak; Beta Ursae Majoris (β UMa / β Ursae Majoris)]
- 闘/Tō: Rokuzonshō/禄存星; Kōmyōshō; [Phecda, Phekda or Phad; Gamma Ursae Majoris (γ UMa / γ Ursae Majoris)]
- 者/Shā: Monkokushō/文曲星; Zōchō Bosatsu; [Megrez; Delta Ursae Majoris (δ UMa / δ Ursae Majoris)]
- 皆/Kai: Renjōshō/簾貞星; Ekoshō Bosatsu; [Alioth; Epsilon Ursae Majoris (ε UMa / ε Ursae Majoris)]
- 陣/Jin: Mukokushō/武曲星; Jizō Bosatsu; Mizar; (ζ UMa / ζ Ursae Majoris)]
- 列/Retsu: Hagunshō/破軍星; Kongōshu Bosatsu (Fugen bosatsu) (Samantabhadra -Skt.); [Alkaid (or Elkeid) and Benetnash (Benetnasch); Eta Ursae Majoris (η UMa / η Ursae Majoris)]

Two attendant stars

- 在/Zai: Gatten; M101 [The Pin Wheel Galaxy] located to the north of Alkaid
- 前/Zen: Nitten; M51 [The Whirlpool Galaxy] located to the south of Alkaid

=== C] Zokushu ===
Zokushu is the earliest known Buddhist adaptation of the kuji. It is a kuji ritual based on Kakuban's formula, in which each of the kuji corresponds to a shuji/bonji/bija. However, instead of the original nine Taoist syllables, Kakuban created a new set of nine syllables based on the mantra of Amida Nyorai. There are in fact several zokushu rituals that Kakuban designed. The ritual itself is based on the deities Avalokitesvara [Kan'non bosatsu], and Amida buddha (Amitabha) as well as the nine deities of the inner sanctum of the Taizo-kai mandara/胎蔵界曼荼羅 (Garbhadhatu). Zokushu is based on Jodoshu [Pure land sect] and therefore the primary deity of worship is Amida Nyorai.

Zokushu #5

Zokushu #5 gives lists the nine original Taoist syllables and gives a corresponding Japanese syllable. The shuji themselves when placed in order of their corresponding kuji form no logical sentence or statement, and may represent Sanskrit bija, and, or Tantric deities, or it may be a prayer. Without further evidence, no other conclusions can be made.

- 臨/Rin: Ri
- 兵/Pyō: Na
- 闘/Tō: Tan
- 者/Shā: Sha
- 皆/Kai: Ku
- 陣/Jin: Chirin
- 列/Retsu: Raku
- 在/Zai: Rau
- 前/Zen: Ron

Ri-na-tan-sha-ku-chirin-raku-rau-ron

It is unclear how this set of kuji is related to the Sanskrit bija Kakuban gives for the primary zokushu kuji, which is the mantra of Amida buddha.

Um, a, mr, ta, te, je, ha, ra, hum

which compose the mantra,

Om amrta tese (teje) hara hum [Om to the elixir/nectar of immortality of most exalted virtues and noble strengths, to the heavenly queen Amida buddha, hum.] or [Om save us in the glory of the Deathless One hûm].

Another kuji formula is found in the writings of Jodo Shinshu, founded by Shinran, and is yet another mantra to Amida Nyorai which reads:

Na, mu, fu, ka, shi, gi, ko, nyo, rai

Which spells the mantra, Namu fukashigi-ko Nyorai (Homage to the Tathāgata [buddha] of inconceivable light.)

A juji formula is then given with the syllables,

Ki, myō, jin, jip, pō, mu, ge, kō, nyo, rai

This spells the mantra, Kimyo jinjippō mugekō Nyorai (Homage to the Tathāgata [buddha] whose light shines without obstruction universally in the ten directions!)

It may be that this juji ritual is based on, or connected to an older Taoist juji formula,

Ten-ryū-ko-ō-shō-ze-myō-ki-sui-dai

Kakuban then goes on to give a list of deities related to the mantra of Avalokiteśvara (Kan'non)

- A: Avalokiteśvara (Kan'non Bosatsu)
- Mŗ: Maitreya (Miroku Bosatsu)
- Ta: Ākāśagarbha (Kokūzō Bosatsu/虚 空 蔵)
- Te: Samantabhadra (Fugen Bosatsu)
- Se: Vajrapani (Kongō shu bosatsu /金剛手菩薩. Vajrapani is associated with Acala who is venerated as Fudo-Myo and is serenaded as the holder of the Vajra
- Ha: Manjusri (Monju Bosatsu)
- Ra: Sarvanivarana-Vishkambhin (Sarvanivāraṇaviṣkambhin)
- Hūm: Ksitigarbha (Jizo Bosatsu)
- Hrīh: Avalokiteśvara (Kan'non Bostsu)

Note: the deletion of the Om syllable in the beginning and addition of the Hrīh] syllable is an adaptation. Hrīh signifies the element metal and lungs. The placement of Avalokiteśvara at the beginning and end obviously signifies that the other deities are contained within Avalokiteśvara.

Rather these kuji and juji originated strictly within Japanese Buddhism is unlikely as Jodo Shinshu is, like many things in Japanese theology, influenced by Taoism. And it is also safe to assume that both Kakuban and Shinran would have been familiar with the various Taoist kuji and juji formulas. Rather or not their kuji and juji formulas are Japanese versions of Taoist formulas may never be known. However, what is clear is that they represent the earliest known use of the kuji and juji in Japanese esoteric Buddhism [mikkyo]. (Waterhouse, 1996)

Again, in the absences of further evidence no other conclusions can be made.

The same ritual goes on to give a list of related Taoist deities.

=== C.2] ===
- 臨/Rin: Taishi
- 兵/Pyō: Suzaku
- 闘/Tō: Bunno
- 者/Shā: Genbu
- 皆/Kai: Santei
- 陣/Jin: Byakko
- 列/Retsu: Gyokujo
- 在/Zai: Kyuchin
- 前/Zen: Seiryu

=== D] Shinto deities related to kuji ===
Lastly, in the late Edo jidai the kuji were practiced by various Shinto schools. And therefore, a set of correlations was developed between the kuji and various Shinto schools and related deities. Below is one such list belonging to a Shinto school in the Yamato region.

- 臨/Rin: Tensho Kodaijingu/ Amaterasu Omikami
- 兵/Pyō: Sho Hachiman Daijin
- 闘/Tō: Kasuga Daimyojin
- 者/Shā: Kamo Daimyojin
- 皆/Kai: Inari Daimyojin
- 陣/Jin: Sumiyoshi Daimyojin
- 列/Retsu: Tanyu Daimyojin
- 在/Zai: Nittenshi
- 前/Zen: Marishi-Ten (Marici -Skt.)

=== E] Tammon-Ten’s kaji kuji (Vaisravana’s nine syllable empowerment) ===
Another kuji prayer is outlined by the monk Nichiei (Nichiren), and is found in chapter 26 of the Lotus Sutra where it is uttered by the deva King of the North, Tammon-ten/Bishamon-ten (Vaisravana), and is said to guarantee protection to those who recite it.

The verse goes (CH 26 Lotus sutra):

"Thereupon, the devarāja Vaiśravaṇa, a world-protector, addressed the Buddha, saying: “O Bhagavat! I will also teach a dhāraṇī out of pity for sentient beings and in order to protect expounders of the Dharma.” He then recited a dhāraṇī, saying:

Aṭṭe naṭṭe vanaṭṭe anaḍe nāḍi kunaḍi (Skt.); (Ryo-hyaku-yu-jun-nai-mu-sho-sui-gen)(Jpn.)

“O Bhagavat! With this mantra-dhāraṇī I protect the expounders of the Dharma; I will also protect those who hold to this sutra. All heavy cares shall be banished for a hundred yojanas around.” [Cause all feeble sickness to be naught a distance of a hundred yojans (approximately 1,000 miles/1,600 km)]

=== F] Jioku-ten's kaji kuji (Dhṛtarāṣṭra's nine syallable empowerment) ===
Also in chapter 26 of the Lotus Sutra immediately following Vaiśravaṇa, the Great King Dhṛtarāṣṭra (Jioku-Ten) Guardian of the eastern quarter announces a kuji in Sanskrit to complement Vaiśravaṇa's dharani. The verse goes:

"At that time the devarāja Dhṛtarāṣṭra the great Heavenly King and Upholder of the Nation was present in the assembly, respectfully surrounded by millions upon million of myriads of koṭis of nayutas of gandharvas. He came before the Buddha together with them and addressed the Buddha with his palms pressed together, saying: “O Bhagavat! With a mantra-dhāraṇī I will also protect those who hold to the Lotus Sutra.” He then recited the dhāraṇī, saying:

Agni Gauri gandhāri caṇḍāli matangi jaṅguli vrūsaṇi agasti."

“O Bhagavat! This mantra-dhāraṇī was spoken by forty-two koṭis of buddhas. Anyone who attacks or slanders an expounder of the Dharma also attacks or slanders these buddhas."

=== Conclusion ===
As it should be apparent, the kuji are a very adaptable ritual which has, and will likely continue to be, adapted to the local needs of the individual or organization. In so long as the overall structure of esoteric practice is understood, that being the practice of sanmitsu, then the kuji can be adopted to fit almost any need.

== Meanings in Shinto ==
Each word is translated to the following meaning for Shinto.

- Rin: To face.
- Pyō: The soldier.
- Tō: To fight.
- Sha: The man (or the people); a foe
- Kai: The all, or the whole effect, or whole effort.
- Jin: In Formation, or position in camp or to prepare.
- Retsu: To move in column or a row, in a line; or marching, or to focus.
- Zai: To appear, or to exist to make yourself known, or create existence.
- Zen: To be in front, or show up in front.

Kuji-in is used as part of a ritual in Shinto, and is used to purify a person with a waterfall.

== Meanings in Buddhism ==
Each word is translated to the following meaning in Buddhism.

- Rin, To confront
- Pyō, To soldier on
- Tō, To battle with
- Sha, Against one/person
- Kai, With everyone/entire/group
- Jin, The formation
- Retsu, In a row
- Zai, To presence
- Zen, To move forward

There as many as 81 variations to the Kuji-in within certain sects of Buddhism in Japan, to say nothing of other mudra that are also used.

== Meanings in ninjutsu ==
While the kuji-in have no unique relation to ninjutsu, the ninja traditions are steeped in esoteric Buddhist beliefs, especially Mikkyo. The kuji-in, known here as Kuji-kiri, are used in a number of their meditations, both those related simply to their religious practice and those dealing with their martial arts; in some ways, they are used similarly to the Taoist ideas in Chinese internal martial arts (some of the ideas of Chinese internal arts are, however, incorporated in many Japanese arts, including ninjutsu and jujutsu). In his book Ninja Vol. II: Warrior Ways of Enlightenment, Stephen K. Hayes claims the following interpretations:

- Rin – Strength
- Pyō – Channel
- Tō – Harmony
- Sha – Healing
- Kai – Sense of Danger
- Jin – Reading of thoughts
- Retsu – Control of space and time
- Zai – Control of sky and elements
- Zen – Enlightenment

The kuji-in are a tool to be used in meditation, and are frequently over-simplified in popular culture as being a form of magic. This belief, along with the use of the mudra and mantra, has been further popularized by Tekken, Tenchu, Dead or Alive and certain neo-ninja games. The lines of the Chinese poem, compounding the syllables, reads "Nozomeru Hei, tatakau mono, kaijin wo hari, retsu wo tukutte, mae ni ari".

== See also ==
- Glossary of Shinto
- Glossary of Japanese Buddhism
- Kuji-kiri
- Mudra
- Om
- Katsu (Zen)
