= 2004 United States presidential election in Hawaii =

- November 2, 2004

Nominee	John Kerry	George W. Bush
Party	Democratic	Republican
Home state	Massachusetts	Texas
Running mate	John Edwards	Dick Cheney
Electoral vote	4	0
Popular vote	231,708	194,191
Percentage	54.01%	45.26%
County results
Kerry
50–60%
60–70%
President before election
George W. Bush
Republican
Elected President
George W. Bush
Republican

The 2004 United States presidential election in Hawaii took place on November 2, 2004. Voters chose four representatives, or electors, to the Electoral College, who voted for president and vice president.

Prior to the election, all leading news organizations considered this a state Kerry would win, or otherwise considered as a safe blue state. The state has voted Republican only twice since statehood (in the 49-state Republican landslides of 1972 and 1984).

Hawaii was won by Democratic nominee John Kerry by an 8.7% margin. This is the last time Hawaii was decided by a single-digit margin, as of the 2024 election. Compared to 2000, Bush improved upon his performance by 9.59%, the third-largest swing towards Bush in the country after only Tennessee and Alabama. Bush's strong performance in the state has been explained by the relatively high troop count (10,000) from Hawaii deployed to either Iraq, or Afghanistan.

== Caucuses ==
- 2004 Hawaii Democratic caucuses

== Campaign ==
=== Predictions ===
There were 12 news organizations who made state-by-state predictions of the election. Here are their last predictions before election day.

Source	Ranking
D.C. Political Report	Solid D
Associated Press	Solid D
CNN	Likely D
Cook Political Report	Solid D
Newsweek	Solid D
New York Times	Solid D
Rasmussen Reports	Likely D
Research 2000	Solid D
Washington Post	Likely D
Washington Times	Solid D
Zogby International	Likely D
Washington Dispatch	Likely D

=== Polling ===
Only 4 pre-election polls were taken in the state in the entire 2004 election. Kerry won the first two, which were taken before October, and Bush won the other 2 which were taken in the final month of October. The final RCP average gave Bush leading with a margin of 0.9%. The final 3 polls averaged Kerry leading 48% to 43%.

=== Fundraising ===
Bush raised $906,799. Kerry raised $279,877.

=== Advertising and visits ===
Neither campaign spent advertising money during the fall campaign. However, with polls showing the race tightening, Vice President Cheney appeared at a campaign rally for the Republican ticket in Honolulu on October 31, 2004.

== Analysis ==
Bush and Cheney did campaign here early on, but not throughout the entire campaign. Hawaii is considered too much of a Democratic stronghold to be a swing state. Hawaii is represented by two Democratic senators and representatives, and there has never been any competition in a senatorial election. Despite Bush's loss in the state, he improved upon his performance in the state from 2000. More importantly, he had the strongest showing for a Republican presidential candidate in the state since Ronald Reagan in 1984, doing a little better than his father did in 1988. This is the last time Hawaii was decided by a single digit margin, and where the Democratic nominee won fewer than 60% of the vote in Hawaii. Bush's strongest local performance was in Honolulu County (Oahu) where he trailed Kerry by slightly more than 2% of the vote.

== Results ==
2004 United States presidential election in Hawaii
Party	Candidate	Votes	Percentage	Electoral votes
Democratic	John Kerry	231,708	54.01%	4
Republican	George W. Bush (Inc.)	194,191	45.26%	0
Green	David Cobb	1,737	0.40%	0
Libertarian	Michael Badnarik	1,377	0.32%	0

=== By county ===
County	John Kerry Democratic		George W. Bush Republican		Various candidates Other parties		Margin		Total votes cast
County	#	%	#	%	#	%	#	%	Total votes cast
Hawaii	35,116	60.86%	22,032	38.18%	554	0.96%	13,084	22.68%	57,702
Honolulu	152,500	51.08%	144,157	48.29%	1,890	0.63%	8,343	2.79%	298,547
Kalawao	26	65.00%	14	35.00%	0	0.00%	12	30.00%	45
Kauaʻi	14,916	59.96%	9,740	39.15%	220	0.89%	5,176	20.81%	24,876
Maui	28,803	60.73%	18,187	38.34%	440	0.92%	10,616	22.39%	47,430
Totals	231,708	54.01%	194,191	45.26%	3,114	0.73%	37,517	8.75%	429,013

=== By congressional district ===
Kerry won both congressional districts.

District	Bush	Kerry	Representative
1st	47%	52%	Neil Abercrombie
2nd	44%	56%	Ed Case

== Electors ==
Technically the voters of Hawaii cast their ballots for electors: representatives to the Electoral College. Hawaii is allocated 4 electors because it has 2 congressional districts and 2 senators. All candidates who appear on the ballot or qualify to receive write-in votes must submit a list of 4 electors, who pledge to vote for their candidate and his or her running mate. Whoever wins the majority of votes in the state is awarded all 4 electoral votes. Their chosen electors then vote for president and vice president. Although electors are pledged to their candidate and running mate, they are not obligated to vote for them. An elector who votes for someone other than his or her candidate is known as a faithless elector.

The electors of each state and the District of Columbia met on December 13, 2004, to cast their votes for president and vice president. The Electoral College itself never meets as one body. Instead the electors from each state and the District of Columbia met in their respective capitols.

The following were the members of the Electoral College from Hawaii. All were pledged to and voted for John Kerry and John Edwards:

1. Frances Kagawa
2. Joy Kobashigawa Lewis
3. Samuel Mitchell
4. Dolly Strazar
