= Ecolo Japan =

Political think tank

Ecolo Japan is a political think tank/Institute, which aims to expand Green politics all over the country. It mainly consists of Japanese young ecologists who have interest in international environmental issues. Their philosophy is to realize a "sustainable society" in the country, by making policies respecting ecology, social justice, non-violence, self-determination and participatory democracy.

== History ==
It was founded January 2004 by Shuji Imamoto, a Green researcher/activist in Japan. Ecolo Japan has 660 members (July 2011), consists of scholars and specialists, who are mostly young members from their 20s to 40s. They usually hold regular seminars and workshops on Green politics for several years, publishing translated books and materials on Green politics, focusing on Europe.

From the year 2004 to 2009, Ecolo Japan promoted so called "5-years-Project" to establish the basis of a Green Party Movement in Japan, and was already successful in networking with all leading environmental NGOs in the country. They later tried to network with NGOs for human rights, international cooperation and sustainable development.

Since 2004, they keep contact with European Green Party, inviting its delegates to Japan. They attended Global Greens 2008 in Brazil, where they were officially admitted full-membership of Asia Pacific Greens Network (APGN), the regional branch of Global Greens Federation.

In 2009, one of their executive members stood for national election of Lower House (MP) but was defeated. In 2010, Shuji Imamoto, the leader (chairperson) was elected as one of the Committee members of APGN during the 2nd APGN conference in Taipei (April 30 - May 2). In February and March 2011, Ecolo Japan organised "Green-Hearts Campaign" to support five Green candidates running for local assembly elections in the capital areas and two of them were elected. They claimed that people should realize a non-nuclear, "100 percent" renewable energy-shifted society in Japan to the public. In June 2011, Ecolo founded an International Sector (Ecolo Japan International) to contribute to political advocacies for international conferences on environment.

In September 2011, Ecolo Japan dissolved in order to rearrange the organization as a new international political think tank or lobbyist group.
