= Shunji =

Shunji (written: 俊二, 俊治, 俊嗣, 舜二 or 隼士) is a masculine Japanese given name. Notable people with the name include

- Shunji Dodo (百々 俊二; born 1947), Japanese photographer
- Shunji Enomoto (榎本 俊二; born 1968), Japanese manga artist
- Shunji Fujimura (藤村 俊二; 1934–2017), Japanese actor
- Shunji Igarashi (五十嵐 隼士; born 1986), Japanese actor
- Shunji Isaki (伊崎 俊二; 1892–1943), Imperial Japanese Navy admiral
- Shunji Iwai (岩井 俊二; born 1963), Japanese film director, video artist, writer and documentarian
- Shunji Izutsu (井筒 俊司; born 1964), Japanese former military officer
- Shunji Karube (苅部 俊二; born 1969), Japanese hurdler and sprinter
- Shunji Kasuya (粕谷 俊二; born 1962), Japanese racing driver
- Shunji Kishi (貴志 俊治; born 1961), Japanese footballer and manager
- Shunji Kōno (河野 俊嗣; born 1964), Japanese politician
- Shunji Kosugi (小杉 俊二; born 1960), Japanese professional wrestler
- Shunji Masuda (増田 隼司; born 1998), Japanese footballer
- Shunji Miyao (宮尾 舜治; 1868–1937), Japanese government official, colonial administrator and politician
- Shunji Murai (奥本 隼士; born 1939), Japanese rower
- Shunji Nakadome (中留 俊司; born 1964), Japanese wrestler
- Shunji Okumoto (奥本 隼士; born 1999), Japanese racing driver
- Shunji Ōkura (大倉 舜二; born 1937), Japanese photographer
- Shunji Sato (佐藤 俊二; 1896–1977), Japanese general and physician
- Shunji Shimizu (清水 俊二; 1906–1988), Japanese subtitler and translator
- Shunji Takano (高野 俊二; born 1964), Japanese professional wrestler
- Shunji Yanai (柳井 俊二; born 1937), Japanese diplomat
- Shunji Watanabe (渡辺 俊二; born 1938), founder of Shorinjiryu Kenyukai Watanabe
- Shunji Yatsushiro (八代 俊二; born 1960), Japanese motorcycle racer

== Fictional characters ==
- Kimura Shunji, a character in the South Korean television series Bridal Mask
