= Kish (surname) =

Kish is a surname. Notable people with the surname include:

- Ben Kish (1917–1989), American National Football League player
- Daniel Kish (born 1966), American president of World Access for the Blind
- Eleanor Kish (1924–2014), American artist
- George Kish (1914–1989), American cartographer
- Jen Kish (born 1988), Canadian former rugby union player
- Joseph Kish (1899–1969), American set decorator
- Justine Kish (Svetlana Nasibulina, born 1988), American mixed martial artist
- Kristen Kish (born 1983), Korean-born American chef, winner of the tenth season of Top Chef, and television host
- Larry Kish (1941–2025), Canadian-born American National Hockey League head coach
- Laszlo B. Kish (born 1955), Hungarian-born American physicist
- Leslie Kish (1910–2000), Hungarian-American statistician and survey methodologist
- Nehemiah Kish (born c. 1980), American retired ballet dancer
