= Kenneth C. Martis =

American geographer

- Born: December 1945 (age 80); Toledo, Ohio

Kenneth Charles Martis (born December 1945) is an American political geographer notable for his mapping and documentation of the electoral history of the United States. He is a Professor Emeritus in the Department of Geology and Geography at West Virginia University.

== Early life and education ==
Martis was born in Toledo, Ohio in December 1945. His four grandparents and father were immigrants from the Slovakia region of Austria-Hungary. Martis obtained a B.Ed. degree from The University of Toledo in 1968 and a M.A. in geography from San Diego State College (later San Diego State University) in 1970. He then served two years as a United States Army Military Police Officer assigned to the 5th Special Forces Group, Fort Bragg, North Carolina, serving as Assistant Provost Marshal, John F. Kennedy Center for Military Assistance. After military service he entered the doctoral program in the Department of Geography at The University of Michigan. In 1975 he joined the faculty of West Virginia University and the next year received his Ph.D. in geography from the University of Michigan, studying under political geographer George Kish.

== Contributions to Political Geography ==
Martis is the author or co-author of ten award-winning books on the United States Congress and American politics. The first book in his series of historical political atlases, The Historical Atlas of United States Congressional Districts: 1789-1983, was designated a Selected Reference Book by the journal College and Research Libraries and won the American Historical Association's Waldo G. Leland Prize for the best reference book in all fields of history for the period 1981-1986. This work is the first to map every congressional district and analyze every apportionment change for every state for all of United States history. Based on the archival work for this book, Martis and Ruth A. Rowles were awarded the 1984 Organization of American Historian's Charles Thomson Prize for their article "Mapping Congress: Developing a Geographic Understanding of American Political History."

Congressional Districts of the Thirty-Seventh Congress, 1861-1863

The Thirty-seventh Congress illustration is an example of the congressional district boundary maps found in The Historical Atlas of United States Congressional Districts: 1789-1983. In the atlas there are ninety-seven national scale district maps, one for each of the first ninety-seven House of Representatives. The Thirty-seventh House (1861-1863) was primarily elected in 1860 and is the first House to convene during the Civil War. The striped areas designate districts in the eleven seceded states which did not send representatives to the United States Congress. However, the House did certify and seat ten "Unionist" members from three seceded states, five from Virginia, three from western Tennessee and two from southern Louisiana (elected after the New Orleans area was occupied). On the page opposite of each map is an alphabetical list of all who served in the House with their state and congressional district number or designation (note in the Thirty-seventh House illustration two members from Minnesota and three from California were not elected from districts but on a General Ticket, that is, statewide). Insert maps are used to illustrate very small districts in densely populated urban areas. Information is found at the bottom of each map giving the session dates, total number of representatives, Speaker, newly admitted states, and map notes indicating vacancies throughout the Congress and any significant state or national boundary changes.

In 1989 the second book in his series of political atlases was published, The Historical Atlas of Political Parties in the United States Congress: 1789-1989. The atlas was the first in American history to map all congressional elections for every state and district and identify the political party affiliation of every person elected to Congress from 1788. The Library Journal designated the political party atlas as one of the Best Reference Books of 1989 and College and Research Libraries named it a Selected Reference Book of 1989-90. The Library of Congress selected the political cartography from this work as the centerpiece of its main exhibition "Tides of Party Politics: Two Centuries of Congressional Elections" celebrating of the 1989 bicentennial of the United States Congress. The data developed for this work is now considered the standard source of political party affiliation of members of Congress by the official Biographical Directory of the United States Congress. In 2013 an article in Real Clear Politics selected the political party atlas as one of the 15 most influential/indispensable books on the subject of American election analysis (ranked #10). In 2023, the American Association of Geographers published a Member Profile telling the story of the genesis of examining the political geography of Congress. Also in 2023, Humanities magazine published the article "Red Map, Blue Map" discussing the origin and compilation of the district and party atlases. Both reference books have been used as a legal "Authority" including cases before the United States Supreme Court.

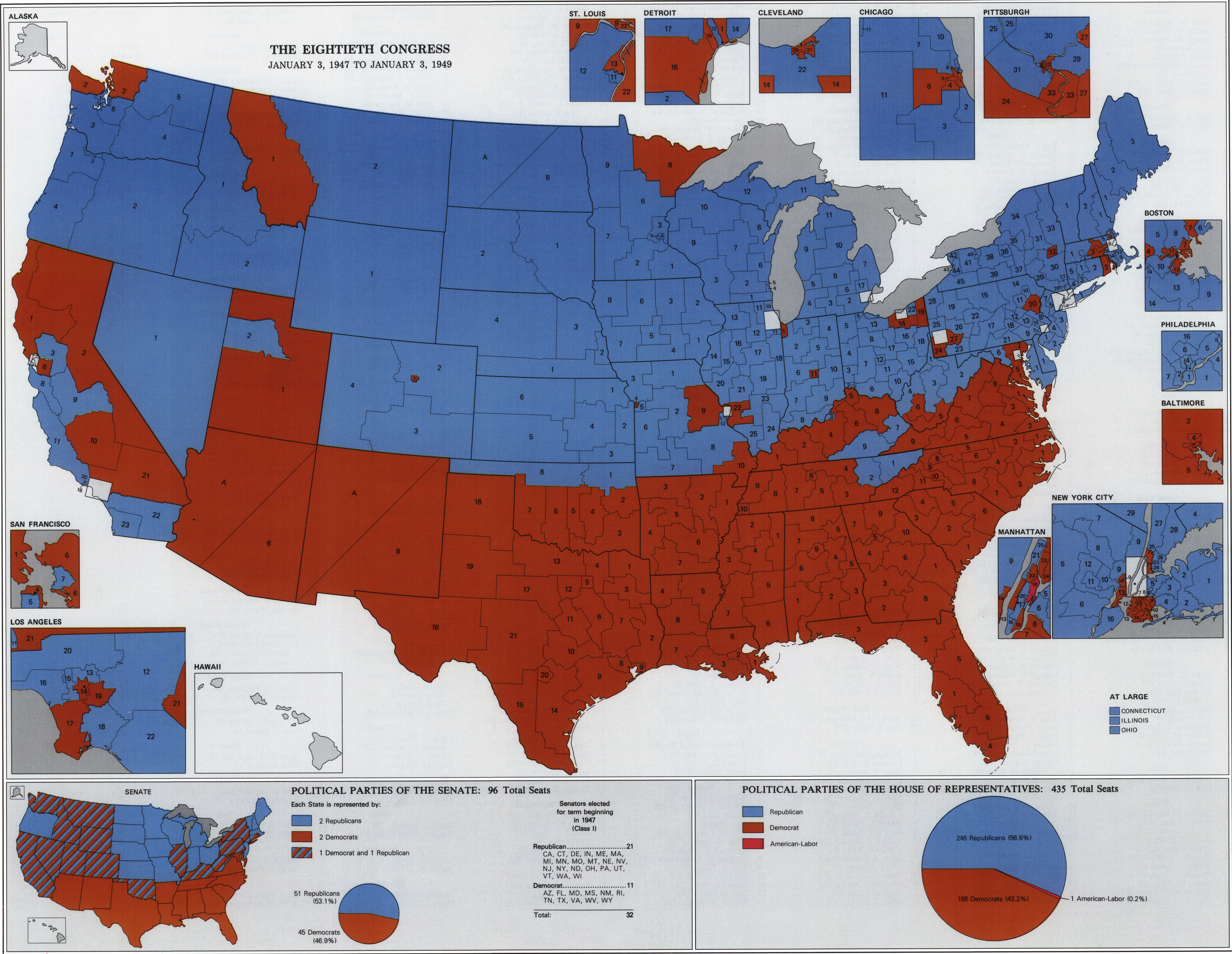
Political Parties of the Eightieth Congress (1947-1949)

The Eightieth Congress illustration is an example of the election maps found in The Historical Atlas of Political Parties in the United States Congress: 1789-1989. In the atlas there are one hundred large national four-color district election maps for the House of Representatives, and one hundred smaller state election maps for the Senate, for each of the first one hundred congresses. The maps are based upon the results tabulated on the regular Election Day. The Eightieth Congress (1947-1949) was a midterm election, with voting taking place on November 5, 1946 (Maine September 9, 1946). On the large House map blue indicates districts electing a Republican and red designates districts electing a Democrat. Insert maps are used to illustrate the results in very small districts in densely populated urban areas. The atlas identifies and maps all third party members elected to Congress in American history. In the Eightieth House one third party representative was elected, an American Labor Party candidate from the 18th District of New York. The percentage pie chart on the lower right gives a visual view and specific numbers for the partisan divide in each House. The map and pie chart on the lower left show the geographical pattern and partisan make-up of the Senate. The blue states have two Republican senators, red states two Democrats, and striped states one each. On the page opposite of the map page is a state by state list of all who served in the House and Senate, including replacements by special election or appointment, with their proper state and congressional district number and party affiliation (note in the Eightieth House illustration two representatives from both Arizona and New Mexico were not elected from districts but on a General Ticket, that is, statewide). The atlas facilitates comparisons with the previous Seventy-ninth Congress, and subsequent Eighty-first Congress, and all other congresses, in both geographic pattern and partisan divide. The geographical pattern shown for the Eightieth Congress is a classic post-Civil War regional division of the solid Democratic South and solid Republican North, with some Democrats elected from large urban areas.

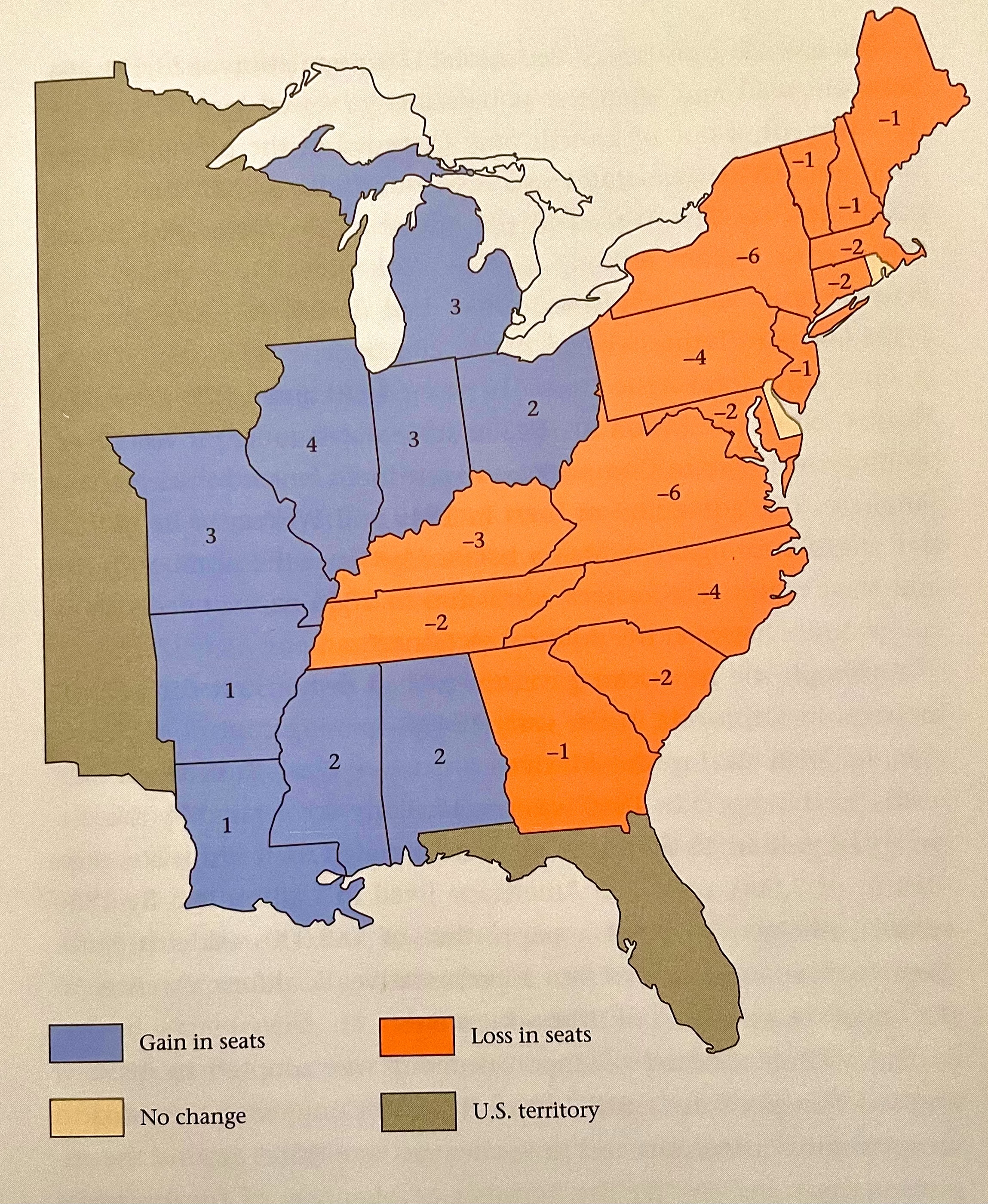
Reapportionment after the 1840 Census

In 1993, The Historical Atlas of State Power in Congress: 1790-1990 was published with co-author Gregory A. Elmes. The Atlas maps for the first time every apportionment change for every census for every state for all of United States history. The Atlas won the 1993 Washington Book Publishers award for best book design. The data and maps revealed four major geographical/population trends of congressional apportionment: Original and New States: 1790-1850; Free and Slave States: 1790-1860; Rural and Urban Places: 1870-1930; and Sunbelt and Snowbelt: 1970-1990.

The 1840 apportionment map is an example of the maps found in The Historical Atlas of State Power in Congress: 1790-1990. The Atlas has numerous data tables, maps for every census apportionment from 1790-1990, and discusses the history and changing formulas of the apportionment process. In 1840, the original eastern Atlantic coastal states lost congressional representation, while the newer western Trans-Appalachian states gained representation. The 1840 apportionment set the House of Representatives size at 223 members, 17 less seats than the 1830 apportionment. This partly accounts for the discrepancy in number of seats lost in the East and gained in the developing frontier West.

In 1994 The Historical Atlas of the Congresses of the Confederate States of America: 1861-1865 was published. This book is the first nonmilitary nonbattlefield atlas of the American Civil War. The American Library Association, Choice Magazine, designated this work an Outstanding Academic Book of 1994.

District Occupation Status – First Confederate Congress Fourth Session

During the American Civil War the Confederate Constitution set up a government with a president and a legislature, which was composed of a Senate and House of Representatives. The Confederate congressional atlas maps the districts, characteristics, elections and roll call voting behavior of this institution. The illustration shows the Union occupation status of the 106 districts of the Confederate House of Representatives in late 1863 and early 1864. Note the Confederacy admitted the slave states of Missouri and Kentucky, and they had full voting rights in the Confederate Congress, in spite of being Union controlled virtually from the beginning of the war, and in spite of their continued representation in the United States Congress. At the end of the First Confederate Congress only a little over a half of the House districts (52.8%) were unoccupied. The Union occupied areas mostly supported the increasingly stringent legislative proposals of Confederate President Jefferson Davis with respect to measures like conscription, impressment and habeas corpus. In other words, Confederate congressmen from occupied districts tended to support increasing conscription knowing men from their areas would not be subject, but many representatives from unoccupied districts tended to vote no, knowing men from their areas would bear the brunt of being drafted.

In 2002 the Atlas of American Politics: 1960-2000, was published, which Martis co-authored with J. Clark Archer, Stephen J. Lavin, and Fred M. Shelley. This atlas won the American Library Association Outstanding Academic Book Award of 2003. In 2006 he co-authored the Atlas of U.S. Presidential Elections: 1788-2004 with the same collaborators; it was the first county four-color atlas of all American presidential elections. In 2006 the Atlas was awarded the Library Journal Best Reference Book prize and the Association of American Publishers Outstanding Single Volume Reference Book in the Humanities & Social Sciences recognition. His most recent four books are co-edited works, Atlas of the 2012 Elections, Atlas of the 2016 Elections, Atlas of the 2020 Elections, and Atlas of the 2024 Elections. These atlases cover a myriad of geographical aspects of the fall 2012, 2016, 2020, and 2024 elections on the national, regional, state and county level, and each contain nearly 200 maps, graphs and illustrations. The 2020 Atlas was selected by the Book Authority as one of the "20 Best New Political History eBooks of 2023."

For his work on the historical geography of Congress and American politics he has received support from the National Endowment for the Humanities, National Science Foundation, American Association of Geographers, Everett McKinley Dirksen Congressional Leadership Research Center, Huntington Library, and the Newberry Library.

In 1987 he was a Fulbright Scholar in Perugia, Italy studying the Italian electoral system at the Universitá per Stranieri. In 2001 he was interviewed for the distinguished "Geographers on Film" series that highlights the career and work of notable American geographers. Kenneth C. Martis is a Professor Emeritus of Geography at West Virginia University and is the first social science awardee of that institution's highest academic honor, Benedum Distinguished Scholar. He was awarded the 2007 US/West Virginia Professor of the Year Award by the Carnegie Foundation for the Advancement of Teaching and the Council for Advancement and Support of Education (CASE), Washington, DC. The American Association of Geographers describes his lifelong work as having "fundamentally shaped our awareness of political patterns in the United States."

== Selected works ==
Books

- The Historical Atlas of United States Congressional Districts: 1789-1983. New York: The Free Press, 1982. (with Ruth A. Rowles - Cartographer).
- The Historical Atlas of Political Parties in the United States Congress: 1789-1989. New York: Macmillan, 1989. (with Ruth A. Rowles and Gyula Pauer – Cartographers).
- The Historical Atlas of State Power in Congress: 1790-1990. Washington, DC: Congressional Quarterly Press, 1993. (with Gregory A. Elmes).
- The Historical Atlas of the Congresses of the Confederate States of America: 1861-1865. New York: Simon and Schuster, 1994. (with Gyula Pauer - Cartographer and R. Reed Durbin - Research Assistant).
- Atlas of American Politics: 1960-2000. Washington, DC: Congressional Quarterly Press, 2002. (with J. Clark Archer, Stephen J. Lavin, Fred M. Shelley)
- Historical Atlas of U. S. Presidential Elections: 1788-2004. Washington, DC: Congressional Quarterly Press, 2006. (with J. Clark Archer, Stephen J. Lavin, Fred M. Shelley).
- Atlas of the 2012 Elections, eds. Lanham, Maryland: Rowman & Littlefield, 2014. (with J. Clark Archer, Robert H. Watrel, Fiona M. Davidson, Erin H. Fouberg, Richard L. Morrill, Fred M. Shelley, and Gerald R. Webster).
- Atlas of the 2016 Elections, eds. Lanham, Maryland: Rowman & Littlefield, 2018. (with J. Clark Archer, Robert H. Watrel, Fiona M. Davidson, Erin H. Fouberg, John J. Heppen, Richard L. Morrill, Fred M. Shelley, and Ryan D. Weichelt).
- Atlas of the 2020 Elections, eds. Lanham, Maryland: Rowman & Littlefield, 2022. (with Robert H. Watrel, Kimberly Johnson Maier, Ryan Weichelt, Fiona M. Davidson, John Heppen, Erin H. Fouberg, J. Clark Archer, Richard L. Morrill, and Fred M. Shelley).
- Atlas of the 2024 Elections, eds. New York: Bloomsbury, 2026. (with Robert H. Watrel, Kimberly Johnson Maier, Ryan Weichelt, John Heppen, J. Clark Archer, and Ezra Zeitler).

Articles

- "Mapping Congress: Developing a Geographic Understanding of American Political History." Prologue: The Journal of the National Archives. Vol. 16, No. 1, Spring 1984, 4-21. (with Ruth A. Rowles).
- Martis, Kenneth C. (April 1988). "Sectionalism and the United States Congress". Political Geography Quarterly. 7 (2): 99–109. doi:10.1016/0260-9827(88)90022-5.
- Martis, Kenneth C.; Kovacs, Zoltan; Kovacs, Dezso; Peter, Sandor (May 1992). "The geography of the 1990 Hungarian parliamentary elections". Political Geography. 11 (3): 283–305. doi:10.1016/0962-6298(92)90030-W.
- North America: The Historical Geography of a Changing Continent. Thomas F. McIlwraith and Edward K. Muller, eds. (Totowa, New Jersey: Rowman & Littlefield, 2001), Chapter Seven "The Geographical Dimensions of a New Nation, 1780s-1820s," 143-164.
- Martis, Kenneth C. (March 2005). "Representation of Appalachia in North American Geography College Textbooks". Journal of Geography. 104 (2): 85–92. Bibcode:2005JGeog.104...85M. doi:10.1080/00221340508978620.
- "Geographical Patterns of Reapportionment, 1790-2000," Guide to U.S. Elections. Washington, DC: Congressional Quarterly Press, 2005. 863-864.
- Martis, Kenneth C. (November 2008). "The original gerrymander". Political Geography. 27 (8): 833–839. doi:10.1016/j.polgeo.2008.09.003.
- Atlas of the 2008 Elections. Stanley D. Brunn, ed. (Lanham, Maryland: Rowman & Littlefield, 2011), Chapter Nine "Post 2008 Congressional Votes," 277-291.
- "Reapportionment, Regional Politics and Partisan Gain." Extensions: A Journal of the Carl Albert Congressional Research and Studies Center. Winter 2015, 18-21. (with J. Clark Archer, Robert H. Watrel, Fred M. Shelley, and Gerald R. Webster).
- "Regional Realignments: Appalachia and the Upper South," in "Spatial and Political Realignment of the U.S. Electorate, 1988-2012." Gerald R. Webster and Richard L. Morrill. Political Geography, Vol. 48, 2015, 93-107.
- "Electoral Map." Mark Monmonier, ed. The History of Cartography, Volume Six: Cartography in the Twentieth Century. Chicago: University of Chicago Press, 2015, 349-55.
- Archer, J. Clark; Brunn, Stanley D.; Martis, Kenneth C.; Webster, Gerald R. (August 2024). "United States Senate malapportionment: A geographical investigation". Political Geography. 113 103129. doi:10.1016/j.polgeo.2024.103129.
- "The Reapportionment of Votes in the Electoral College: The 1970s to Now." University of Virginia, Center for Politics, Sabato's Crystal Ball, January 23, 2025. (with J. Clark Archer and Frank LaFone – Compilation Cartographers).
- "Electoral Map." Roger Kain, ed. The History of Cartography, Volume Five: Cartography in the Nineteenth Century. Chicago: University of Chicago Press, forthcoming.

Databases

- Database of Historical Congressional Statistics. Blacksburg, Virginia: Virginia Polytechnic Institute and State University, Department of Political Science, 2001. http://www.icpsr.umich.edu/icpsrweb/ICPSR/studies/03371. Elaine K. Swift, Robert G. Brookshire, David T. Canon, Evelyn C. Fink, John R. Hibbing, Brian D. Humes, Michael J. Malbin and Kenneth C. Martis.
- Digital Boundary Definitions of United States Congressional Districts, 1789-2012. Los Angeles, California: University of California Los Angeles, Department of Political Science, 2013. http://cdmaps.polisci.ucla.edu. Jeffrey B. Lewis, Brandon DeVine, Lincoln Pitcher, and Kenneth C. Martis.

Library Exhibitions

- "Tides of Party Politics: Two Centuries of Congressional Elections 1789-1989," Museum exhibition, February–August, 1989, Library of Congress, Madison Building, Washington, DC (with John R. Sellers and Ingrid M. Maar, with introduction by Cokie Roberts).
- “Cartography of Congress: A Geographic History of Political Parties.” April-December 2026, West Virginia University Library, John D. Rockefeller IV Gallery, Morgantown, WV. (with Catherine Melillo and Danielle Emerling, with introduction by Raymond W. Smock).

Legal

- Jefferson County Commission v. Tennant. Expert witness in federal court on congressional redistricting December 2011, Charleston, WV (Case No. 2:11-cv-0989).

Dissertation

- "The History of Natural Resources Roll-Call Voting in the United States House of Representatives: An Analysis of the Spatial Aspects of Legislative Voting Behavior." Ph.D. Dissertation, Department of Geography, The University of Michigan, 1976.
