= Kesh =

Kesh may refer to:

== Places ==
- Keş, Azerbaijan
- Kesh, County Fermanagh, Northern Ireland
  - Kesh railway station, 1866–1957
- Kesh (Sumer), an ancient Sumerian city and religious site
- Kesh, historic name of Shahrisabz, Uzbekistan

== Other uses ==
- Kesh (Sikhism), a practice of not cutting hair
- Albanian Power Corporation (Albanian: Korporata Elektroenergjitike Shqiptare, KESH), an electricity supplier
- Kesh, a fictional human culture and language in Ursula K. Le Guin's novel Always Coming Home
- The Empire of Great Kesh, a nation of the world of Midkemia, in books written by Raymond Feist

== See also ==
- Kish (disambiguation)
- Lil Kesh (Keshinro Ololade, born 1995), Nigerian singer and rapper
- RAF Long Kesh, a former Royal Air Force station in Northern Ireland
  - HM Prison Maze, previously Long Kesh Detention Centre
- KESHHHHHH Recordings, a record label of British musician Simon Scott
