= 2004 Hawaii Democratic presidential caucuses =

- February 24, 2004

20 pledged delegates to the 2004 Democratic National Convention
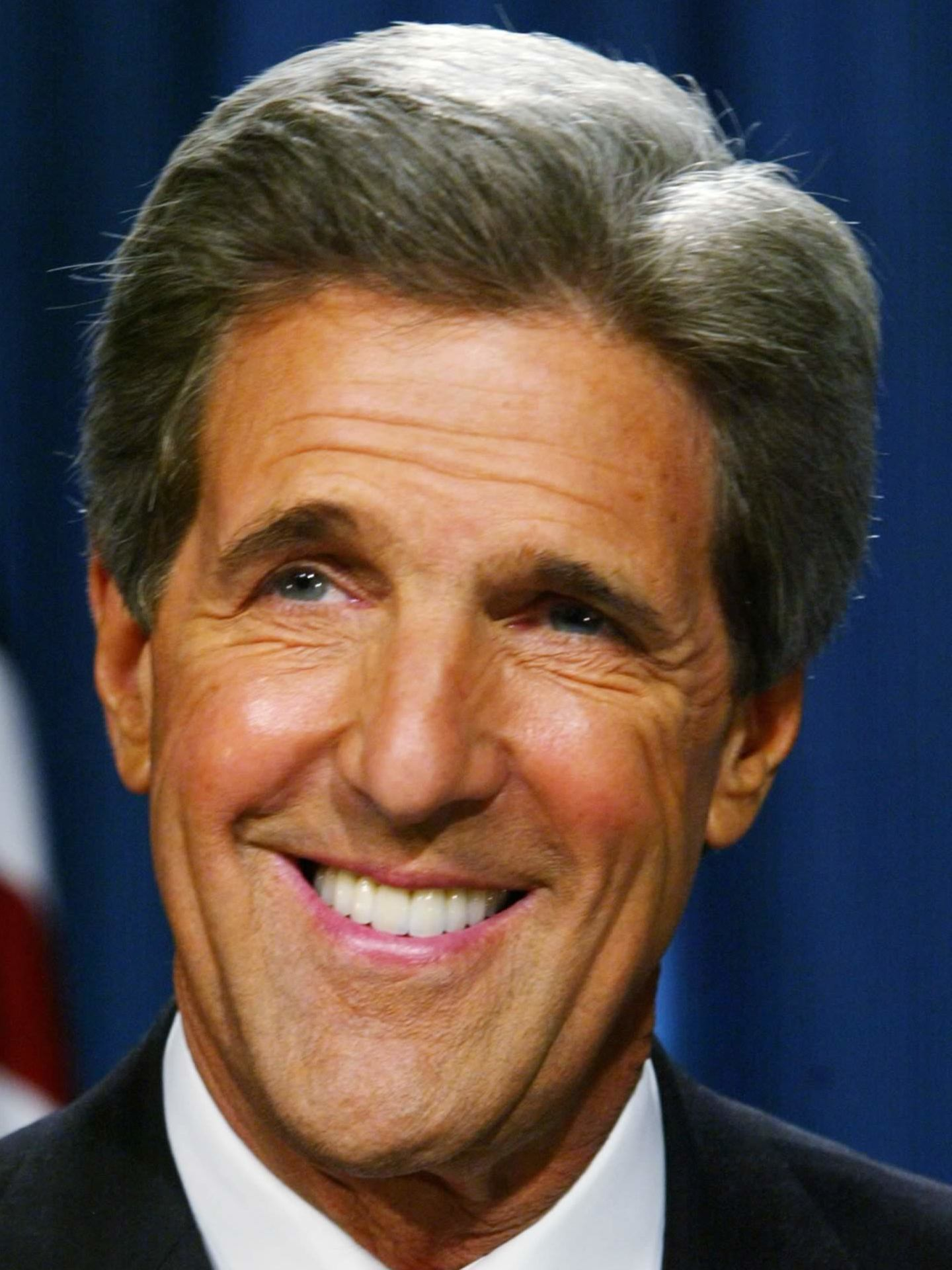

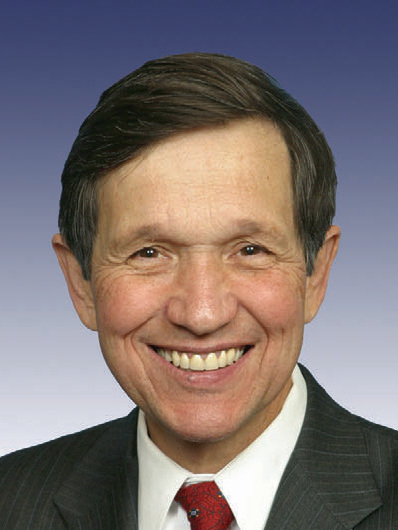

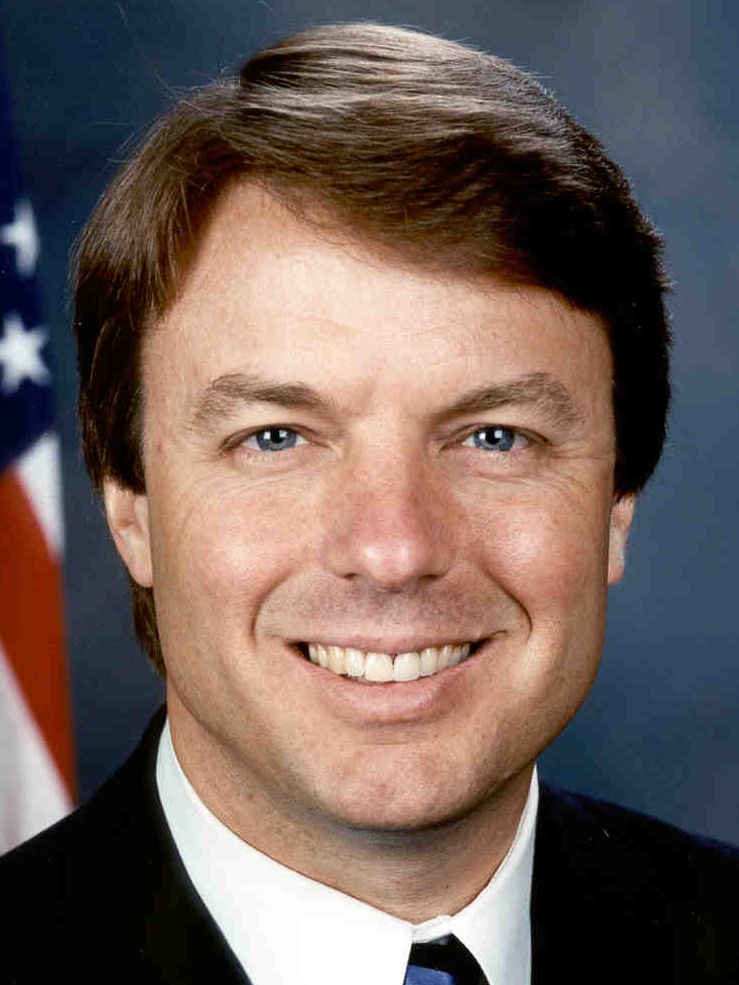

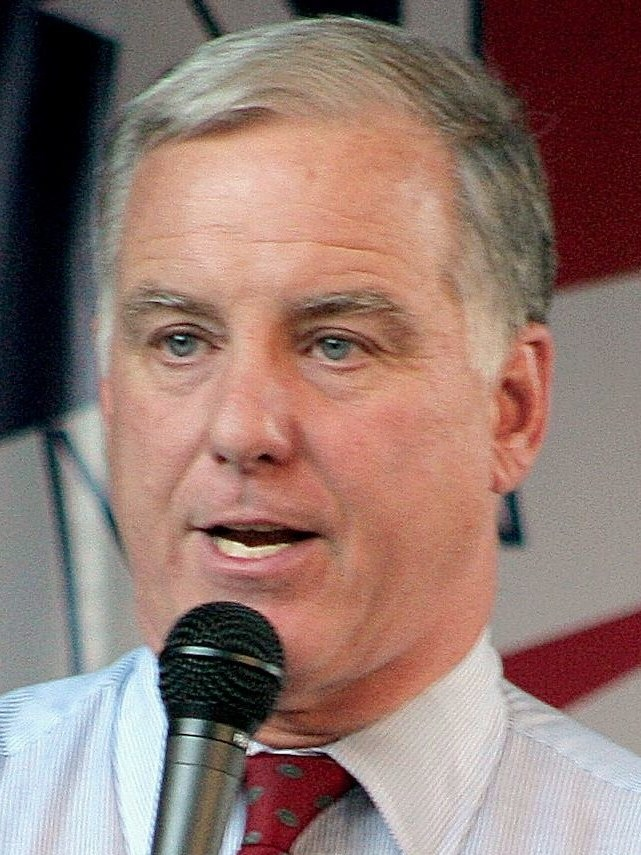
Candidate	John Kerry	Dennis Kucinich
Home state	Massachusetts	Ohio
Delegate count	12	8
Popular vote	1,921	1,273
Percentage	47.08%	31.20%
Candidate	John Edwards	Howard Dean (withdrawn)
Home state	North Carolina	Vermont
Delegate count	0	0
Popular vote	512	297
Percentage	12.55%	7.28%

The 2004 Hawaii Democratic presidential caucuses were held on February 24 in the U.S. state of Hawaii as one of the Democratic Party's statewide nomination contests ahead of the 2004 presidential election.

== Results ==
2004 Hawaii Democratic presidential caucuses
Candidate	Votes	%	Delegates
John Kerry	1,921	47.08	12
Dennis Kucinich	1,273	31.20	8
John Edwards	512	12.55	0
Howard Dean (withdrawn)	297	7.28	0
Uncommitted	44	1.08	0
Wesley Clark (withdrawn)	22	0.54	0
Write-ins	7	0.17	0
Joe Lieberman (withdrawn)	4	0.10	0
Total	4,080	100%	20
