= Shuji Imamoto =

Japanese environmentalist

Shuji Imamoto (今本 秀爾, Imamoto Shūji) is a Japanese ecological "green" activist and journalist. He has represented the green political movement in Japan since his attendance in Global Greens Conference in Canberra in 2001. As a researcher, his major field is modern European political and social philosophy such as Critical Theory of the Frankfurt School (Habermas, Erich Fromm), Critical Rationalism (Karl Popper), political pluralism (Hannah Arendt), political liberalism and existentialism (Jaspers, Sartre).

== Early life and career ==
He majored in German Studies. Then he got doctor's degrees of European philosophy and continued to study at the graduate course of Tokyo University (social and interdisciplinary studies).

After graduation, he published papers and reports on socio-philosophical issues, for example "On metaphysical liberalism", then presented at various international conferences and lectured at many universities in Europe and USA.

In 1998, he founded a group “Political Forum on the Internet” (PFI Japan) and gathered activists to act for Participatory Democracy System (Referendum and Initiative) in Japan. He has also participated in Worldwide Direct Democracy Movement (WDDM) since 2000.

In 2001, he published the book “Liberal Power --- Condition to overcome a badly-sickened society”.

== Career as green politician ==
He participated in Global Greens Conference 2001 in Australia, thereafter he got involved in Green movement worldwide. He then joined a lot of events and campaigns held by European Greens, interviewed them many times, and introduced them in eco-media of Japan, so that they should hope to found a Green party of Japan.

To realise the target, he founded a new Green think tank Ecolo Japan in 2004 with his small company at the beginning. Thereafter he planned and conducted many lectures, symposiums, seminars and campaigns in relation to Green politics around Tokyo, the capital area of Japan, from 2005 to 2011.

In 2005 and 2007, he translated political books and materials by German Greens into Japanese.

In 2008, he also attended the 2nd Global Greens Conference in Brazil 2008 as a Japanese delegate. There, Ecolo Japan was admitted as full-membership in Asia Pacific Greens Network (APGN), a regional branch of Global Greens Federation.

== Current activities ==
After retiring as an APGN committee member, he founded the ECOXIA Institute for Promoting Sustainable Society and Economy in 2012.
