= The Historical Atlas of Political Parties in the United States Congress: 1789–1989 =

The Historical Atlas of Political Parties in the United States Congress: 1789-1989
- The front of the first edition
- Author: Kenneth C. Martis
- Illustrator: Ruth A. Rowles and Gyula Pauer, cartographers
- Language: English
- Genre: Atlas/Reference
- Publisher: Macmillan
- Publication date: 1989
- Publication place: United States
- Pages: x, 518
- ISBN: 9780029201701
- OCLC: 18520389
- LC Class: G1201.F9 M26 1989
- Preceded by: The Historical Atlas of United States Congressional Districts: 1789-1983

The Historical Atlas of Political Parties in the United States Congress: 1789–1989 is a 518 page bound volume of maps of all United States congressional elections from the effective date of the U.S. Constitution through the 1986 election to the 100th Congress. It was authored by West Virginia University geography professor Kenneth C. Martis with cartography by Ruth A. Rowles and Gyula Pauer.

== Background ==
Representation in the United States Congress is geographically based. Moreover, the Founders explicitly designed the House of Representatives to be an institution that reflects local and regional concerns. These inescapable facts, and the actual history and actions of Congress itself, led many prominent historians, political scientists and geographers to attempt to investigate congressional elections, roll call voting, and other characteristics and behavior in their spatial context. Two of the greatest hindrances to this type of research were the unavailability of historical congressional district boundary maps and historical congressional election maps. To fill this gap in American historical information, the National Endowment for the Humanities, in the late 1970s and 1980s, supported research which became two of the most important and award-winning reference books in American political history. These books provided researchers, teachers and students with an additional critical dimension for examining and understanding the American experience.

== Content ==
Following the publication of The Historical Atlas of United States Congressional Districts: 1789-1983 in 1983, NEH supported research leading to publication of The Historical Atlas of Political Parties in the United States Congress: 1789-1989, published by Macmillan in 1989.

Using the congressional district boundary maps from the first atlas as the base maps, this work was the first book in American history to map the political party winner for all congressional elections for every state and district from 1789. This mapping required the first systematic research project in American history to identify from a wide variety of sources the political affiliation or party membership at the time of each election of every individual who ever served in the United States Congress. Some 11,175 individuals served in the Senate and House between 1789 and 1986. For the House of Representatives alone this encompasses 31,302 initial elections. This work is not only the first specifically to identify each member and election with respect to political party affiliation, but it also supplies all the reference sources used in the identification. The data developed for this work is now considered the definitive source of political party affiliation of members of Congress by the official ‘'Biographical Directory of the United States Congress’’. The maps and data in this atlas provide not only a complete electoral and political party representation history of every individual who served in Congress, but they also give a complete historical representation profile of every city, county, and state in the United States. The Library Journal designated the political party atlas as one of the "Best Reference Books of 1989" and College and Research Libraries named it a "Selected Reference Book of 1989-90." In 2013 an article in Real Clear Politics selected the political party atlas as one of the 15 most influential/indispensable books on the subject of American election analysis (ranked #10). In 2023, Humanities magazine published the article "Red Map, Blue Map" discussing the origin and compilation of the district and party atlases.

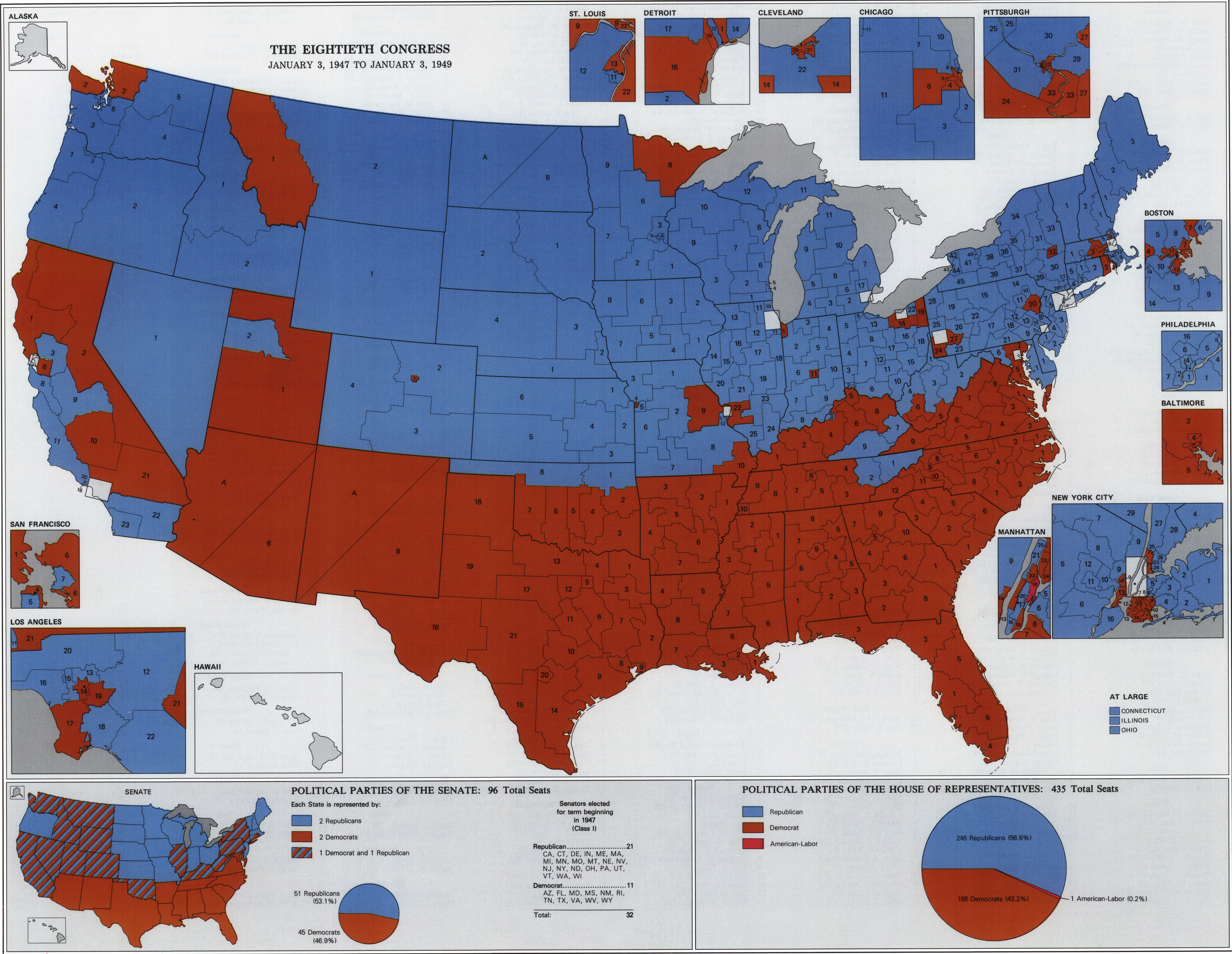
Political Parties of the Eightieth Congress (1947-1949)

The Eightieth Congress illustration is an example of the election maps found in The Historical Atlas of Political Parties in the United States Congress: 1789–1989. In the atlas there are one hundred large national four-color district election maps for the House of Representatives, and one hundred smaller state election maps for the Senate, for each of the first one hundred congresses. The maps are based upon the results tabulated on the regular Election Day. The Eightieth Congress (1947-1949) was a midterm election, with voting taking place on November 5, 1946 (Maine September 9, 1946). On the large House map blue indicates districts electing a Republican and red designates districts electing a Democrat. Insert maps are used to illustrate the results in very small districts in densely populated urban areas. The atlas identifies and maps all third party members elected to Congress in American history. In the Eightieth House one third party representative was elected, an American-Labor Party candidate from the 18th District of New York. The percentage pie chart on the lower right gives a visual view and specific numbers for the partisan divide in each House. The map and pie chart on the lower left show the geographical pattern and partisan make-up of the Senate. The blue states have two Republican senators, red states two Democrats, and striped states one each. On the page opposite of the map page is a state by state list of all who served in the House and Senate, including replacements by special election or appointment, with their proper state and congressional district number and party affiliation (note in the Eightieth House illustration two representatives from both Arizona and New Mexico were not elected from districts but on a General Ticket, that is, statewide). The atlas facilitates comparisons with the previous Seventy-ninth Congress, and subsequent Eighty-first Congress, and all other congresses, in both geographic pattern and partisan divide. The geographical pattern shown for the Eightieth Congress is a classic post-Civil War regional division of the solid Democratic South and solid Republican North, with some Democrats elected from large urban areas.

== Library of Congress Exhibition ==
The spring of 1989 marked the 200th Anniversary of the meeting of the First Session of the First Congress. For a number of years the Library of Congress sought an appropriate exhibition celebrating the Bicentennial of Congress. At the suggestion of United States Senate Historian, Richard A. Baker, and United States House of Representatives Historian, Raymond W. Smock, the Librarian of Congress and the House and Senate Bicentennial Commissions selected the election maps of ‘'The Historical Atlas of Political Parties in the United States Congress: 1789-1989’’ as the centerpiece of the exhibit. On February 8, 1989, this exhibit, "Tides of Party Politics: Two Centuries of Congressional Elections, 1789-1989" opened in the Madison Building of the Library of Congress and ran for six months. The exhibition was jointly curated by the Atlas author, Dr. Kenneth C. Martis of West Virginia University, along with Dr. John R. Sellers of the Library’s Manuscript Division, and Ingrid M. Maar of the Exhibits Office.

The Atlas is currently out-of-print, but can be found in most major university and public libraries. The copyright is held by the author. In the 1990s the Atlas political affiliation/party identifications were put into digital form in a data base produced by the Voteview project.
