= KES College =

College in Cyprus

- Motto: Semper Vigilans
- Type: Private
- Established: 1971
- Students: 600
- Location: Nicosia, Cyprus
- Website: http://www.kescollege.ac.cy

KES College (Greek: Κολλέγιο ΚΕΣ) is a college in Cyprus founded in 1971.
