= Kishi Station =

Kishi Station is the name of two train stations in Japan:

- Kishi Station (Osaka) (喜志駅) in Tondabayashi, Osaka Prefecture
- Kishi Station (Wakayama) (貴志駅) in Kinokawa, Wakayama Prefecture
