= Iranian yacht Kish =

History

Iran
- Name: Kish
- Namesake: Kish Island
- Builder: Burmester, West Germany
- Commissioned: 1970

History

Iran
- Operator: Islamic Republic of Iran Navy
- Reclassified: Turned into training ship
- Fate: Unknown

General characteristics (as built)
- Type: Yacht
- Displacement: 178 tons full load
- Length: 37.2 m (122 ft 1 in)
- Beam: 7.6 m (24 ft 11 in)
- Draft: 2.2 m (7 ft 3 in)
- Installed power: 2 × diesel engines, 2,920 brake horsepower (2.18 MW); 2 × shafts
- Speed: 20 knots (37 km/h)

Kish (Persian: کیش) was a royal yacht of the Shah of Iran named after Kish Island. It sailed in the Persian Gulf, in contrast to the bigger but older yacht Chahsevar that was in the Caspian Sea.

Kish was completed in 1970 by Yacht and Bootswerft, West Germany. After the Iranian Revolution, she was reportedly refitted in Bandar Abbas and then used as a training ship. Her fate is unknown although she may be a yacht abandoned on the Raritan River, New Jersey for many years (coordinates of its location 40.4845149, -74.3923997).

== Description ==
The yacht displaced up to 178 tonnes (175 long tons) at full load. Kish was 37.2 m (122 ft) long, had a beam of 7.6 m (25 ft) and a draft of 2.2 m (7 ft 3 in). She had a pair of MTU diesel engines that rotated two shaft with a nominal power of 2,920 brake horsepower (2.18 MW). The top speed of the vessel is recorded as 20 knots (37 km/h). She had a navigation radar working on I-band.
