= Keş =

- Location within Azerbaijan
- Coordinates: 40°55′24″N 49°13′48″E
- Country: Azerbaijan
- Rayon: Siazan
- Time zone: UTC+4 (AZT)
  - Summer (DST): UTC+5 (AZT)

Keş (also spelled Kesh) is a village in the Siazan Rayon of Azerbaijan.
