= George Kish =

American cartographer

- Born: György Kiss; November 24, 1914; Budapest, Austria-Hungary
- Died: July 11, 1989 (aged 74); Ann Arbor, Michigan, U.S.
- Occupation(s): Cartographic historian, geographer, professor

Professor George Kish (November 24, 1914 – July 11, 1989, born György Kiss) was an internationally recognized authority known for work in geography and the history of cartography. His professional papers are held at the Bentley Historical Library in Ann Arbor.

Kish was affiliated with the University of Michigan, Ann Arbor, for 46 years as a teacher and researcher. He came to the University in 1939 as a research assistant in geography and was appointed an instructor of geography in 1943. He was promoted to professor in 1956, and was named the William Herbert Hobbs distinguished Professor of Geography in 1981.

Kish was a Fulbright Research Professor in Italy in 1951–1952, and again in 1963. He lectured at the United Nations University in Cambridge, the Stockholm School of Economics, and the Academy of Sciences of both Poland and Hungary, and at universities in Rome, Florence, Naples, Bari, London, Oxford, and Liège. He was the curator of maps at the William L. Clements Library for several years.

Kish's many awards included the Andrée Plaque for Polar Studies from the Swedish Geographical Society, the Greater Linnaeus Silver Medal from the Royal Swedish Academy of Sciences, The University of Michigan's Henry Russel Lectureship and the Honors Award from the Association of American Geographers. In 1981, he received the Jornard Prize of the Paris Society of Geography, an honor awarded just once each decade. He also was a Commander in the Order of the Star of Italian Solidarity.

Kish was born in Budapest, Hungary to Dezso Kiss (Note: Also given as Denzso) and Ilona Vadnai on November 24, 1914. He was naturalized as a U.S. citizen in 1948. Kish received his Bachelor of Science degree in 1935 from the Ecole Libre des Sciences Politiques in Paris. He received his Master of Arts degree from the University of Paris (Sorbonne) in 1937, a Master of Science degree from the University of Budapest in 1938, and a Doctor of Science degree from the University of Budapest in 1939. He received his Ph.D. in geography from the University of Michigan in 1945. Kish died after a brief illness in Ann Arbor, Michigan, on July 11, 1989.

Kish published more than 140 articles in English, French, German, Italian, and Hungarian, as well as several books. He is author of the Bibliography of International Geographical Congresses, 1871–1976. His last book, La Carte: Image des Civilizations, was published in Paris in 1980.

Kish was married to a Canadian physician, Elvina Anger Kish, and is survived by his daughter, Susan Kish of Zurich, and her family.

== Publications ==
- History of Cartography, 200 35mm slides with descriptive booklet
- A Source Book in Geography, Harvard Press
- Economic Atlas of the Soviet Union
- North East Passage: Adolf Erik Nordenskiold, His Life and Times (1973)
- Heart of Asia: The Life of Sven Hedin by George Kish (1984)
- History of American Academic Cartography

== See also ==
- University of Michigan
