= Shunji Kishi =

Japanese footballer and manager

Personal information
- Full name: Shunji Kishi
- Date of birth: July 25, 1961 (age 65)
- Place of birth: Tokushima, Japan
- Height: 1.81 m (5 ft 11 1/2 in)
- Position: Defender

Senior career*
Years	Team	Apps	(Gls)
1980–1994	Cerezo Osaka		

Managerial career
- 2007: Cerezo Osaka
Medal record
Cerezo Osaka
Winner	Japan Soccer League	1980
Winner	JSL Cup	1983
Winner	JSL Cup	1984
Runner-up	JSL Cup	1982
Runner-up	Emperor's Cup	1983
Runner-up	Emperor's Cup	1994
- * Club domestic league appearances and goals

Shunji Kishi (貴志 俊治, Kishi Shunji; born July 25, 1961) is a former Japanese football player and manager.

== Playing career ==
Shunji Kishi played for Yanmar Diesel / Cerezo Osaka as defender from 1980 to 1994.

== Coaching career ==
Since 1995, Shunji Kishi became coach for Cerezo Osaka youth team. In May 2007, the Cerezo Osaka top team manager, Satoshi Tsunami, resigned his position. Shunji Kishi became top team coach and managed the club in the interim, until a new manager, Levir Culpi, was appointed.
