= K1 =

K1, K.I, K01, K 1 or K-1 can refer to:

== Geography ==
- K1, another name for Masherbrum, a mountain in the Karakoram range in Pakistan
- Kōnāhuanui 1, a mountain in Oahu, Hawaii
- K1, a small town to north of Kirkuk city, Iraq
- K1 (building), a high-rise building in Kraków, Poland

== Mathematics ==
- $K_1(R)$ denotes the first algebraic K-theory group of a ring $R$.

== Military ==
- Denel K1, a South African mortar
- Daewoo Precision Industries K1, a carbine of the South Korean army
- EMER K-1, a Burmese assault rifle designated EMERK
- Fokker K.I, a World War I German experimental aircraft
- Kucher Model K1, a Hungarian submachine gun
- HMS K1, a World War I British submarine
- HMS Acanthus (K01) / HNoMS Andenes (K01), a 1939 British, then Norwegian Flower-class corvette
- K1 tank, or Type 88 tank, a modern main battle tank of the South Korean military
- K-1 cart a United States Signal Corps cart for carrying signal equipment
- K 1, a designation for a Swedish cavalry regiment
- K1-class gunboat, planned World War II German gunboat
- K1, a World War II Dutch sloop operated by the German Navy
- Skoda K-1, of the Skoda K series, a World War II Czechoslovak howitzer
- USS K-1 (SS-32), a 1913 United States Navy K class of submarine
- K-1 Airfield, former name of the Gimhae Air Base
- Soviet submarine K-1
- IVL K.1 Kurki, a Finnish trainer aircraft

== Names ==
- An abbreviation of Keiichi Morisato, a character in the manga/anime Oh My Goddess!
- First name of Keiichi Maebara, a character in Higurashi When They Cry franchise
- K1, a nickname given to Kyler Murray (born 1997), American football quarterback
- kwn (born 2000), formerly known as k1, British singer and rapper

== Transportation ==
=== Road transport ===
- BMW K1, a sport bike
- K-1 Attack, a Slovak sports car
- K-1 (Kansas highway), a state highway in Kansas
- London Buses route K1, a Transport for London contracted bus route
- Tatra K1, a 1967 Czechoslovak experimental tramcar

=== Steam locomotives ===
- Furness Railway K1, a steam locomotive class related to the Furness Railway K2
- GSR Class K1, a Great Southern Railway Irish steam locomotive
- LNER Thompson/Peppercorn Class K1, a 1949 British 2-6-0 (mogul) steam locomotive class
- LNER Class K1, a class of British steam locomotives
- NCC Class K1, a Northern Counties Committee Irish steam locomotive
- PRR K1, a Pennsylvania Railroad locomotive classification
- SR K1 class, a British 2-6-0 steam locomotive
- the first 1909 Tasmanian Government Railways K class Garratt, a type of articulated steam locomotive

=== Water transport and sport ===
- K1 Britannia, the replica of His Majesty's Yacht Britannia built in 1893 for Commodore Albert Edward, Prince of Wales
- The class/racing number on HMY Britannia's main sail
- K1, (single kayak) a canoe racing event under the International Canoe Federation

=== Other vehicles ===
- K-1 (rocket), an aerospace vehicle under development by Rocketplane Kistler

== Electronics ==
- Kawai K1, a digital synthesizer
- Magnetophon K1, the first tape recorder, produced in Germany in 1935
- Motorola KRZR K1, a mobile phone
- Sendo K1, a model of Sendo mobile phone
- Pentax K-1, a digital single-lens reflex camera
- Pentax K-01, a digital mirrorless interchangeable lens camera
- Tegra K1, an Nvidia system on a chip for mobile devices

== United States government forms ==
- K-1 visa, a United States immigration visa (also called the fiancé(e) visa)
- Schedule K-1, a tax form of the United States Internal Revenue Service (IRS) corresponding with Form 1065 to report one's share of income in a flow-through entity

== Music ==
K. 1 can designate:

- six works by Wolfgang Amadeus Mozart:
  - K. 1a, an Andante in C for Keyboard
  - K. 1b, an Allegro in C for Keyboard
  - K. 1c, an Allegro in F for Keyboard
  - K. 1d, a Minuet in F for Keyboard
  - K. 1e, a Minuet in G for Keyboard
  - K. 1f, a Minuet in C for Keyboard
- Kk. 1 or K. 1, a sonata for keyboard by Scarlatti; see List of solo keyboard sonatas by Domenico Scarlatti
- Kay One (born 1984), German rapper
- Kingz One, a music group created in 2003
- K1, an album by Kmoe

== Miscellaneous ==
- Family K1, a set of New Testament manuscripts
- K1 or K-1, an abbreviation for kerosene heating fuel
- K1, a Larcum Kendall marine chronometer (1769)
- K-1, a kickboxing promotion
- Haplogroup LT or K1, a Y-chromosome DNA haplogroup
- K1, an alternative title for Kommune 1
- k1, a coefficient that encapsulates process-related factors, limiting the minimum feature size in photolithography
- K1 fund, a suspected German Ponzi-scheme
- an abbreviation for KotOR 1
- K_{1}, a common name for the vitamin phylloquinone

== See also ==
- Kerrang! ("K!"), UK music webzine
- Kahoot! ("K!"), Norwegian online quiz game learning platform
- KL (disambiguation)
- KI (disambiguation)
- 1K (disambiguation)
