= LK =

LK or lk may refer to:

== Businesses and organizations ==
- Air Luxor (IATA airline code LK)
- Latin Kings (gang)
- Luckin Coffee, a Chinese coffee house chain (former NASDAQ ticker symbol LK)

== Science and technology ==
- LK (spacecraft), a Soviet lunar lander
- LK I, a German light tank prototype of the World War I
- LK II, a German light tank of World War I
- LK-700, a Soviet direct ascent lunar lander program proposed in 1964
- .lk, Internet top-level domain for Sri Lanka
- System LK, in mathematics, the classical sequent calculus

== Other uses ==
- LK (index mark code), county Limerick, Ireland, vehicle registration
- The LK, a Swedish indie band
- Sri Lanka (ISO 3166-1 alpha-2 country code LK)
  - .lk, Internet top-level domain for Sri Lanka
  - En-LK, Sri Lankan English
- LK (Carolina Carol Bela), a drum and bass song by DJ Marky, XRS, and Stamina MC

== See also ==
- KL (disambiguation)
- IK (disambiguation)
- 1K (disambiguation)
