= 1K =

1K or 1-K may refer to:

- Astra 1K satellite
- Astra 1KR satellite
- 1K ZX Chess computer program
- Southern Cross Distribution, see IATA code
- Sutra the airline, see IATA code
- BMP-1K, see BMP-1
- BRM-1K, see BMP-1 variants
- HH-1K, see Bell UH-1 Iroquois variants
- XMODEM-1K, a model of XMODEM
- YMODEM-1K, a model of YMODEM
- GSXR 1K, or Suzuki GSX-R1000
- Typ 1K, a chassis code of Volkswagen Golf Mk5
- SSH 1K (WA), see Washington State Route 509
- Premier 1K, a membership level of United Airlines MileagePlus program
- 1k as one thousand

== See also ==
- Kelvin
- Kilobyte
- K (disambiguation)
- K1 (disambiguation)
- IK (disambiguation)
- lK (disambiguation)
- 1000 (disambiguation)
