= Kielecka Street =

Street in Kraków, Poland

Kielecka street
Kraków
- Interactive map of Kielecka street
- Part of: Kraków Grzegórzki district
- Owner: City of Kraków
- Location: Kraków, Poland

Kielecka Street is a street in Kraków, located in district Grzegórzki, within the Oficerskie Estate.

It connects Mogilska Street with Józe Brodowicz Street. It is a single-lane, one-way street.

== History ==
The street was laid out in its current form in the late 1840s–1850s as a military road linking the fortifications of the Kraków Fortress, which were scattered across the city.

When the fortress lost its military significance in the 1920s, the road was incorporated into the city's street network during the construction of the nearby Oficerskie Estate.

The street was officially named "Kielecka" in 1928, referencing the city of Kielce.

== Buildings ==
Sources:

- 3 Kielecka Street – Tenement house (1935).
- 4 Kielecka Street – Tenement house, designed by Józef Jamroz (1934–1935).
- 5 Kielecka Street – Tenement house, designed by Stanisław Gabriel Żeleński (1936).
- 6 Kielecka Street – Tenement house, designed by Adam Ślęzak (1938–1939).
- 8 Kielecka Street – Tenement house, designed by Józef Karwat (1932–1933).
- 9 Kielecka Street – Residential block of Osiedle Oficerskie (1953).
- 17 Kielecka Street (14 Bogdan Zaleski Street) – Tenement house, designed by Zygmunt Szufa (1928–1929).
- 18 Kielecka Street (12 Bogdan Zaleski Street) – Tenement house, designed by Julian Grabowski (1925–1929).
- 19 Kielecka Street – "Aniela" Villa, designed by Józef Karwat (1925).
- 20 Kielecka Street – "Wanda" Villa, designed by Julian Grabowski & Edward Skawiński (1925–1932).
- 21 Kielecka Street (1 Jan Kasprowicz Street) – "Wiktoria" Villa, designed by Edward Skawiński (1926).
- 22 Kielecka Street – Villa, designed by Julian Grabowski & Zygmunt Szufa (1925–1927).
- 25 Kielecka Street – Villa (1928).
- 27 Kielecka Street (Stanisława Moniuszki 21) – House (1930).
- 28 Kielecka Street – House, designed by Bernard Zimmermann (1928–1929).
- 29a Kielecka Street – House, designed by Adam Krogulski (1932–1933).
- 30 Kielecka Street – House, designed by Tadeusz Źróbek (1936–1937).
- 32a Kielecka Street (19 Stanisław Moniuszko Street) – "Bliźniak" (Twin House), designed by Edmund Zgut (1938–1939).
- 34 Kielecka Street (18 Stanisław Moniuszko Street) – "Karolina" House, designed by Adam Ślęzak (1930).
