= Galeria Kazimierz =

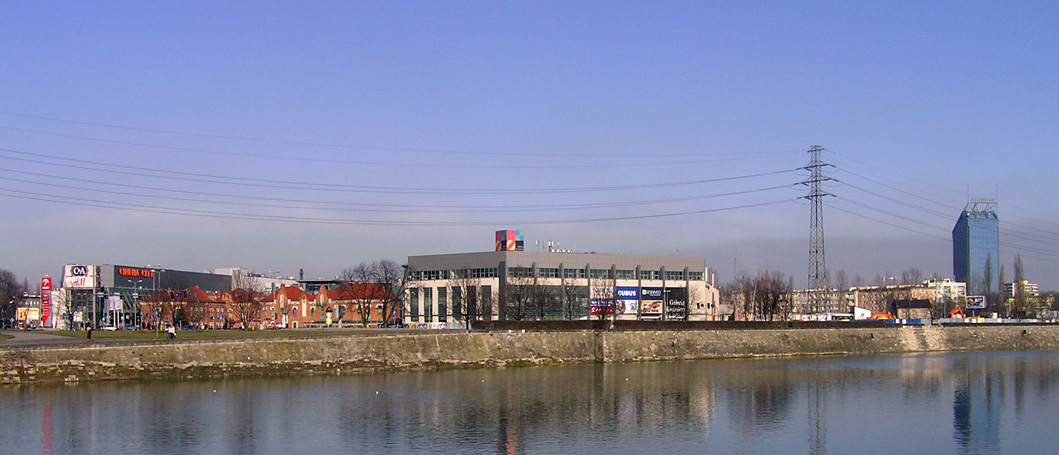
- Galeria Kazimierz as seen from Zabłocie
- Location: Kraków, Poland
- Coordinates: 50°3′12″N 19°57′22″E
- Opened: 2004
- Developer: Globe Trade Centre S.A.
- Num. of stores: 130+
- Floor area: 36,200 m^{2} (390,000 sq ft)
- Floors: 2
- Parking: 1,800 spaces +
- Website: galeriakazimierz.pl

Galeria Kazimierz is a large shopping center located in the Grzegórzki borough of Kraków. The name derives from the neighbouring district of Kazimierz. Phase 1 opened in 2004. The mall has around 38,150 m^{2} of floor space, complete with a wide variety of eateries and large shops such as Zara, Puma, Quiksilver, H&M and Alma Market. In all there is more than 130 retail units present within the mall along with a ten screen cinema. In 2007 construction began on a 6-storey office space which is part of the shopping mall. Galeria Kazimierz was built on the site of the former city slaughterhouse and some of its building were renovated and incorporated into the complex.

== See also ==
- List of shopping malls in Poland
