= KI =

Ki or KI may refer to:

== Music ==
- Ki (album), a 2009 album by Devin Townsend Project
- Ki, a 1979 album by Kitarō
- "Ki", a song from the album Minecraft – Volume Beta by C418

== Businesses and organizations ==
- Adam Air (2002–2008), an Indonesian airline (IATA code KI)
- Karolinska Institute, Swedish university
- Kativik Ilisarniliriniq, a school district in northern Quebec
- Kenyon Institute, a British research institute in Jerusalem
- Kiwanis International, service club
- Klaksvíkar Ítróttarfelag, a Faroese semi-professional football club
- Konservasi Indonesia, an Indonesian non-governmental conservation foundation

== Language ==
- Ki language, a Southern Bantoid language of Cameroon
- Ki (kana), a Japanese syllabic character
- Ki (cuneiform), a sign in cuneiform writing
- Gikuyu language, ISO 639-1 code:ki

== Names ==
- Ki (Korean surname), a Korean surname
- Ki or Qi (surname)
- Ki or Ji (surname)

== Places ==
- Kangaroo Island, South Australia
- Ki Monastery, in India
- Kiawah Island, South Carolina, United States
- King Island (Tasmania), Australia
- Kings Island, Ohio, United States; an amusement park owned by Six Flags
- Kiribati
  - .ki, the ISO 3166-1 alpha-2 country code top level domain for Kiribati
- Kitchenuhmaykoosib Inninuwug First Nation
- Station code for Kurai Taji railway station, in Indonesia

== Religion and metaphysics ==
- Ki (goddess)
- Qi, or ki in Japanese, a vital force according to Chinese culture that forms part of any living thing

== Science and technology ==
=== Biology and chemistry ===
- Ti (plant), also called Kī
- K_{i}, an equilibrium constant for a chemical reaction or process "i":
  - dissociation constant applicable to process, abbreviated as "i".
  - a measure of the binding affinity of a ligand to a biomolecule
- Potassium iodide, chemical formula KI
- Gene knockin or Knock-in, a genetic engineering method
- Ki Database, a database of biochemical information

=== Computing ===
- Ki (prefix symbol), the prefix symbol of the binary unit prefix kibi
- Ki, International Electrotechnical Commission standard symbol for number 1024
- K-I algorithm, Kittler and Illingworth iterative algorithm for image segmentation thresholding
- Ki (or K_{i}), the unique cryptographic key of each cell phone's SIM card

=== Electronics ===
- Ki (standard), a wireless power transmission standard for kitched appliances from the Wireless Power Consortium

== Other uses ==
- Knowledge integration, in epistemology
- Grover C. Winn (1886–1943), nicknamed "Ki", American lawyer and politician
- Gakirah Barnes (died 2014), nicknamed "K.I" or "KI", American gangster
- Kitchener line (KI) of the GO Transit rail network in Ontario, Canada

== See also ==
- KL (disambiguation)
- K1 (disambiguation)
