= Grzegórzki, Kraków (district) =

Dzielnica II Grzegórzki
- Dzielnica of Kraków
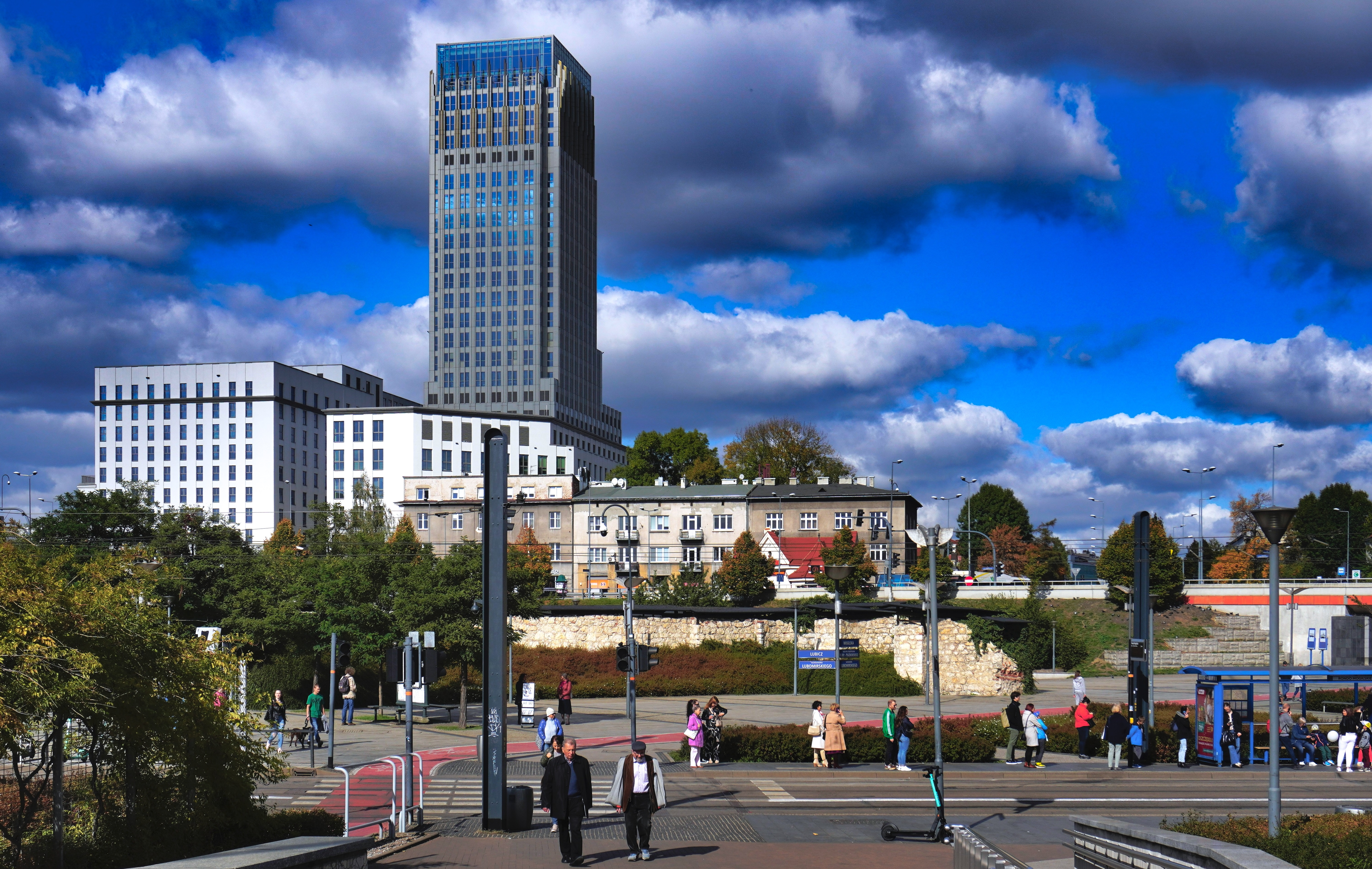
- Rondo Mogilskie - main transport hub of the district

- Location of Grzegórzki within Kraków
- Coordinates: 50°3′23.8″N 19°57′11.8″E
- Country: Poland
- Voivodeship: Lesser Poland
- County/City: Kraków

Government
  - President: Małgorzata Ciemięga

Area
  - Total: 5.85 km^{2} (2.26 sq mi)

Population (2014)
  - Total: 28,960
  - Density: 4,950/km^{2} (12,800/sq mi)
- Time zone: UTC+1 (CET)
  - Summer (DST): UTC+2 (CEST)
- Area code: +48 12
- Website: http://www.dzielnica2.krakow.pl

District II Grzegórzki (Polish: Dzielnica II Grzegórzki) is a district of the city of Kraków, Poland located in the central part of the city. The name Grzegórzki comes from a village of same name that is now a part of the district.

According to the Central Statistical Office data, the district's area is 5.85 square kilometres (2.26 square miles) and 28 960 people inhabit Grzegórzki.

== History ==
The oldest part of the district is Wesoła, stretching along Lubicz and Kopernika Streets, which originated as a suburb around St Nicolas' Church on today's Kopernika Street. Situated next to it, Grzegórzki is a former village, incorporated into Krakow in 1910. At the end of the 19th and beginning of the 20th century it was heavily industrialised. A strike in 1936 at the Semperit factory was bloodily suppressed, resulting in 8 deaths. In the northern part of the district, mainly along Beliny-Prażmowskiego and Brodowicza streets, the Officers' housing estate was built from 1925. From the end of the 20th century, the district gradually lost its industrial character and was transformed into an office and residential area. Some of the former factories have been revitalised and transformed into multi-functional complexes, such as Browar Lubicz, Fabryczna City complex and Galeria Kazimierz

== Subdivisions of Grzegórzki ==
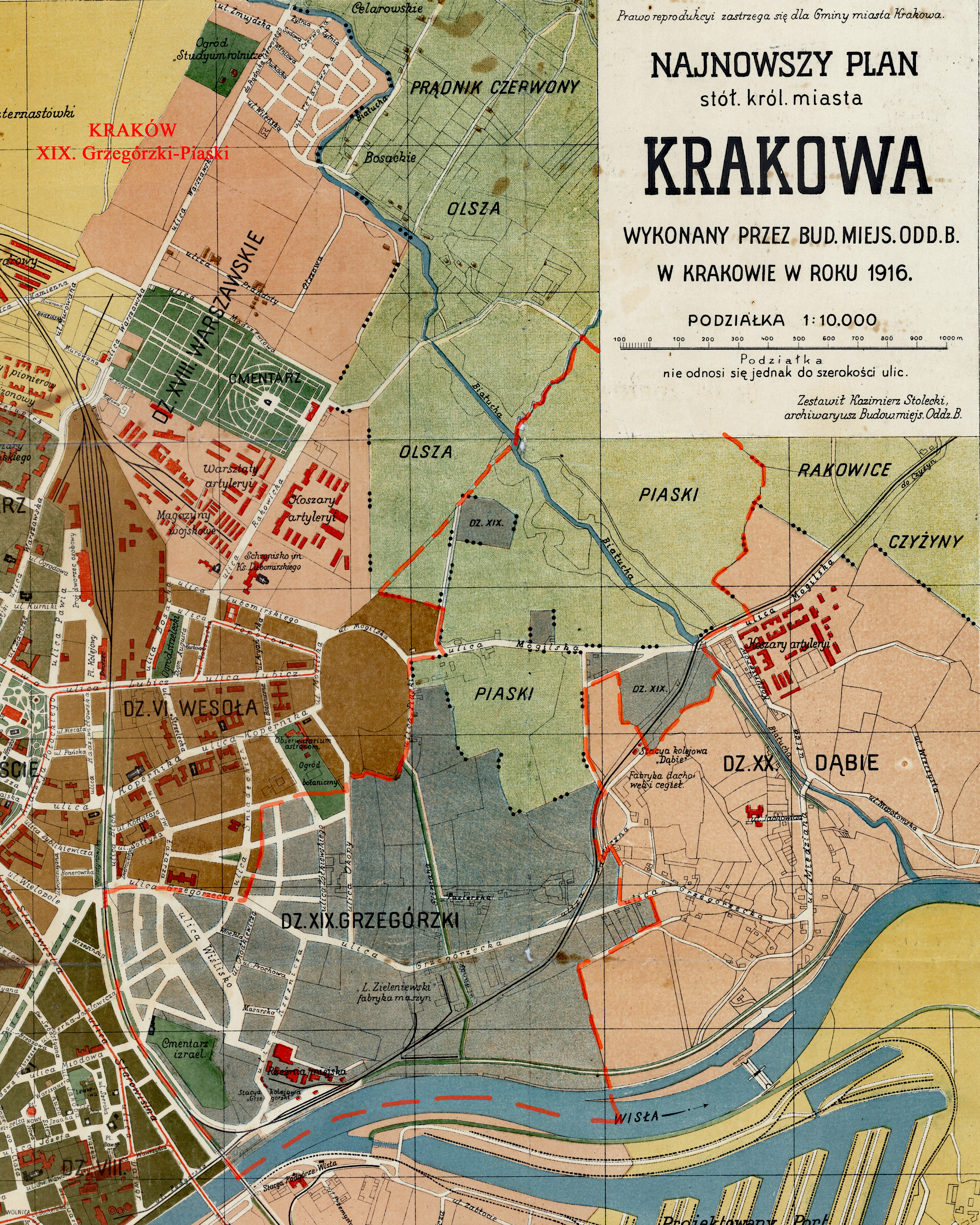
Historical city plan with Wesoła, Grzegórzki and Dąbie marked. The Officers' Housing Estate (Osiedle Oficerskie) was later built on land described on the plan as Olsza.

Grzegórzki is divided into smaller subdivisions (osiedla). Here's a list of them.

- Dąbie
- Olsza
- Wesoła
- Grzegórzki
- Osiedle Oficerskie

== Landmarks ==
- Church of the Immaculate Conception - former Carmelite church, built 1634-1683 in Baroque style
- Botanic Garden of the Jagiellonian University - founded in 1783
- Kraków University of Economics - designed by Tadeusz Stryjeński and Władysław Ekielski and built 1891-1893 in Renaissance Revival style
- Basilica of the Sacred Heart of Jesus - designed by Franciszek Mączyński, built 1907–1921 in Art Nouveau style with historical motifs
- Krakow Market Hall - built 1937-1940 in modernist style
- K1 Building - skyscraper built 1972-1998 in Postmodern style
- Unity Tower - skyscraper built 1975-2019 in Postmodern style
- Kraków Opera - designed by Romuald Loegler and built 2004-2008 in Postmodern style
- Galeria Kazimierz - shopping mall built 2004-2005 on the site of the former city slaughterhouse with some of its buildings incorporated into the complex
- Lubicz Brewery - former brewery converted into a multifunctional complex
- Fabryczna City - former distillery converted into a multifunctional complex
- Monument to the Armed Deed of the Krakow Proletariat - commemorating the bloodily suppressed strike at the ‘Semperit’ factory in 1936

== Gallery ==
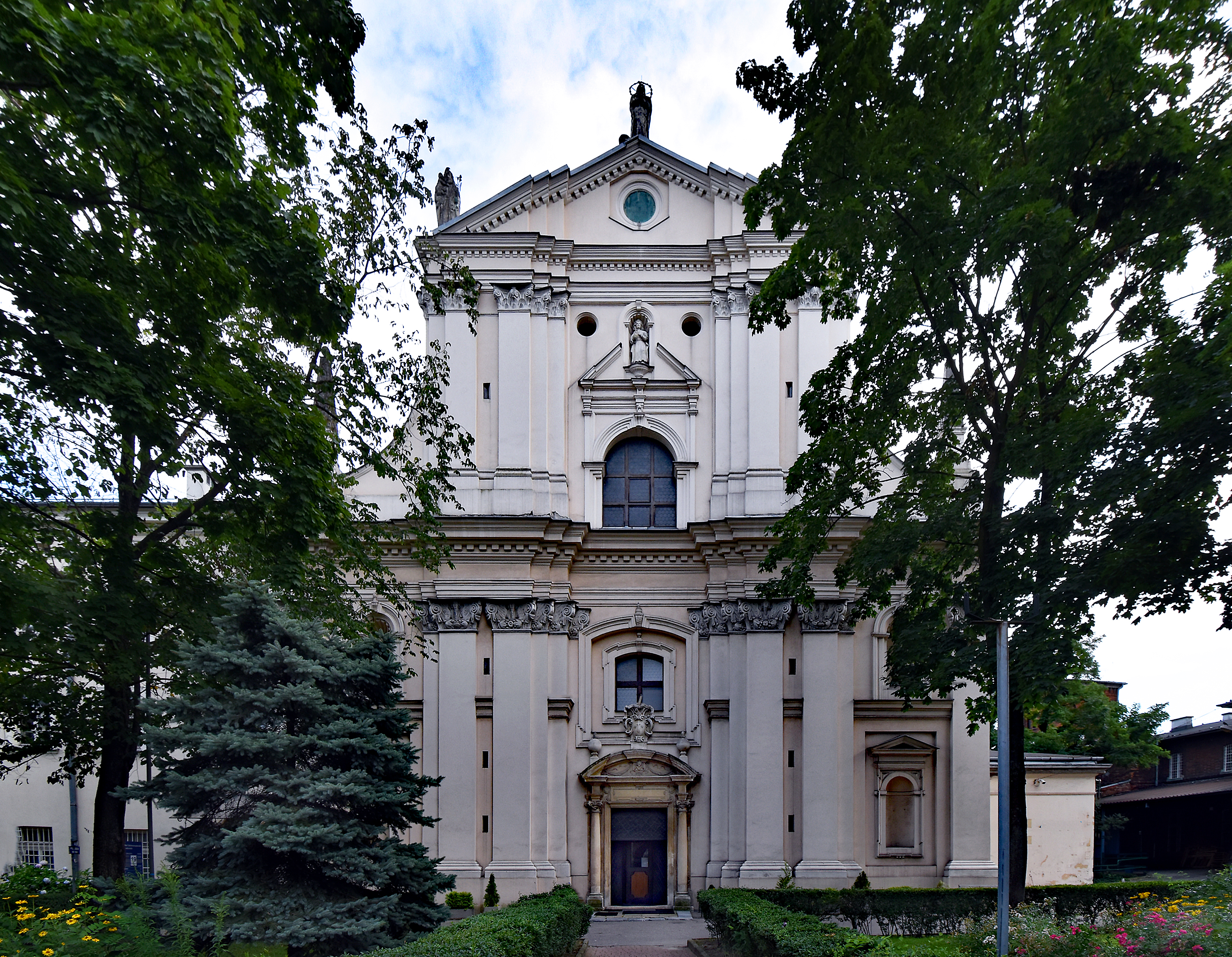
Church of the Immaculate Conception

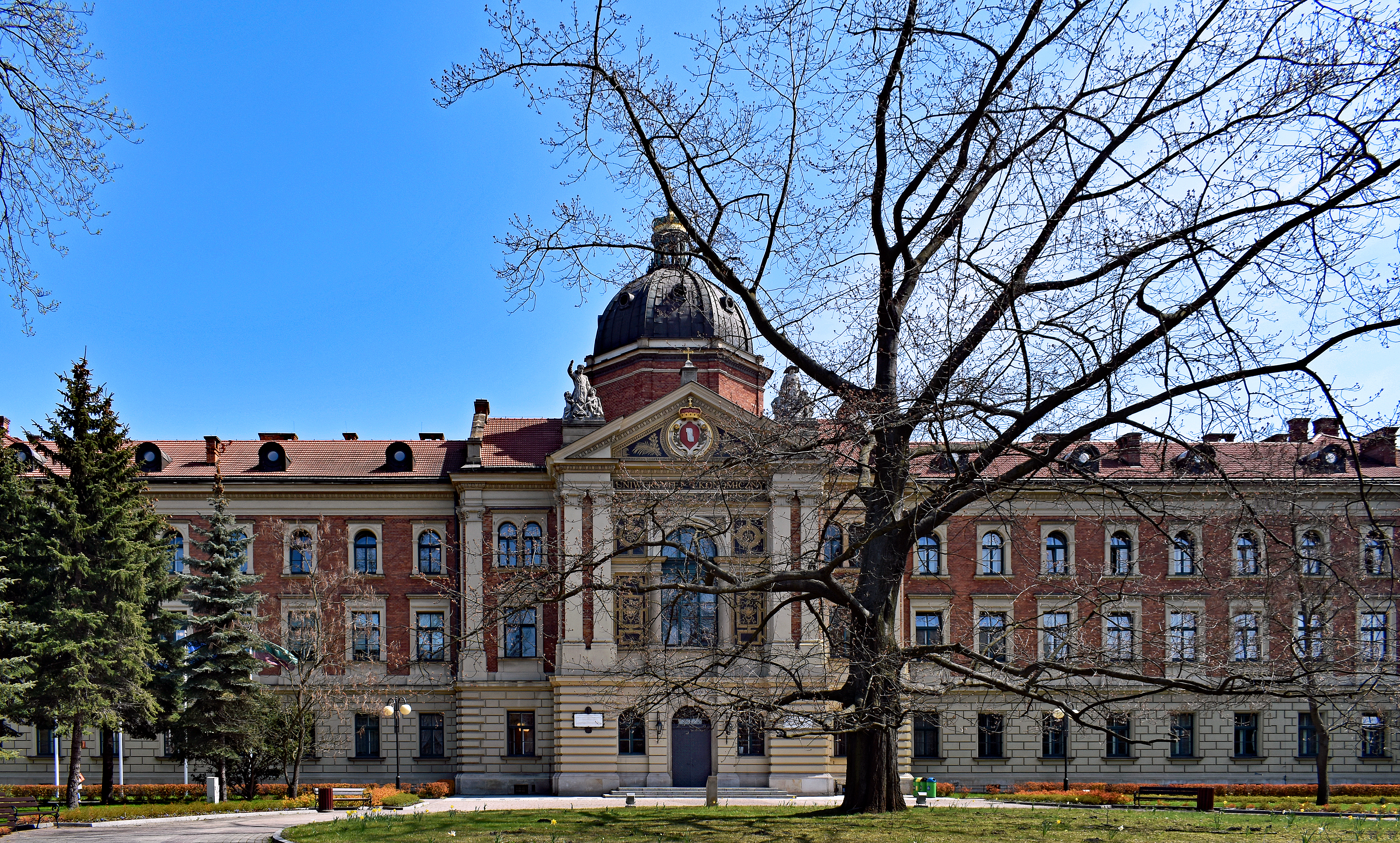
Kraków University of Economics

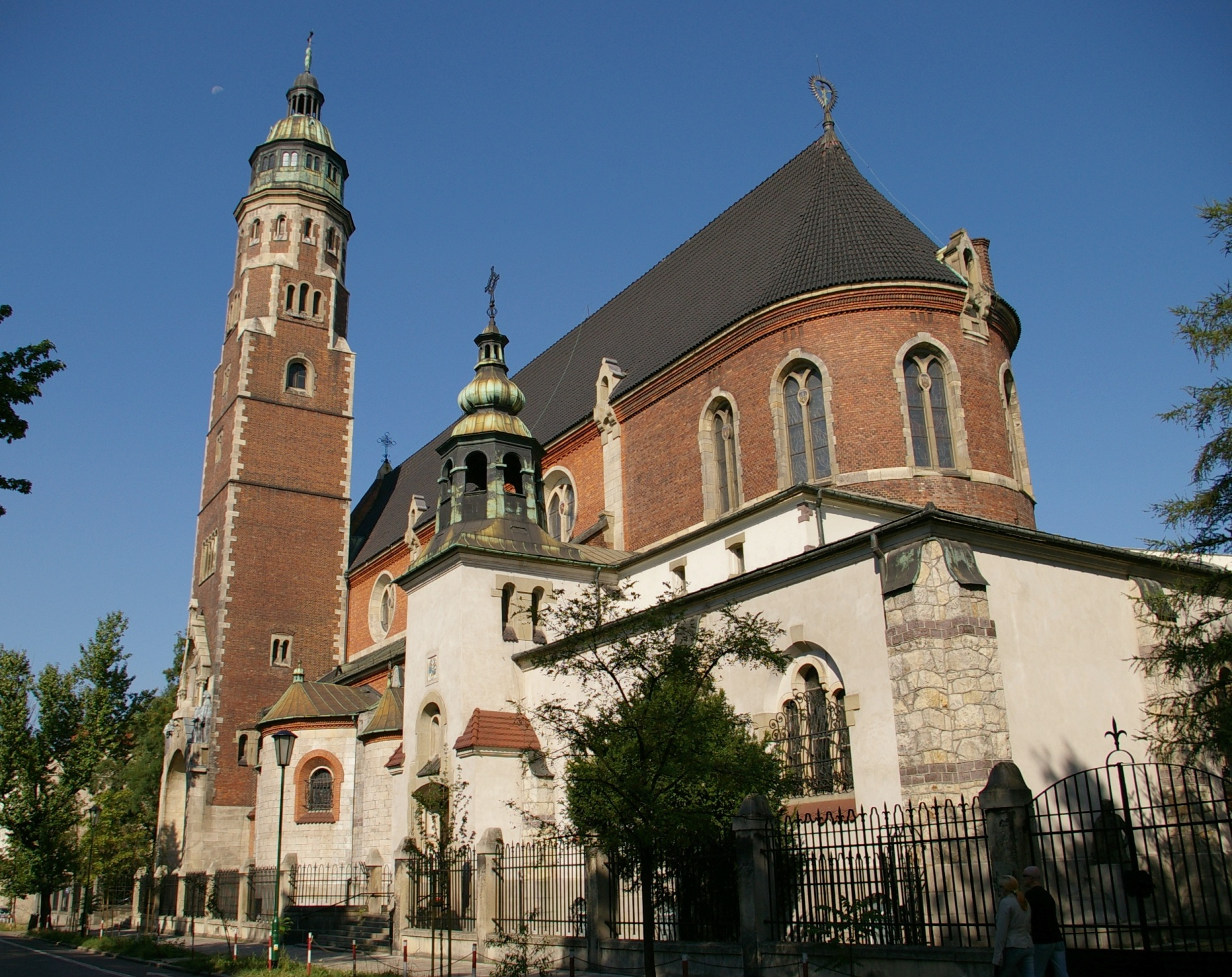
Basilica of the Sacred Heart of Jesus

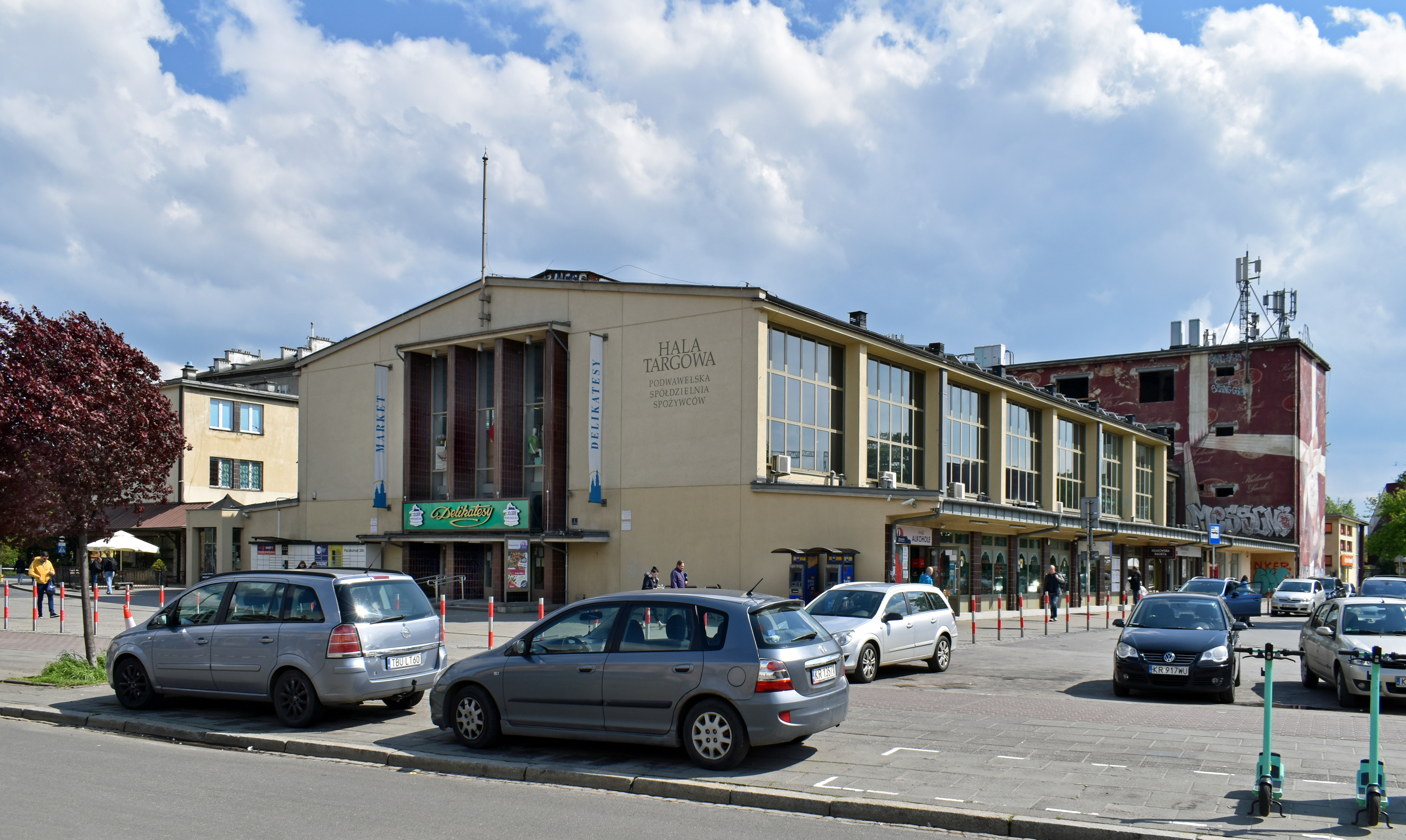
Kraków Market Hall

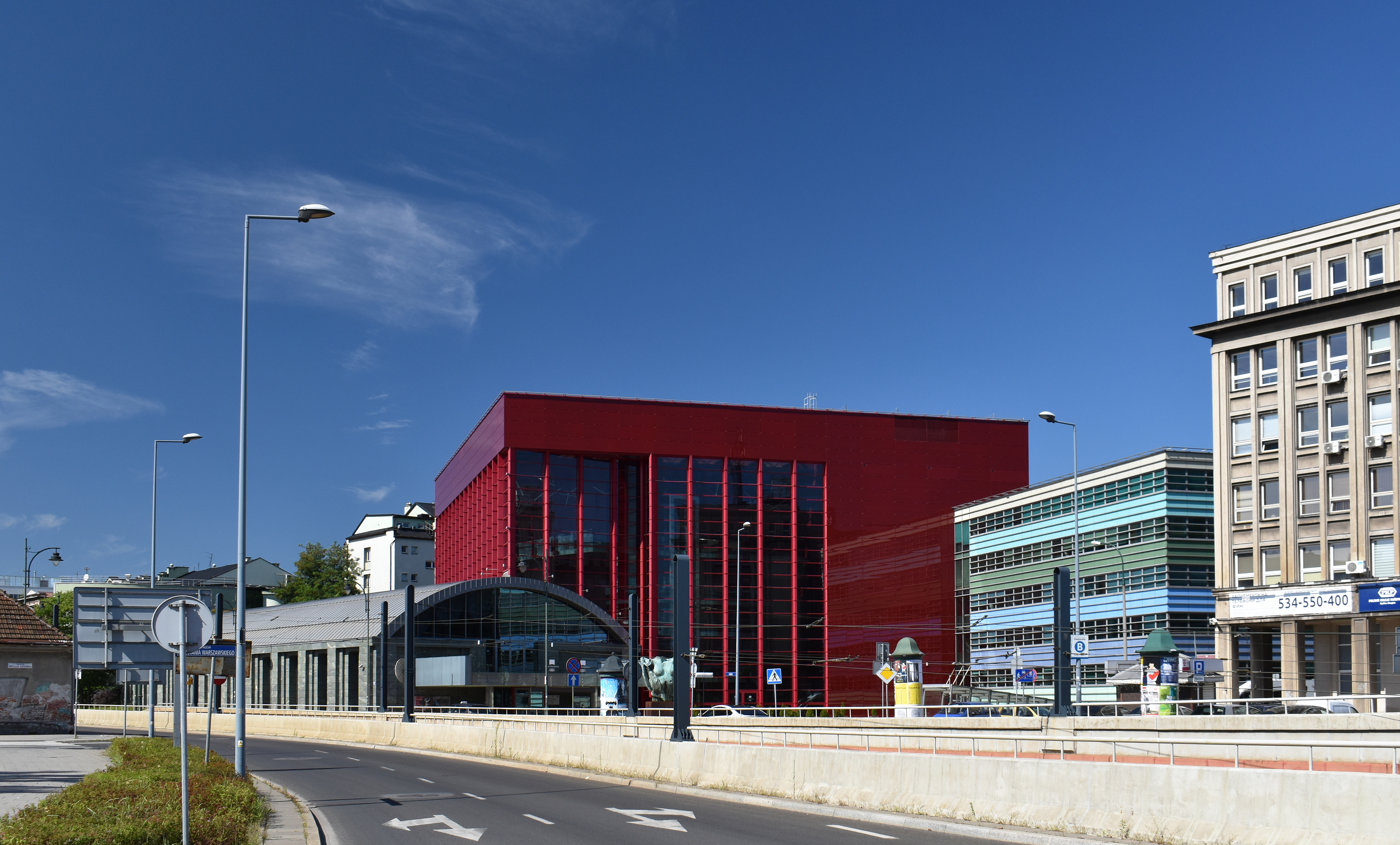
Kraków Opera

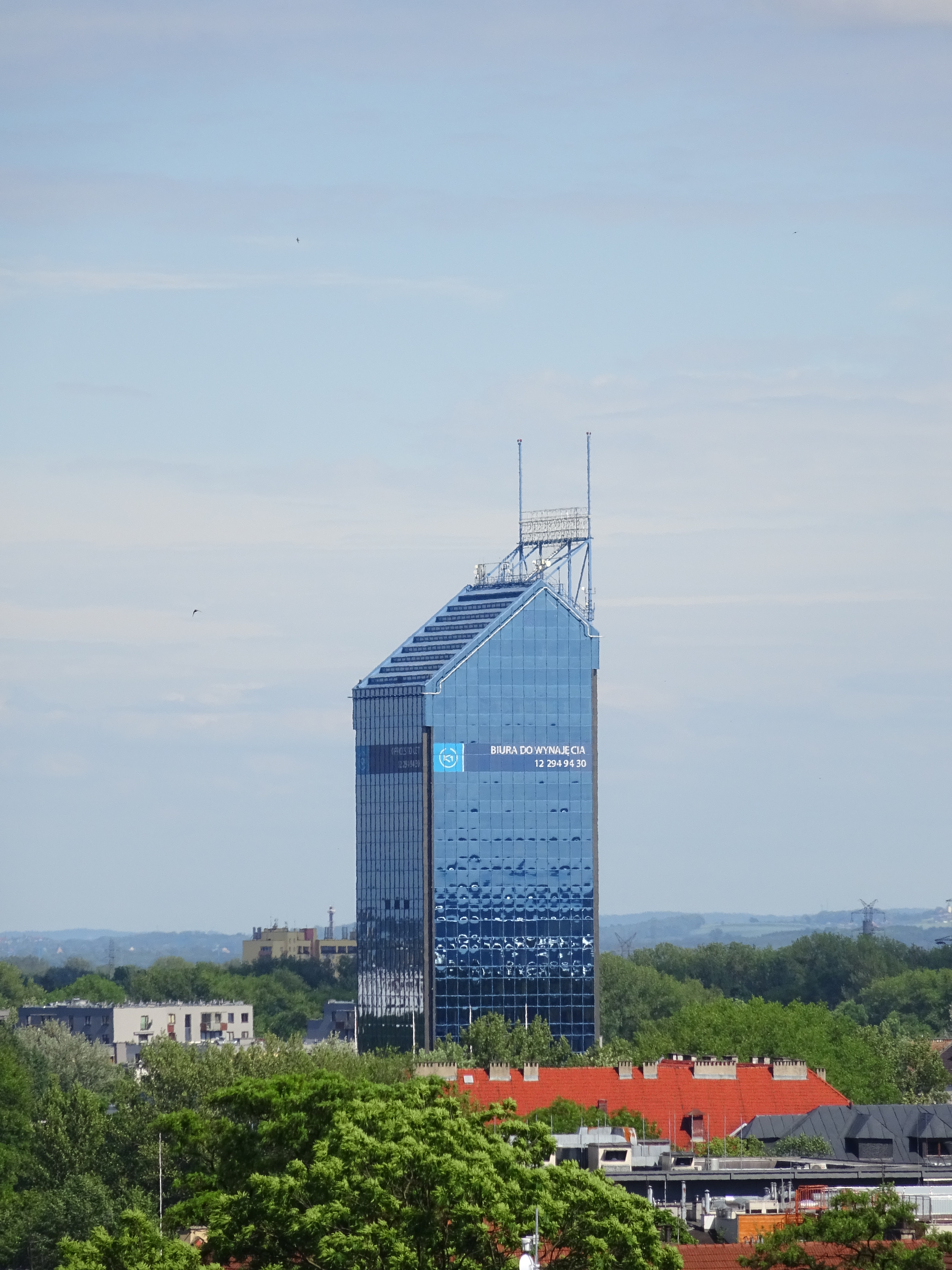
K1 Building

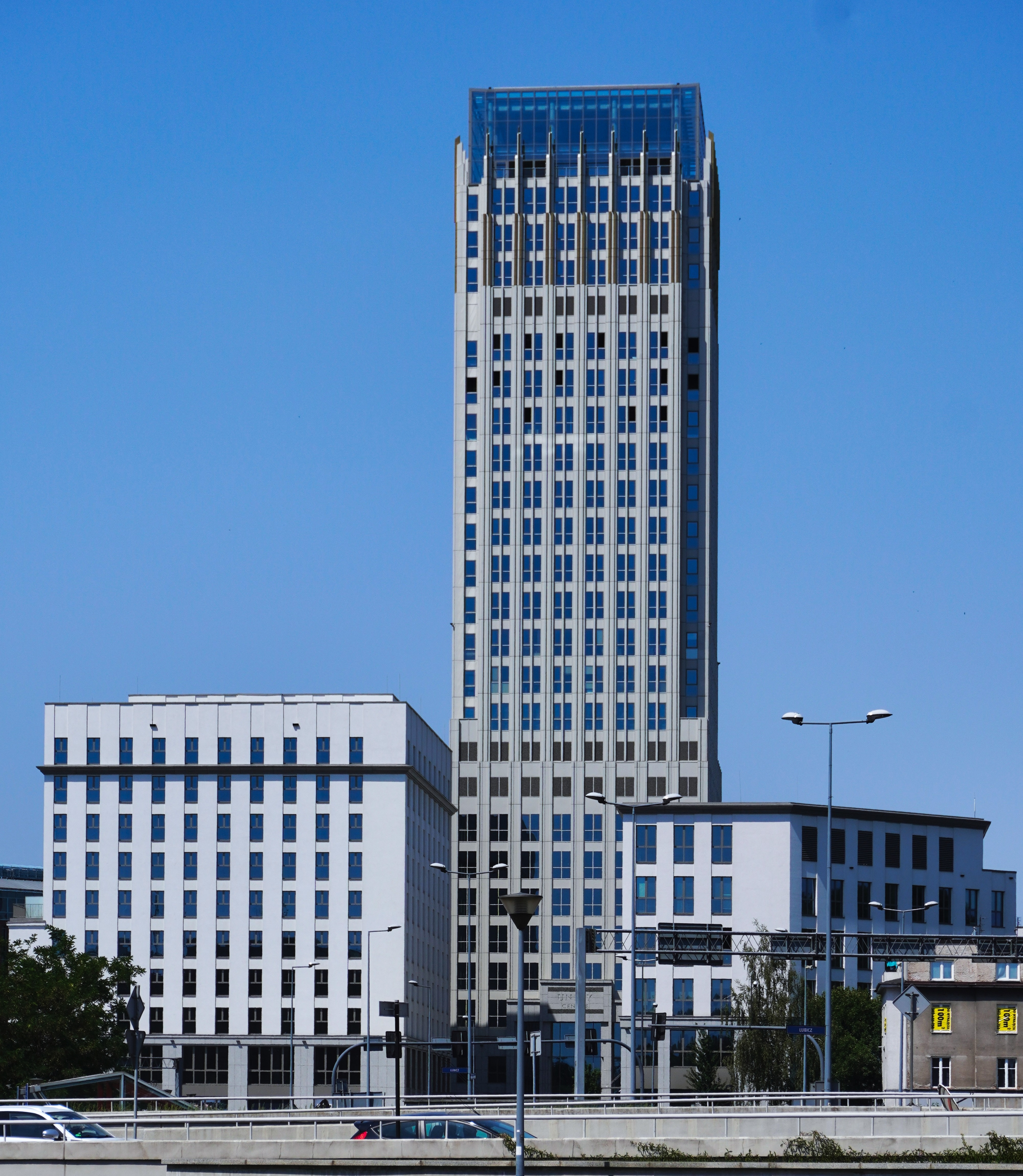
Unity Tower

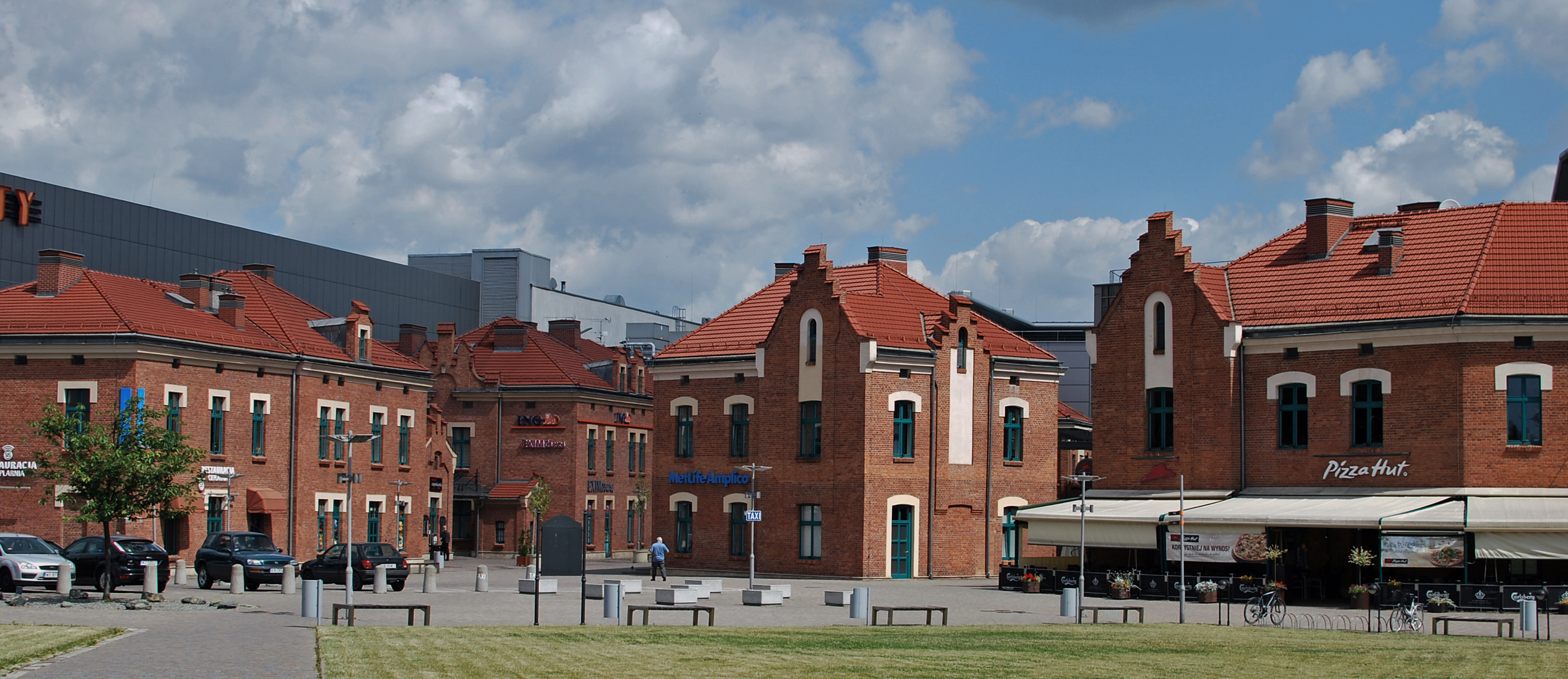
Former city slaughterhouse, now Galeria Kazimierz

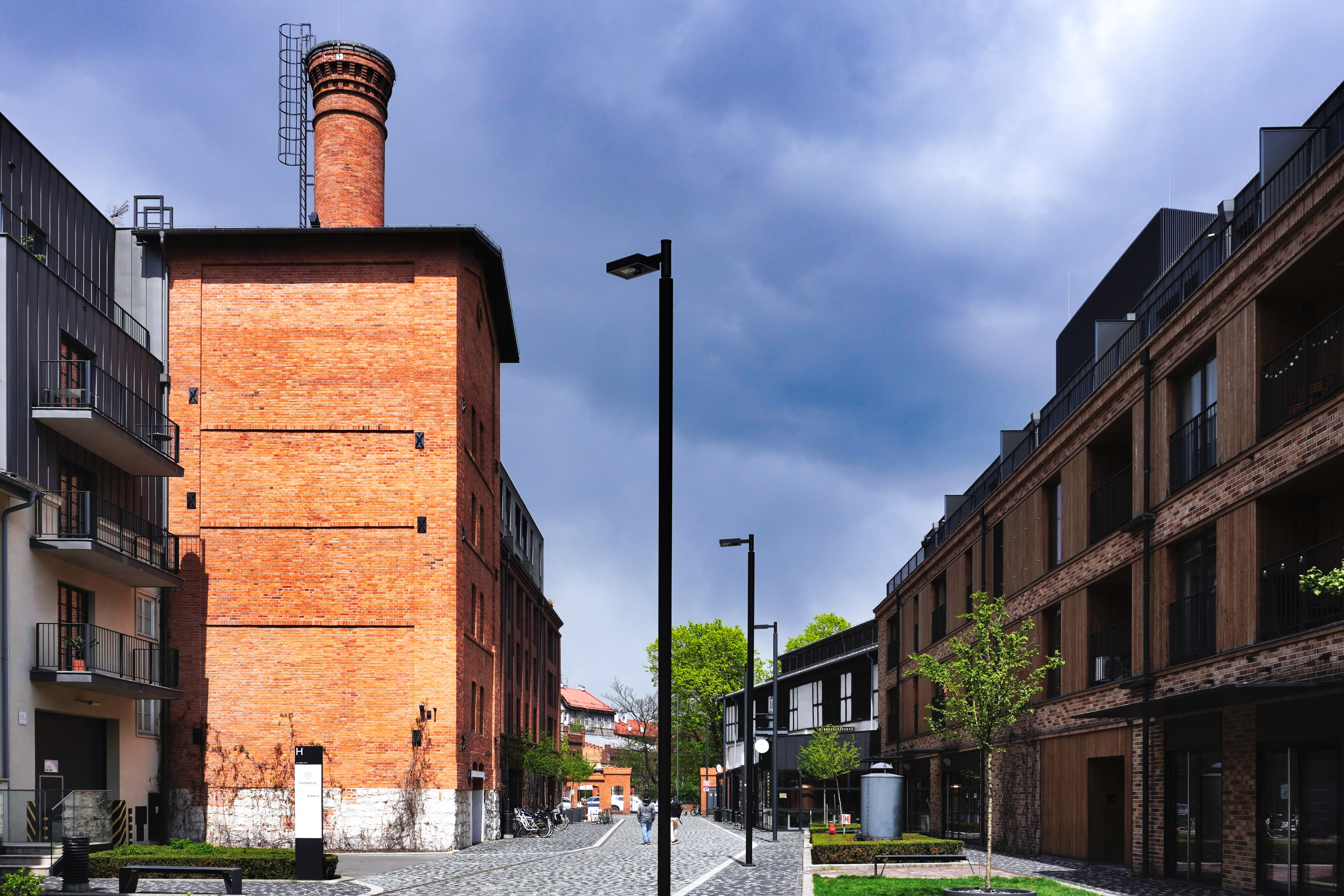
Lubicz Brewery

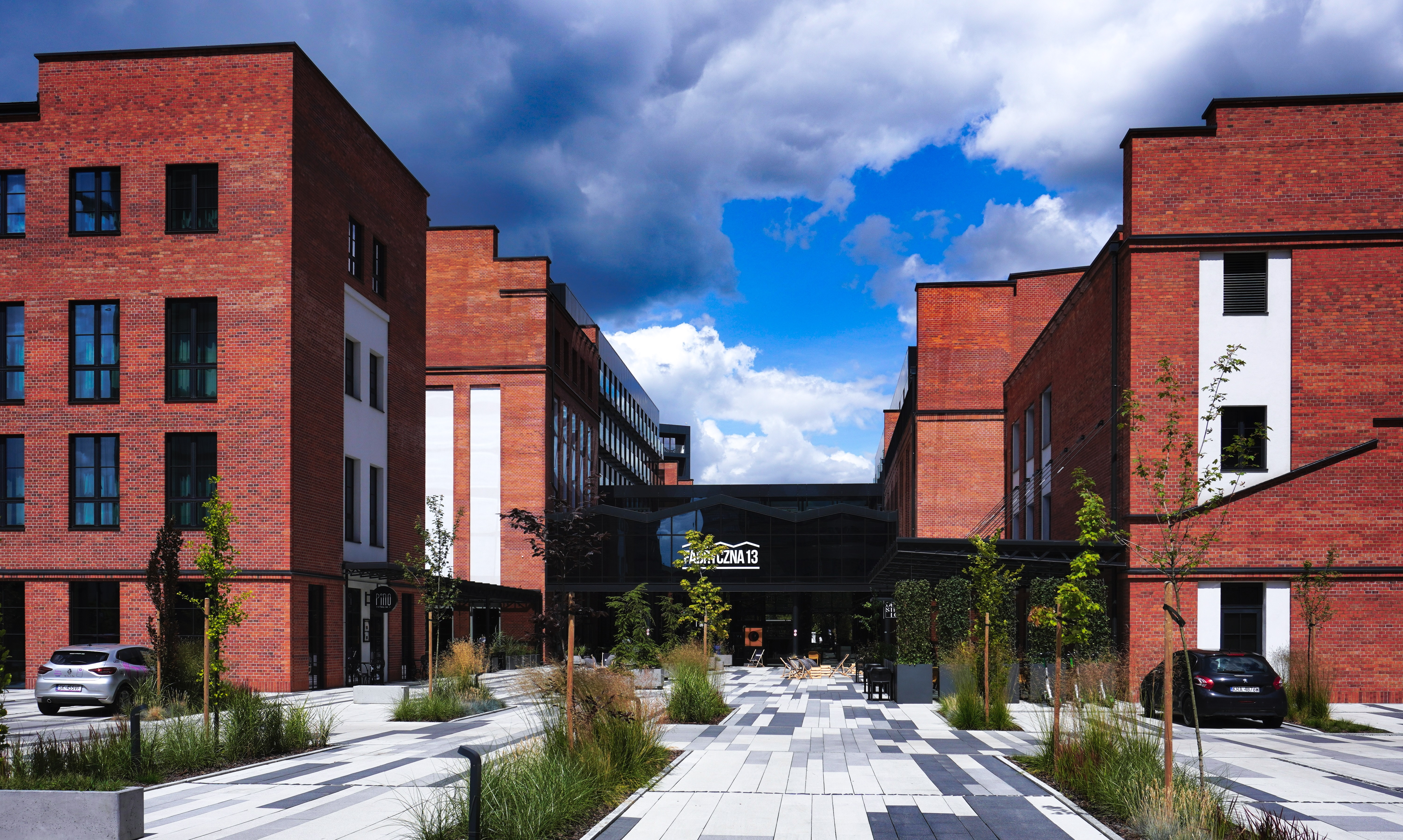
Fabryczna City complex in a former destillery
