= Polish Federation of Engineering Associations =

Largest association of engineers and technicians in Poland

Federation of Engineering Associations FSNT–NOT Naczelna Organizacja Techniczna
- Type: NGO
- Location(s): ul. Czackiego 3/5, Warsaw
- Region served: Poland
- Members: c. 110,000
- Key people: President Ewa Mańkiewicz–Cudny (TKT); General Secretary Jerzy Gumiński (SITPMB)
- Website: www.not.org.pl/not

The Polish Federation of Engineering Associations (Polish: Naczelna Organizacja Techniczna (NOT)), translated interchangeably as: the Polish Chief, Main or Central Technical Organization; also known as Federacja Stowarzyszeń Naukowo–Technicznych (FSNT) in Polish, is the biggest Polish association representing professional engineers and technicians with 110,000 members and 49 regional branches (Engineering Associations) across the country. Its headquarters have been in Warsaw since 1905.

A similar organization was founded in 1835 in Paris, France as the Polish Polytechnical Society, during the military Partitions of Poland by foreign powers. Since 1905 the association of Polish engineers has had a permanent office in Warsaw at Dom Technika located at ul. Czackiego 3/5. After World War II, the organization was re-activated on the initiative of Bolesław Rumiński in already liberated Warsaw on December 12, 1945. It was commonly known as NOT in Communist Poland, and renamed after the Revolutions of 1989 as the NOT Federation (Federacja Stowarzyszeń Naukowo-Technicznych – NOT). Since June 28, 2005 it had been called the Federation of Engineering Associations of Poland (Federacja Stowarzyszeń Naukowo-Technicznych w Polsce).

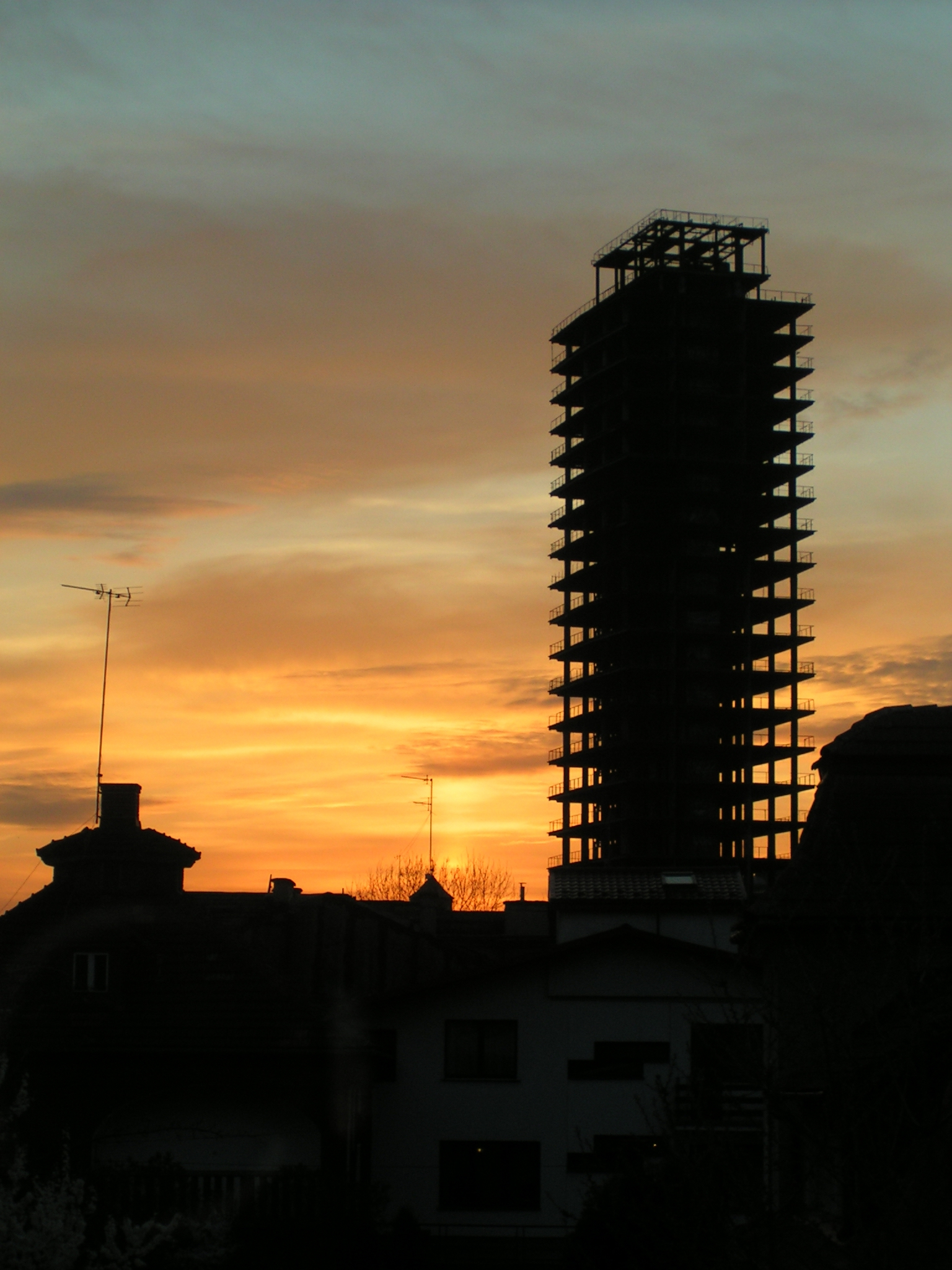
Szkieletor in 2008, the unfinished NOT Tower, Kraków

== Szkieletor controversy ==
In the Edward Gierek decade in Communist Poland, the Naczelna Organizacja Techniczna NOT began the construction of the 92-metre (24-floor) high-rise building known as the NOT Tower in Kraków. It was intended to provide a large amount of office space. The concrete shell was erected in 1975, but the building was never finished, because of economic constraints and political unrest leading to the imposition of martial law in Poland in 1981. In time, due to the unfinished (and blackening) building's resemblance to a skeleton, it was nicknamed "Szkieletor" by the people of Kraków after Skeletor, the arch-villain in He-Man and the Masters of the Universe, a cartoon popular in Poland at that time.

For years the structure remained the biggest eyesore in the Kraków skyline, reportedly named by the editors of Huffington Post as one of the top-ten "post-apocalyptic" (i.e. abandoned and deserted) buildings in the world. The "NOT Tower" has since 2005 been owned by TreiMorfa Project, who have expressed interest in renovating it. Apparently, its controlled demolition suggested earlier by the British firm Medinbrand Ltd. has been rejected by the Magistrate after further inspections, due to its structural stability. More recently, in December 2011 the heated debate about its possible future, based on brand new plans by TreiMorfa, has been cut short by the local courts for legal reasons. Those most disappointed, it seems, are the average citizens. The construction finally resumed in 2016 and the construction work of the Unity Tower was completed on 30 September 2020.
