= K1 (building) =

Office building in Kraków, Poland

Coordinates: 50°03′26.30″N 19°57′39.20″E

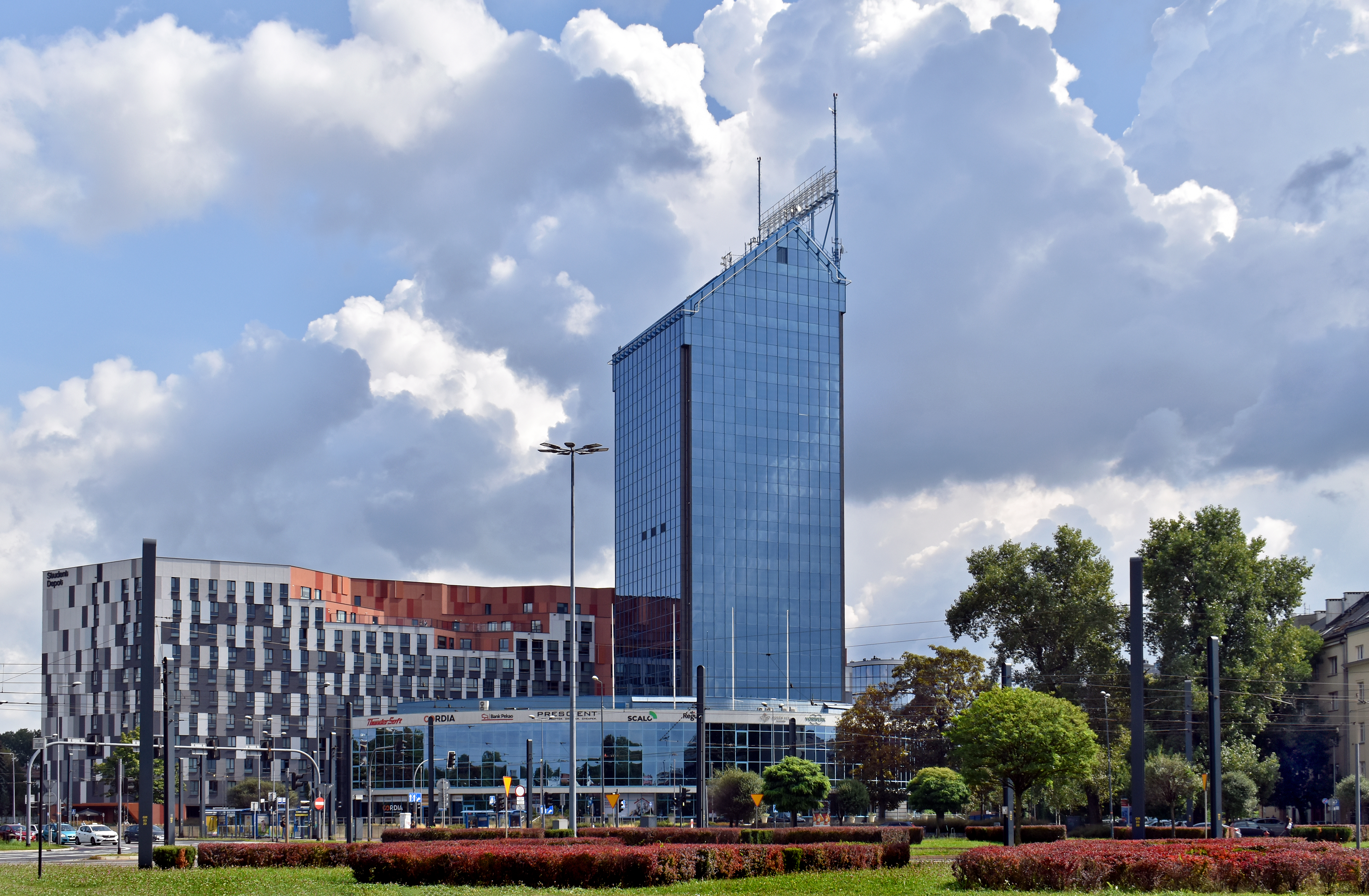
- Interactive map of the K1 area

General information
- Status: Completed
- Type: Office
- Location: Kraków, Poland
- Construction started: 1972
- Completed: 1998

Height
- Architectural: 105 m (344 ft)

Technical details
- Floor count: 20

Design and construction
- Architects: Janusz Ingarden (original); Krzysztof Kiedra (modified)

K1 (formerly Cracovia Business Center), also Błękitek, is a commercial building in Kraków, Poland, at 1 Pokoju Avenue, near the Grzegórzeckie Roundabout. It is a 20-story building, housing offices for Bank Pekao and other companies. It is 105 metres high, which makes it the tallest office building and the second tallest building in Kraków.

== History ==
The history of the building dates back to the early 1970s. Plans were made to construct a larger number of similarly tall skyscrapers in the Grzegórzki district (referred to as "Kraków's Manhattan"). Apart from today's K1, only the structurally and formally similar Unity Tower (formerly: NOT Office Building) was built. Its construction began in 1975, was halted in 1979, and resumed in 2016, finally being completed in 2020.

In 1972, the construction of the skyscraper began based on a design by architect Janusz Ingarden, intended as the headquarters of the Workers' Publishing Cooperative "Prasa" (hence the abbreviated name RSW "Prasa"). In 1975, the building was left in an unfinished state—load-bearing tests revealed that the structure could not support the weight of the printing machines needed for newspaper production. The completed building had an orange-yellow color and, for the time, innovative windows coated with a very thin layer of gold, which, however, proved to be highly non-durable and not resistant to external conditions.

In the mid-1990s, the skyscraper was purchased by the Swedish company Swede Center Ltd., which initially planned to demolish the building and construct a new complex. However, it was determined that it would be more cost-effective to renovate the building and adapt it to more modern standards. The architectural redesign was carried out by Krzysztof Kiendra as the lead designer, with Wacław Kujbida and Adam Reczek as co-designers, in collaboration with Witold Nowak, Marta Lipska, Zbigniew Filipek, Thomas Wahlberg, Marius Lorentzen, and Jarosław Dąbrowski. The renovation began in 1996 and was completed in 1998. During this time, the skyscraper underwent a complete overhaul: its structure was reinforced and slightly modified, the office space was expanded, the top four floors were lowered, and five new slanted floors were added. The building was also covered with blue glass imported from Luxembourg, which earned it its unofficial but most popular name. The renovated skyscraper was renamed "Cracovia Business Center." The modernization of the office building was awarded the title "Construction of the Year 1998" under the patronage of the Marshal of the Małopolska Region for its design and execution.

In 2014, the skyscraper underwent another modernization, this time focusing on the interior while preserving its distinctive external appearance. It also changed its name from "Cracovia Business Center" to "K1.

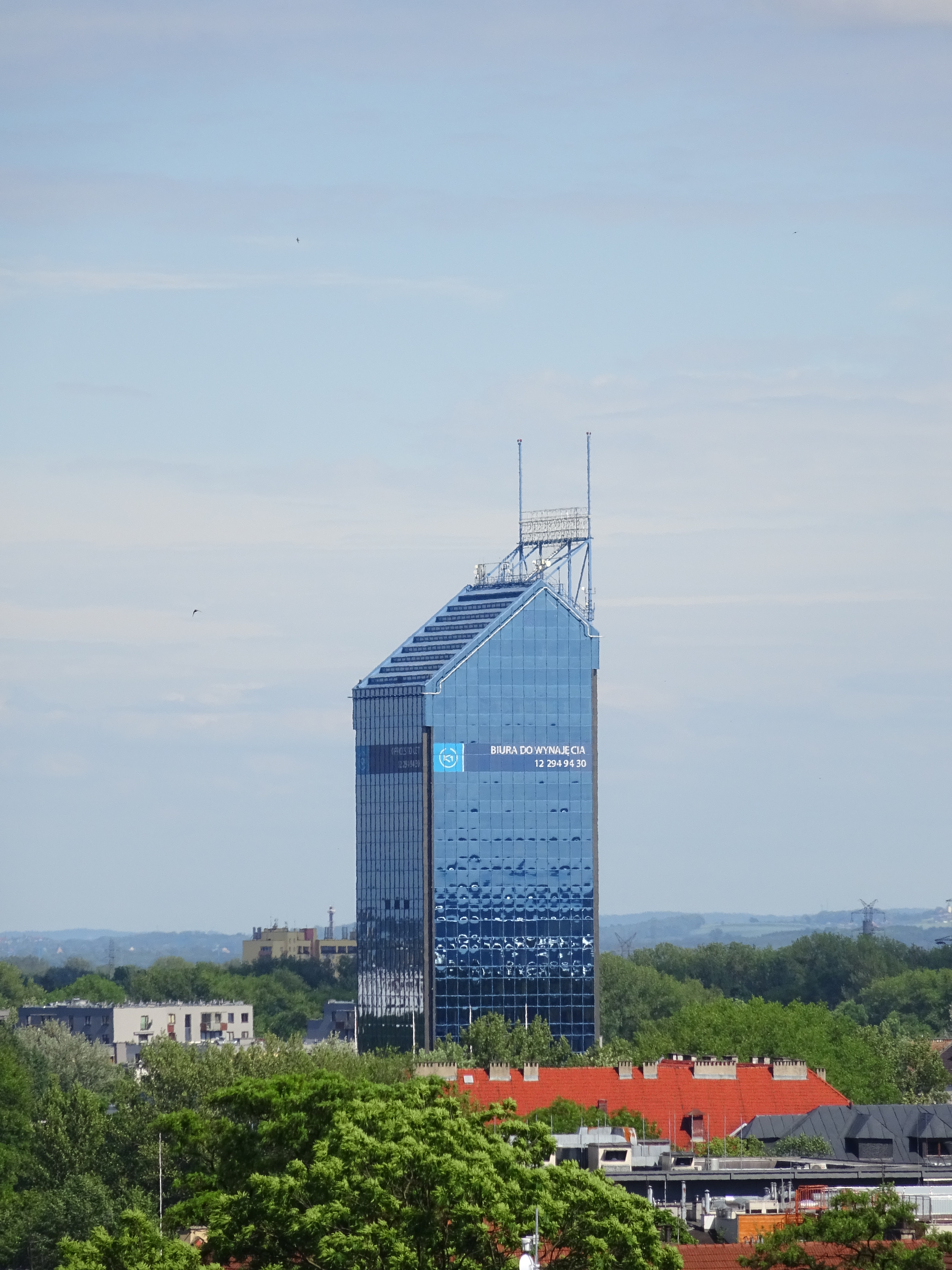
View from the roof of the Academy of Music

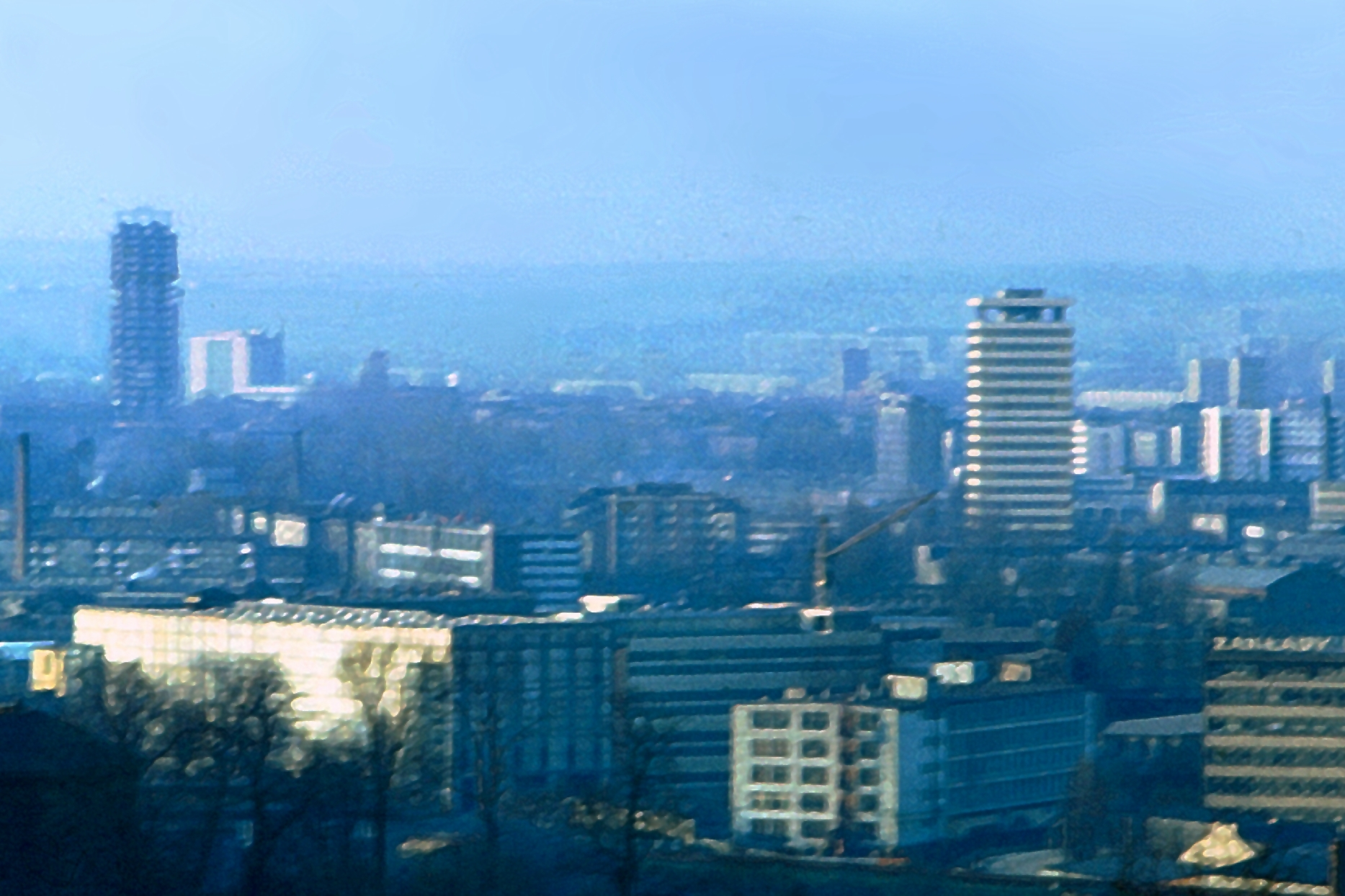
On the right, Błękitek before modernization, in the background on the left, Szkieletor (1980)

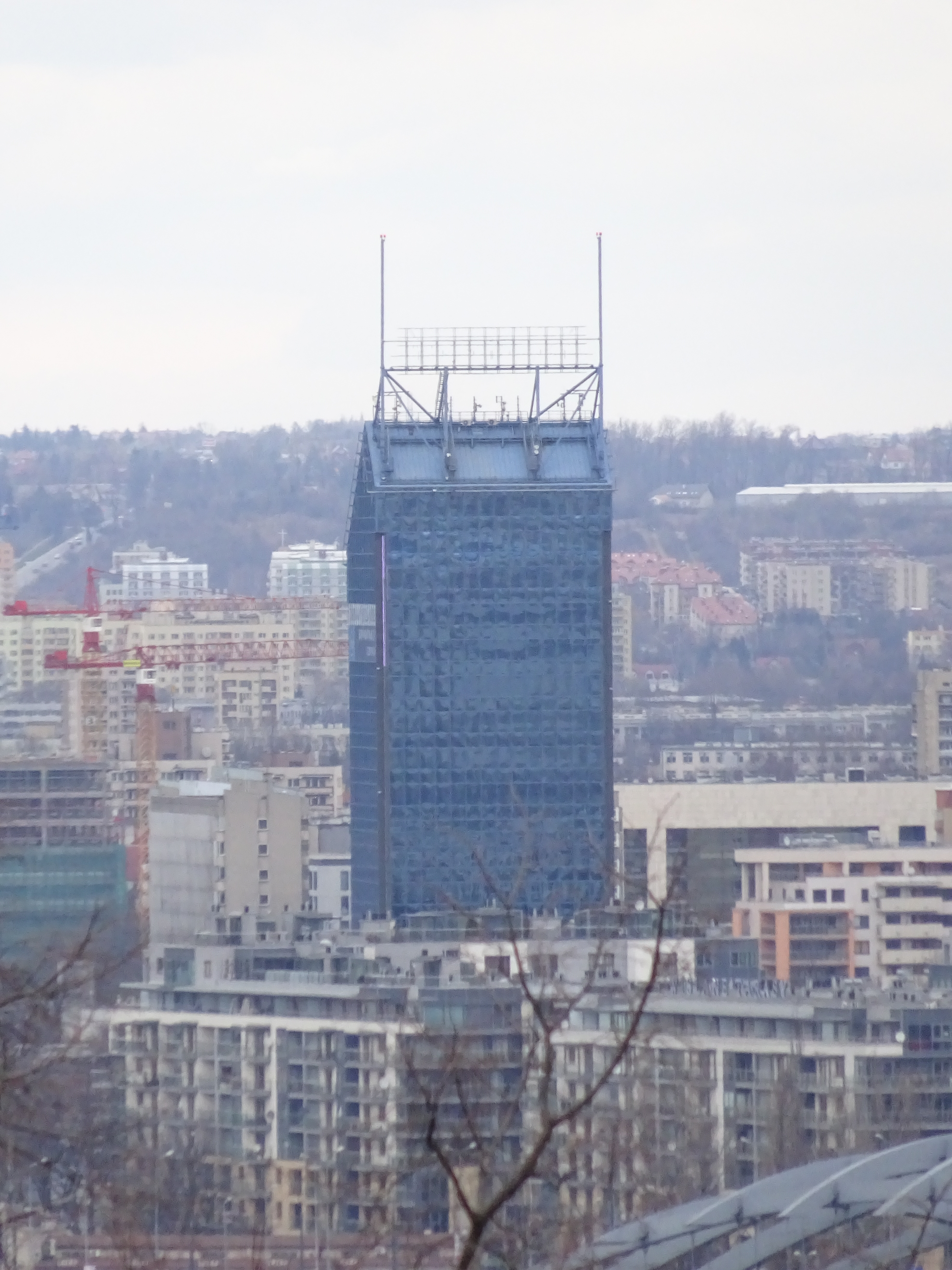
View of the skyscraper from the top of Krakus Mound

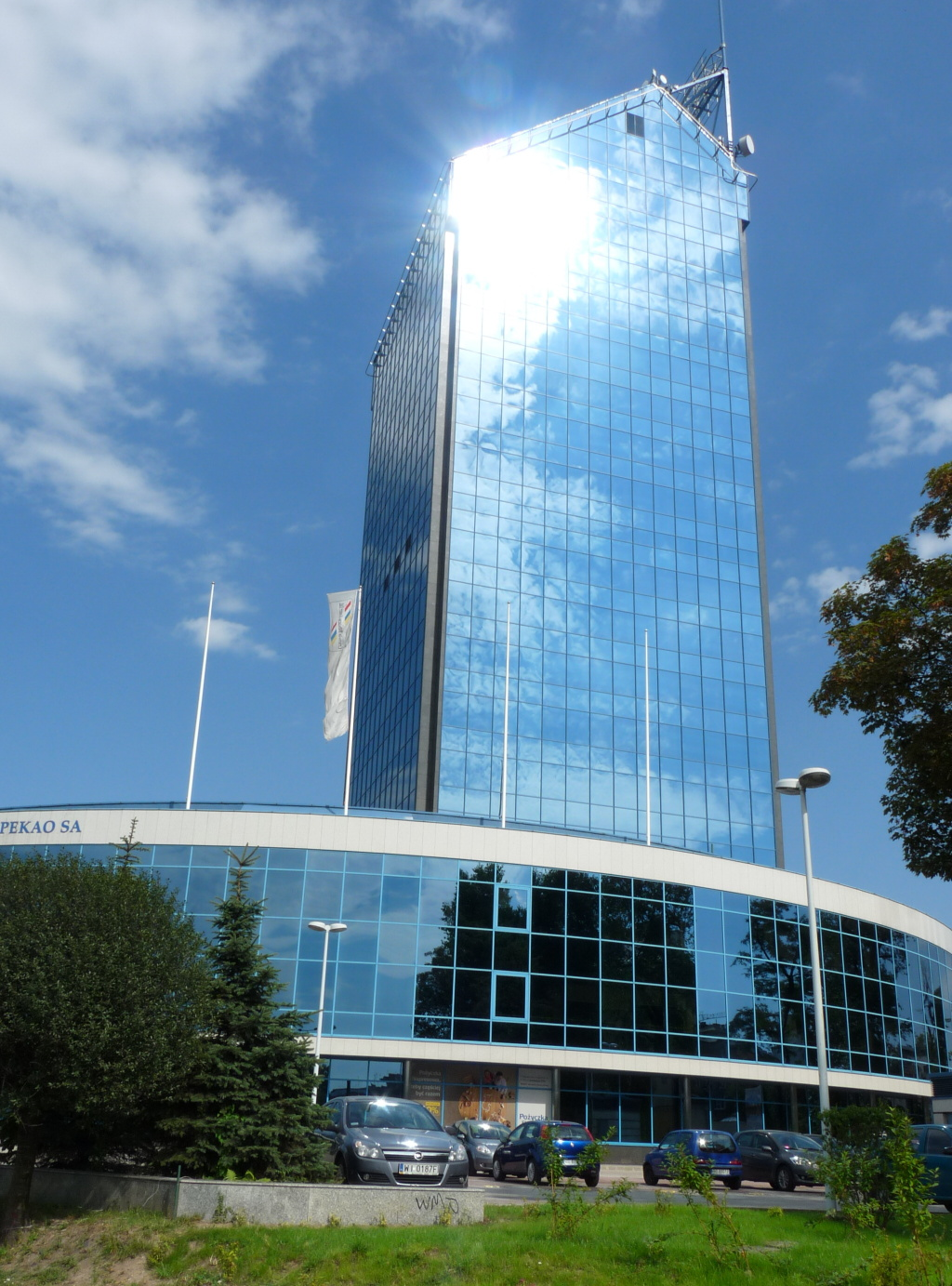
View from Grzegórzeckie Roundabout (2009)

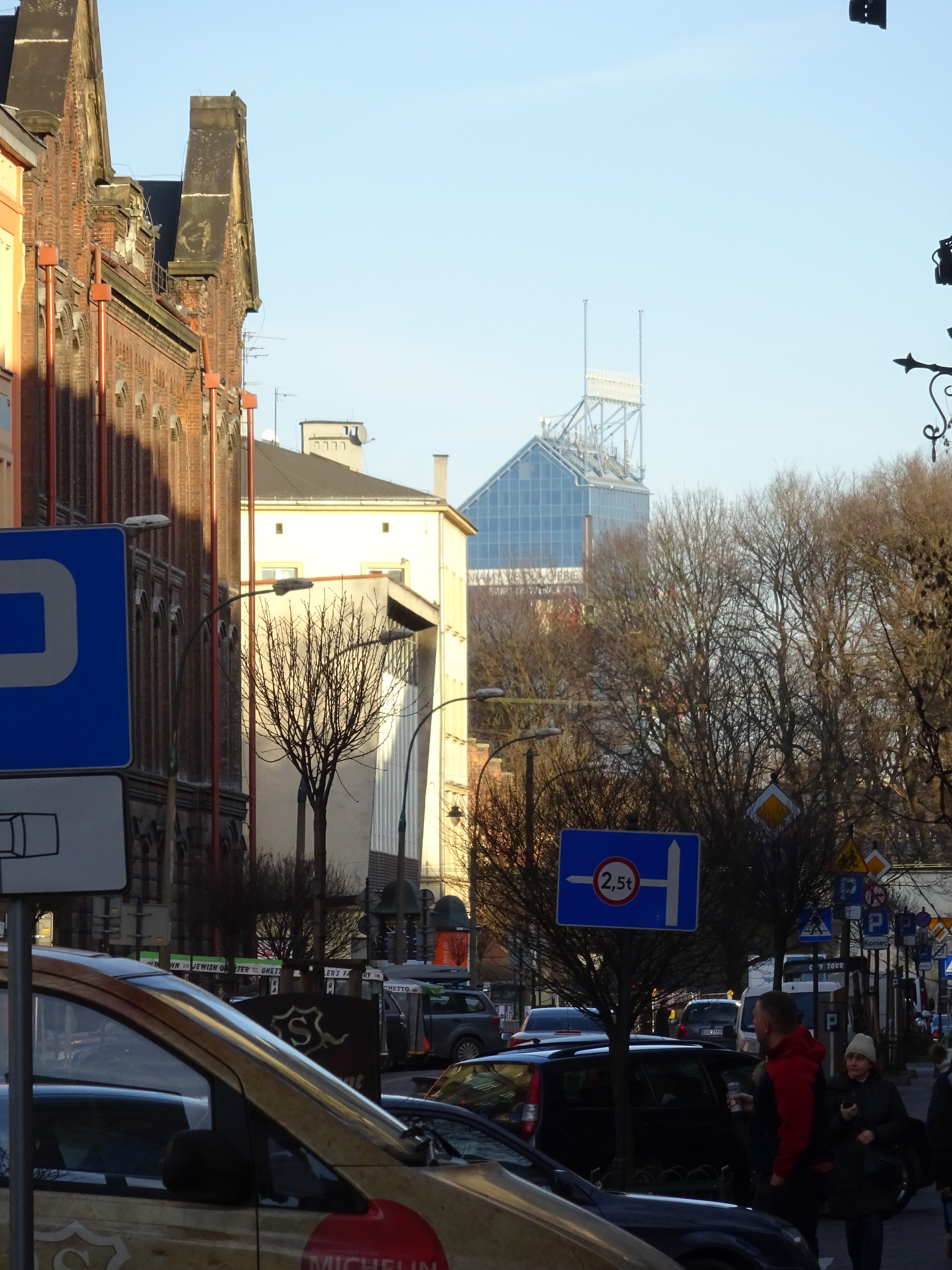
View from Miodowa Street

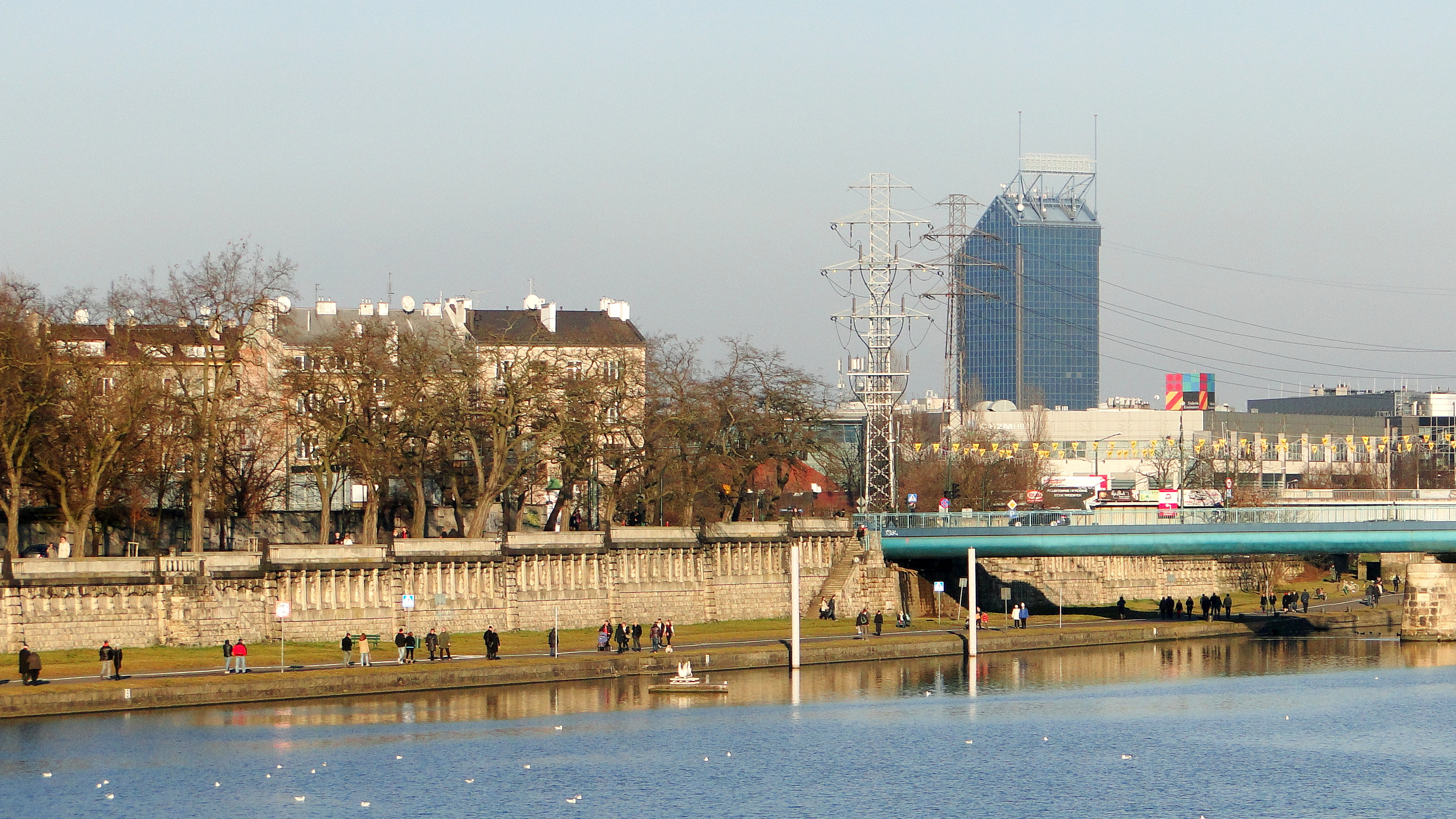
View from the Vistula Boulevards

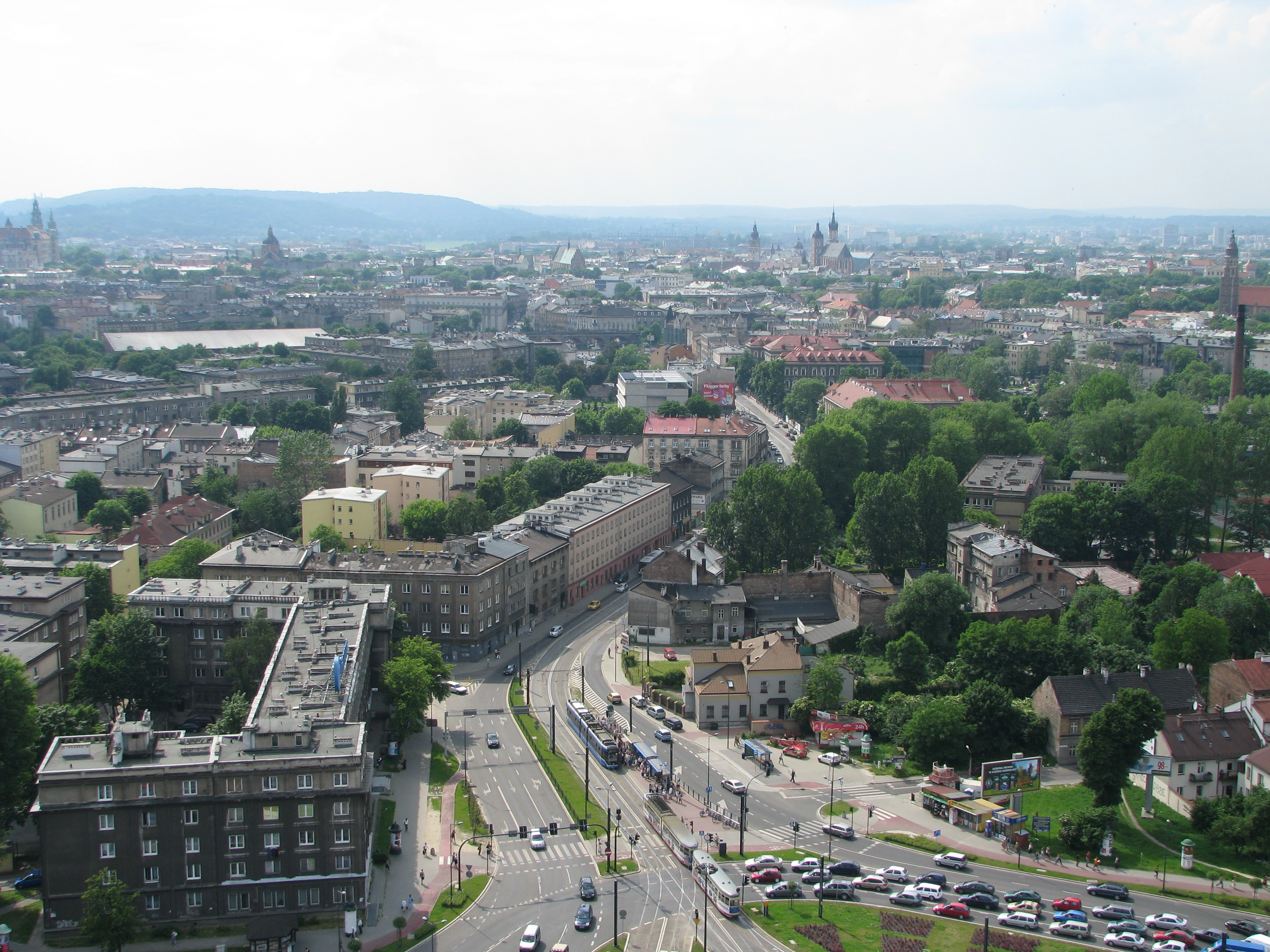
View from the skyscraper of the Old Town

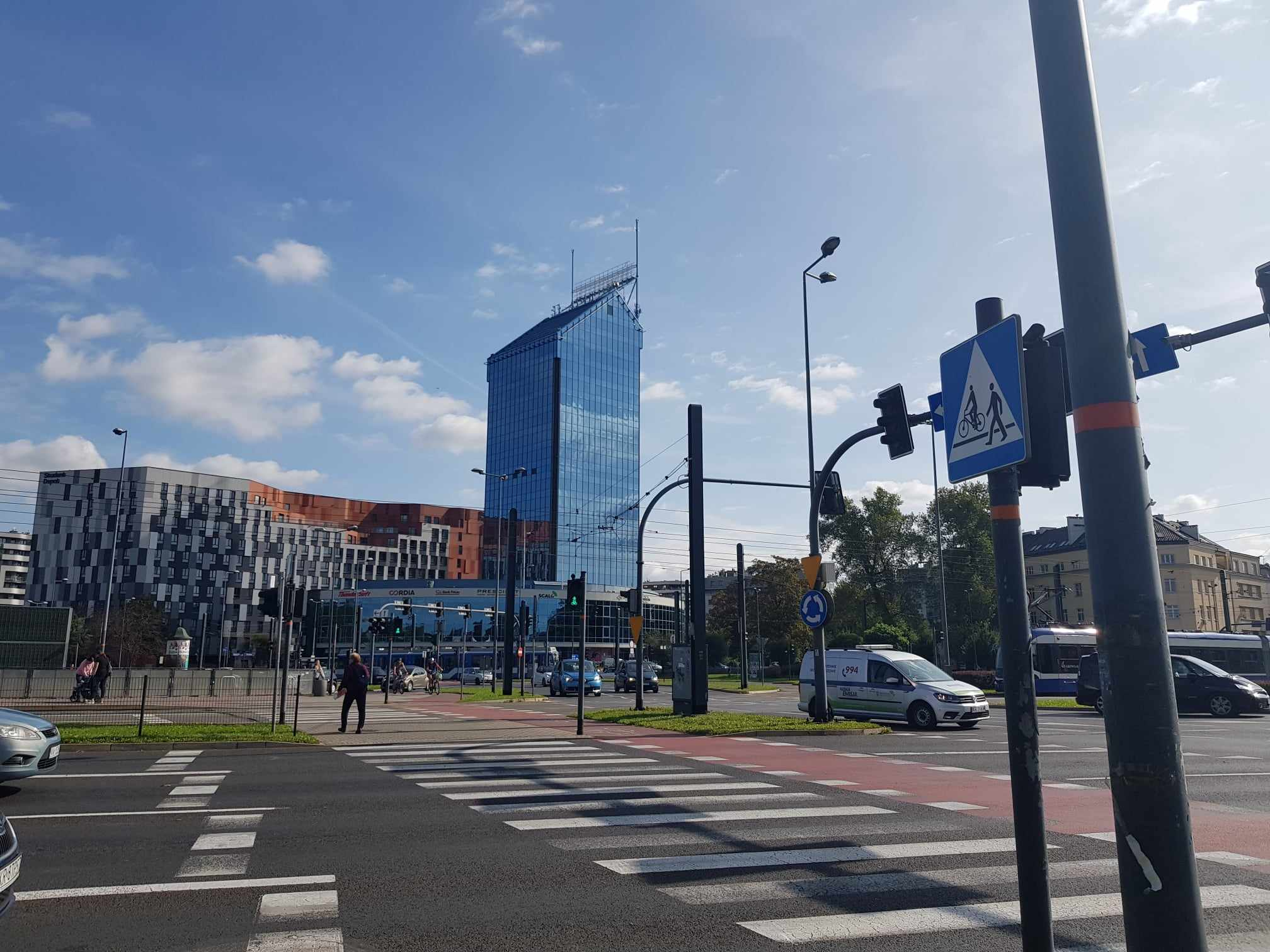
Blue whiting visible from Grzegórzeckie Roundabout
