= K1-class gunboat =

Class overview
- Name: K1 class
- Preceded by: none
- Succeeded by: K1 class
- Planned: 4
- Cancelled: 4

General characteristics
- Type: Gunboat
- Displacement: Designed: 1,600 t (1,600 long tons; 1,800 short tons); Full load: 1,890 t (1,860 long tons; 2,080 short tons)
- Length: 82.5 m (270 ft 8 in)
- Beam: 11.4 m (37 ft 5 in)
- Draft: 3.38 m (11 ft 1 in)
- Installed power: 4,600 PS (4,537 ihp)
- Propulsion: 2 × triple-expansion steam engines; 2 × screw propellers
- Speed: Designed: 18.5 knots (34.3 km/h)
- Range: 3,000 nmi (6,000 km) at 12 knots (22 km/h)
- Armament: 4 × 10.5 cm L/65 guns; 2 × 3.7 cm L/83 Flak guns; 4 × heavy machine guns

The K1 class was a type of gunboat designed by the German Kriegsmarine before World War II. The class was to have comprised four ships, which had been ordered under the provisional names K1, K2, K3, and K4. The four ships were ordered in November 1938, and were scheduled to have been completed by early 1942. However, the contracts for the four ships were canceled on 19 September 1939, two weeks after the start of World War II.

== Design ==
In the mid-1930s, particularly after the Nazi party came to power in 1933 and signed the Anglo-German Naval Agreement in 1935, the Reichsmarine (after 1935 the Kriegsmarine) began to consider a major naval construction program. Various elements in the German navy and government favored different priorities, ranging from a large battle fleet like the Imperial-era High Seas Fleet to a force of long-range commerce raiders. The K1 design was prepared in 1938, while the discussions that resulted in the adoption of Plan Z in January 1939 were still on-going.

=== General characteristics and machinery ===
The K1-class gunboats were 79 m (259 ft 2 in) long at the waterline, and 82.5 m (270 ft 8 in) long overall. The ships had a beam of 11.4 m (37 ft 5 in), a draft of 3.38 m (11 ft 1 in), and a displacement of 1,600 metric tons (1,575 long tons; 1,764 short tons) as designed, 1,390 long tons (1,410 t) standard displacement, and up to 1,890 long tons (1,920 t) at full load displacement. The ships were of steel construction, and their hulls would have been divided into eleven watertight compartments.

The ships were to have used a pair of 4-cylinder, triple-expansion engines that drove a pair of screw propellers. The number and type of boilers that would have provided steam to the engines is unknown, but they would have been vented through a pair of funnels. The engines were rated to provide 4,600 metric horsepower (4,500 ihp), which would have given the ships a top speed of 18.5 knots (34.3 km/h; 21.3 mph). At a more economical speed of 12 knots (22 km/h; 14 mph), they would have had a cruising radius of 3,000 nautical miles (6,000 km). The ships were designed to carry 176 tons of fuel oil.

=== Armament ===
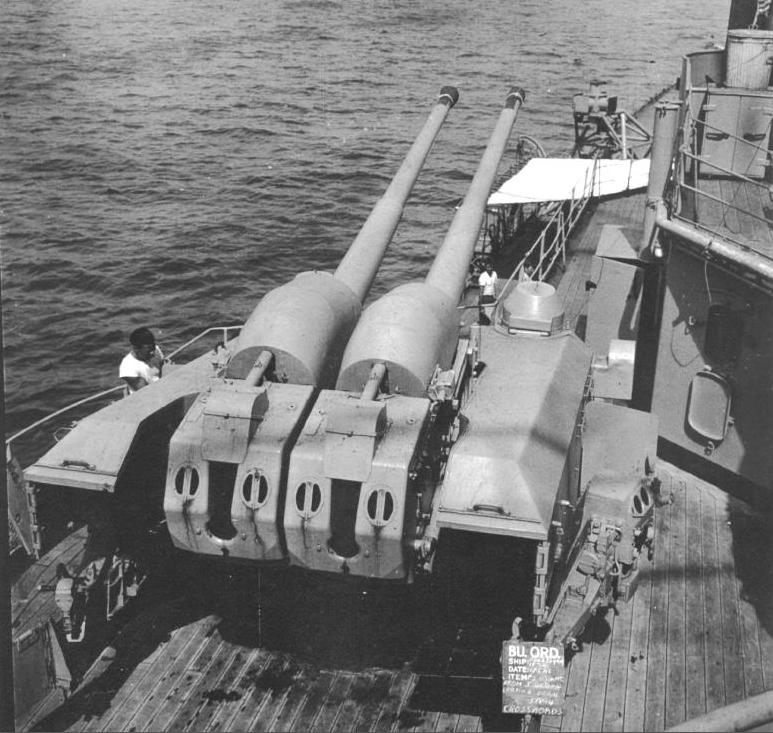
A 10.6 cm L/65 twin mount of the type that would have been carried aboard the K1 class

The K1-class ships primary armament consisted of four 10.5 cm (4.1 in) L/65 quick-firing guns (Note: "L/65" denotes the length of the gun, in terms of the diameter of the barrel. This gun was 65 calibers, meaning the gun was 65 times as long as it is in diameter; in this case, it was 6.825 meters in length) in two twin-turrets, one fore and one aft of the superstructure. The 10.5 cm guns fired two types of projectiles: a 58.4 kg (129 lb) high explosive shell and a 51.8 kg (114 lb) incendiary round. Both types of ammunition used a single propellant charge: the 11.46 kg (25.3 lb) RPC/32 charge. The guns could elevate to 80 degrees, and could hit targets flying at 12,500 m (13,700 yd). When the guns were used to engage surface targets, they could hit targets 17,700 m (19,400 yd) away, at an elevation of 45 degrees.

The ships were also armed with two 3.7 cm (1.5 in) L/83 Flak guns, and four heavy machine guns. The 3.7 cm guns fired 0.742 kg (1.64 lb) high-explosive shells at a rate of fire of about 30 rounds per minute, and a muzzle velocity of 1,000 m/s (3,300 ft/s). The guns could elevate to 85 degrees and hit targets flying at 6,800 m (7,400 yd), although the tracers were limited to 4,800 m (5,200 yd).

== Construction and cancellation ==
The four ships were ordered on 11 November 1938, at the cost of 6 million Reichsmarks apiece. K1 was planned to have been completed on 20 May 1941; K2 was to have followed on 15 September. K3 was to be completed by 15 January 1942, and K4, the final ship of the class, was to be completed a month later on 14 February. However, the outbreak of World War II in early September 1939 exacerbated the already fraught state of the German economy. The country had embarked on a massive rearmament program in the years after the Nazis rose to power, which included the Heer (Army) and Luftwaffe (Air Force), all of which competed for scarce resources, especially high-grade steel. The start of war meant that construction priorities were shifted away from less critical projects to focus Germany's limited resources on projects that might influence the outcome of the war. As a result, the K1 class was canceled on 19 September 1939.
