= KL =

KL, kL, kl, or kl. may refer to:

== Businesses and organizations ==
- KLM, a Dutch airline (IATA airline designator KL)
- Koninklijke Landmacht, the Royal Netherlands Army
- Kvenna Listin ("Women's List"), a political party in Iceland
- KL FM, a Malay language radio station

== Language ==
- Kalaallisut language (ISO 639 alpha-2 language code "kl")
- Kl (digraph), used in the Zulu language to write /kʟ̥ʼ/ or /kxʼ/

== Places ==
- Kaiserslautern, Germany (license plate code KL)
- Kerala, India (ISO 3166-2:IN sub-code KL)
- Kirkland Lake, Ontario, Canada
- Kowloon, Hong Kong
- Kuala Lumpur, Malaysia

== Science, technology, and mathematics ==
- KL engine, version of the Mazda K engine
- Klepton (kl.), a type of species in zoology
- Kiloliter (kL), a unit of volume
- Kullback–Leibler divergence in mathematics
- KL (gene), a gene which encodes the klotho enzyme in humans

== Other uses ==
- Jeep Cherokee (KL)
- Konzentrationslager, or concentration camp, abbreviated KZ or KL
- KL: A History of the Nazi Concentration Camps, a book by Nikolaus Wachsmann

== See also ==
- KL Gangster, a 2011 Malaysian action film
- K1 (disambiguation)
- KI (disambiguation)
