= Unity Tower =

High-rise tower in Kraków, Poland

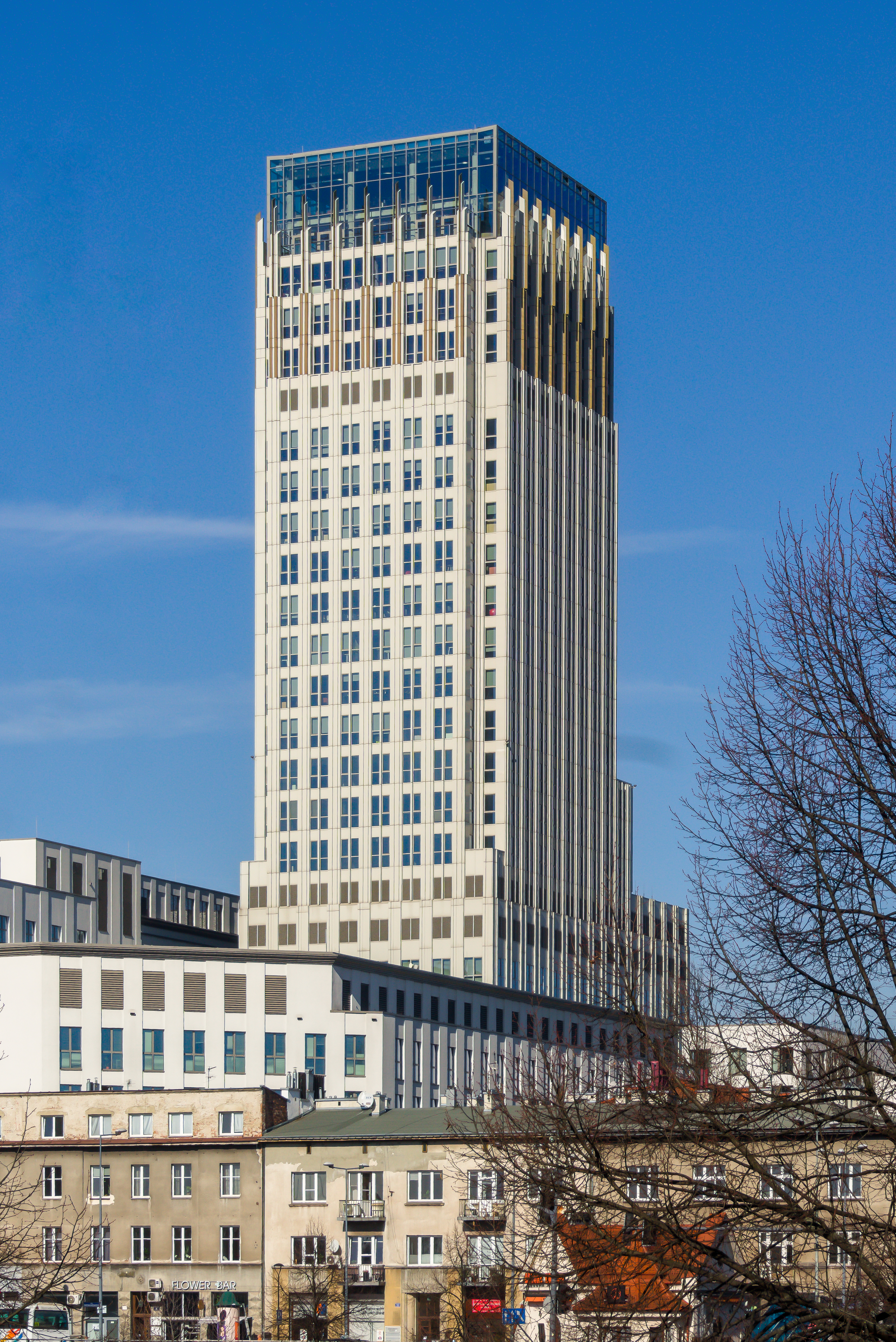
- Unity Tower (2026)

- Location within Poland

General information
- Status: Completed
- Type: Headquarters of the Main Technical Organization
- Location: 16-24 Lubomirskiego Street, Kraków, Poland
- Coordinates: 50°04′05″N 19°57′28″E
- Construction started: 1975–1979 (original); 30 March 2016
- Completed: June 2019
- Owner: TreiMorfa

Height
- Roof: 102.5 m (336 ft)

Technical details
- Floor count: 27

Design and construction
- Architects: Zdzisław Arct, Ewa Dworzak, Ludwik Konior and Krzysztof Leśnodorski (original)
- Architecture firm: DDJM Biuro Architektoniczne (rebuild)
- Main contractor: Mostostal (original); Strabag (rebuild)

Website
- www.unitycentre.pl

Unity Tower (commonly nicknamed the Skeletor (Polish: Szkieletor [ʂkʲɛˈlɛtɔr]) prior to completion) is a 102.5 metre high-rise building located in Kraków, Poland. Unity Tower is located near the Mogilskie Roundabout (Rondo Mogilskie) and Kraków University of Economics. It is the second-tallest building in Kraków after K1.

Due to the skeletal appearance of the unfinished building from 1970s to 2010s; the building gained the unofficial nickname Skeletor. The construction finally resumed in 2016 and the construction work of Unity Centre was completed on 30 September 2020.

== History ==
Originally, it was intended to become the regional office of the Main Technical Organization (Naczelna Organizacja Techniczna, NOT) and be named the NOT Tower. The construction of the building was started in 1975, but stopped permanently in 1979 because of economic constraints and political unrest which later culminated in the imposition of martial law in Poland in 1981.

Due to the skeletal appearance of the unfinished building, it was dubbed the Skeletor (Polish: Szkieletor).

Investors expressed interest in renovating the building throughout the years. In the 1980s, the building was proposed to house apartments for employees at the Nowa Huta steelworks, and after the fall of communism, a large hotel chain became interested in the facility and wanted to complete the unfinished building, but all these efforts were discouraged by the complicated legal status of the land on which it stood and the high cost of its demolition or adaptation. In 2007, a new plan for the building was put forward, which postulated to increase its height from 92 to as high as 130 meters. German architect Hans Kollhoff was invited to take part in the reconstruction of the building, which was supposed to be completed by the time of UEFA Euro 2012 in Poland and Ukraine. However, the project was rejected by the Provincial Conservation Council on the grounds that the new building was located within a historical urban landscape.

The building was partially owned by TreiMorfa Project. The long debate about its possible future use based on brand new plans was cut short by the courts in December 2011 because of legal improprieties by its new design team.

Austrian engineering company Strabag was given the commission to rebuild. The building's floors were removed and replaced, but the steel frame retained and reused. The exterior architecture was inspired by the Art Deco architecture of the 1920s and 30s. The use of grey stone and the architecture was partially inspired by the Maccabees Building.

In 2018, before the full reconstruction of the building was completed, the ArchDaily architecture website named Szkieletor as one of "History's Most Notorious Unfinished Buildings" alongside the Palace of the Soviets, Siena Cathedral and Ryugyong Hotel.

== Gallery ==
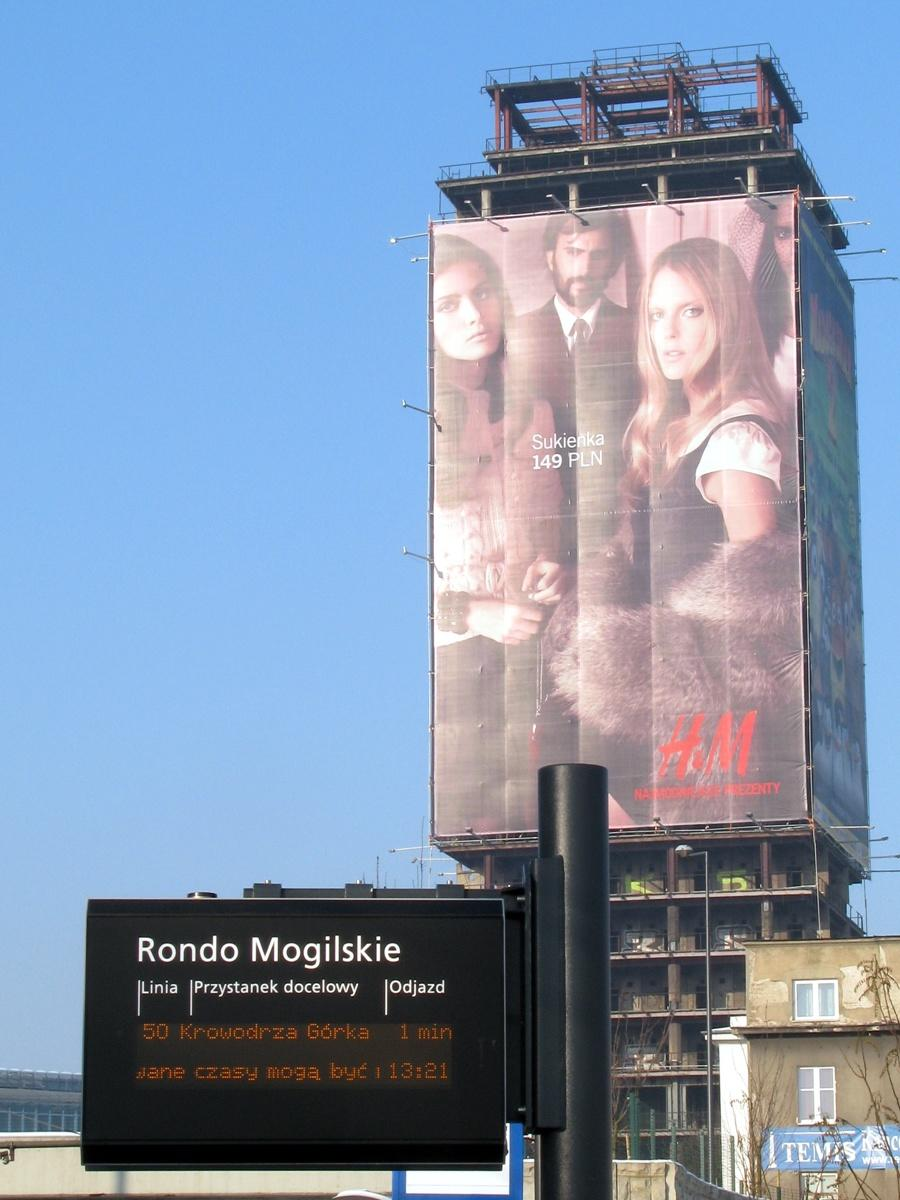
Szkieletor repurposed as a billboard display in 2009

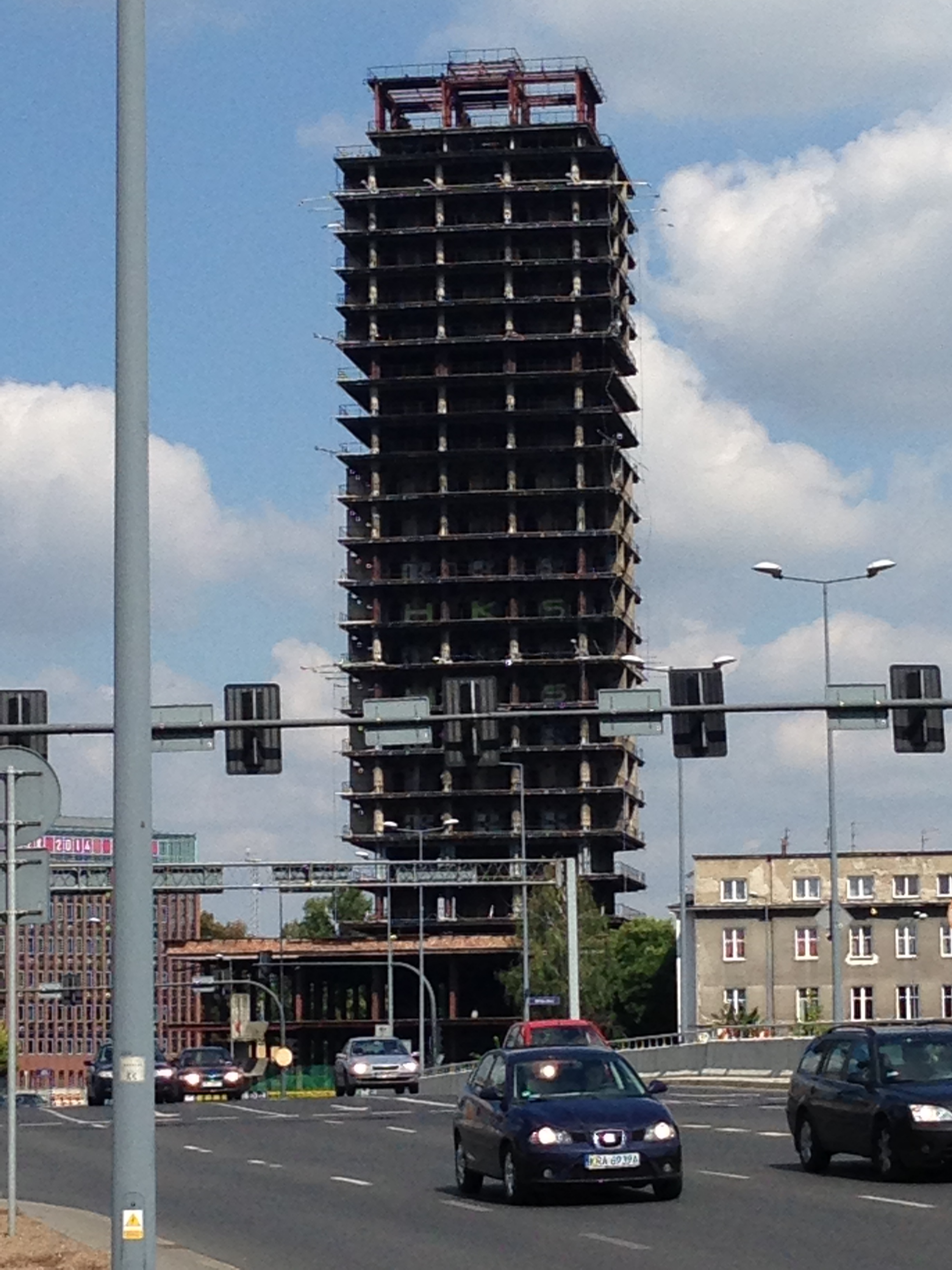
Szkieletor in 2014, with the billboards removed

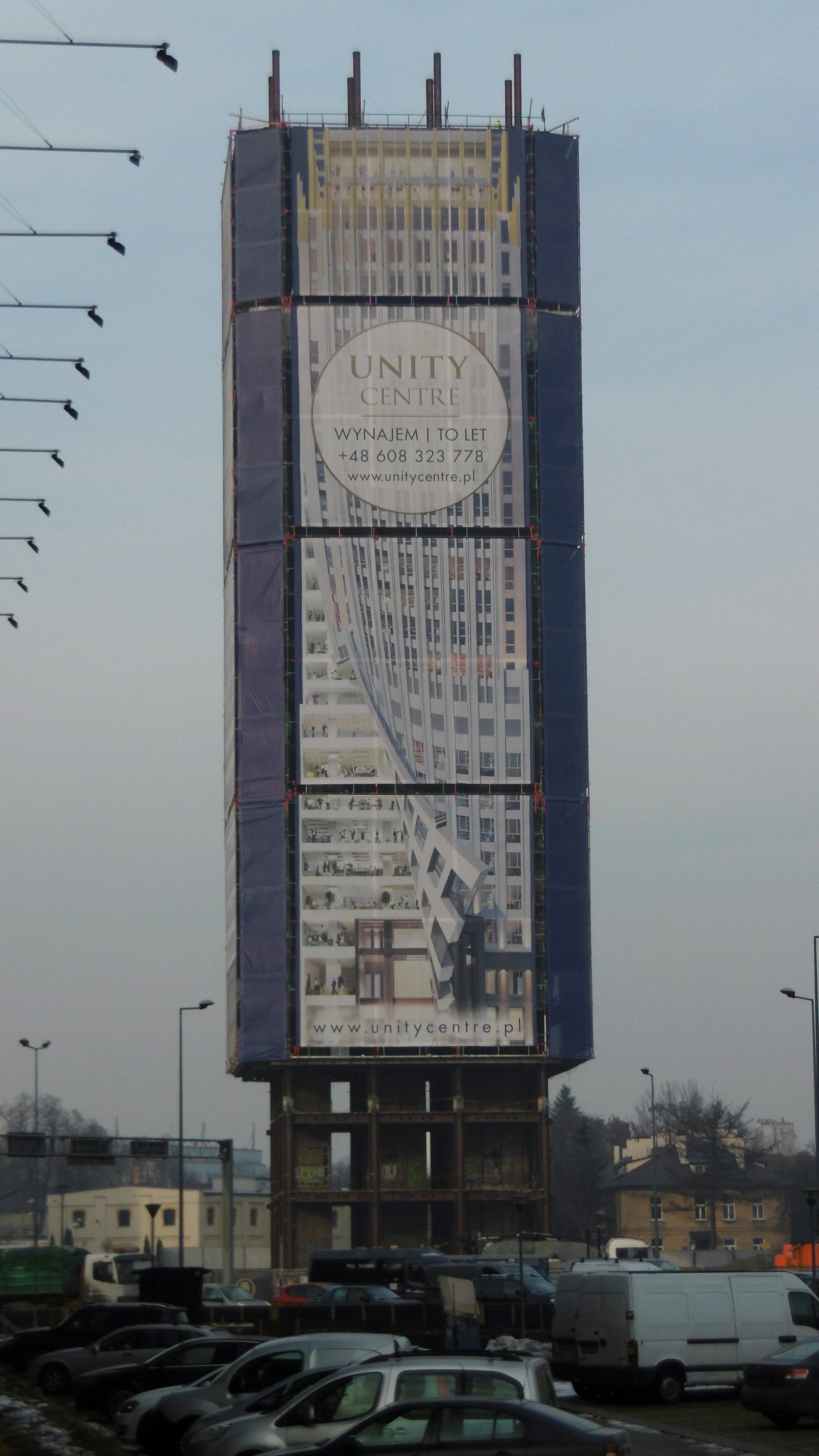
Under construction in January 2017

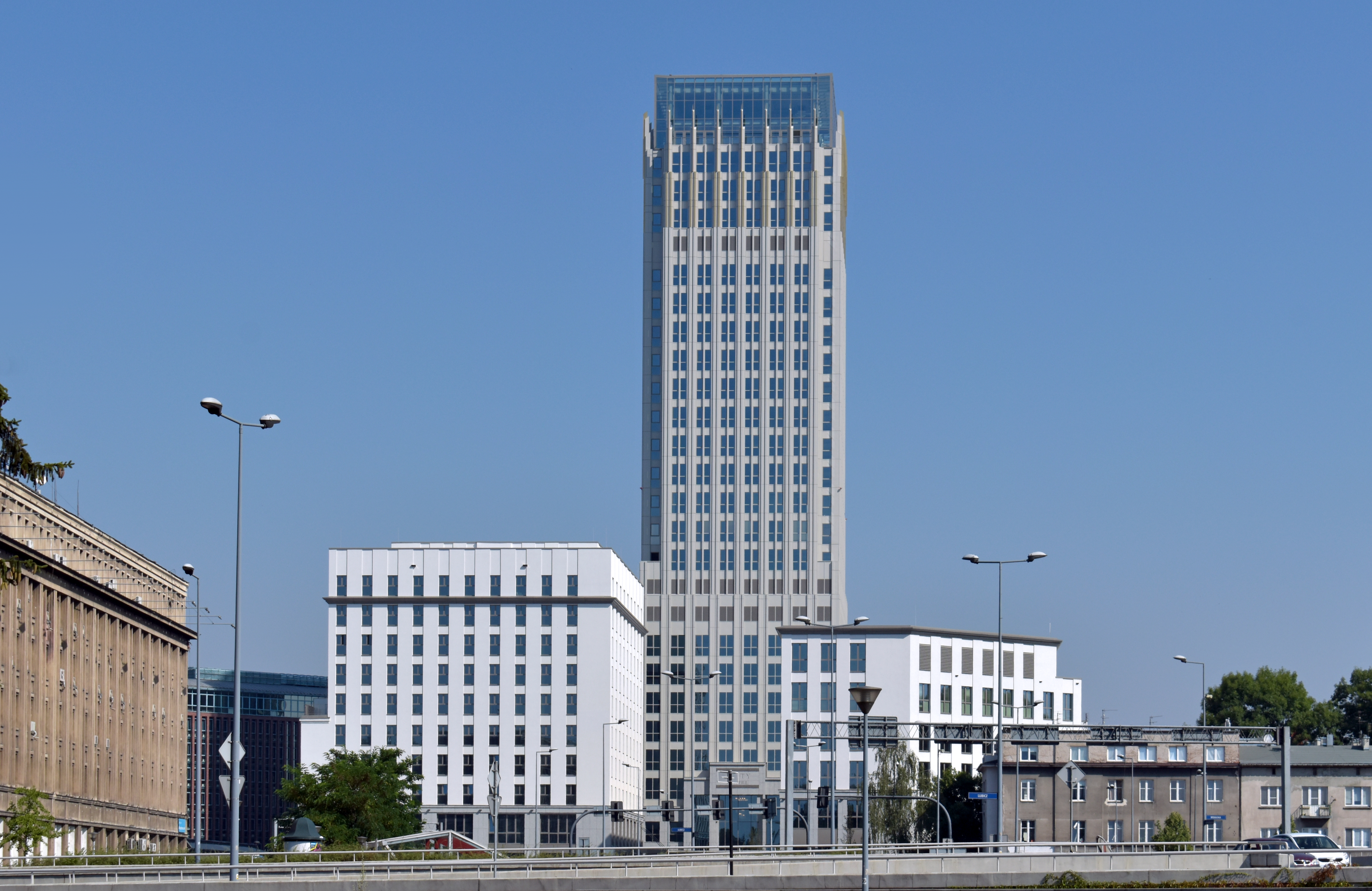
Unity Tower in 2020

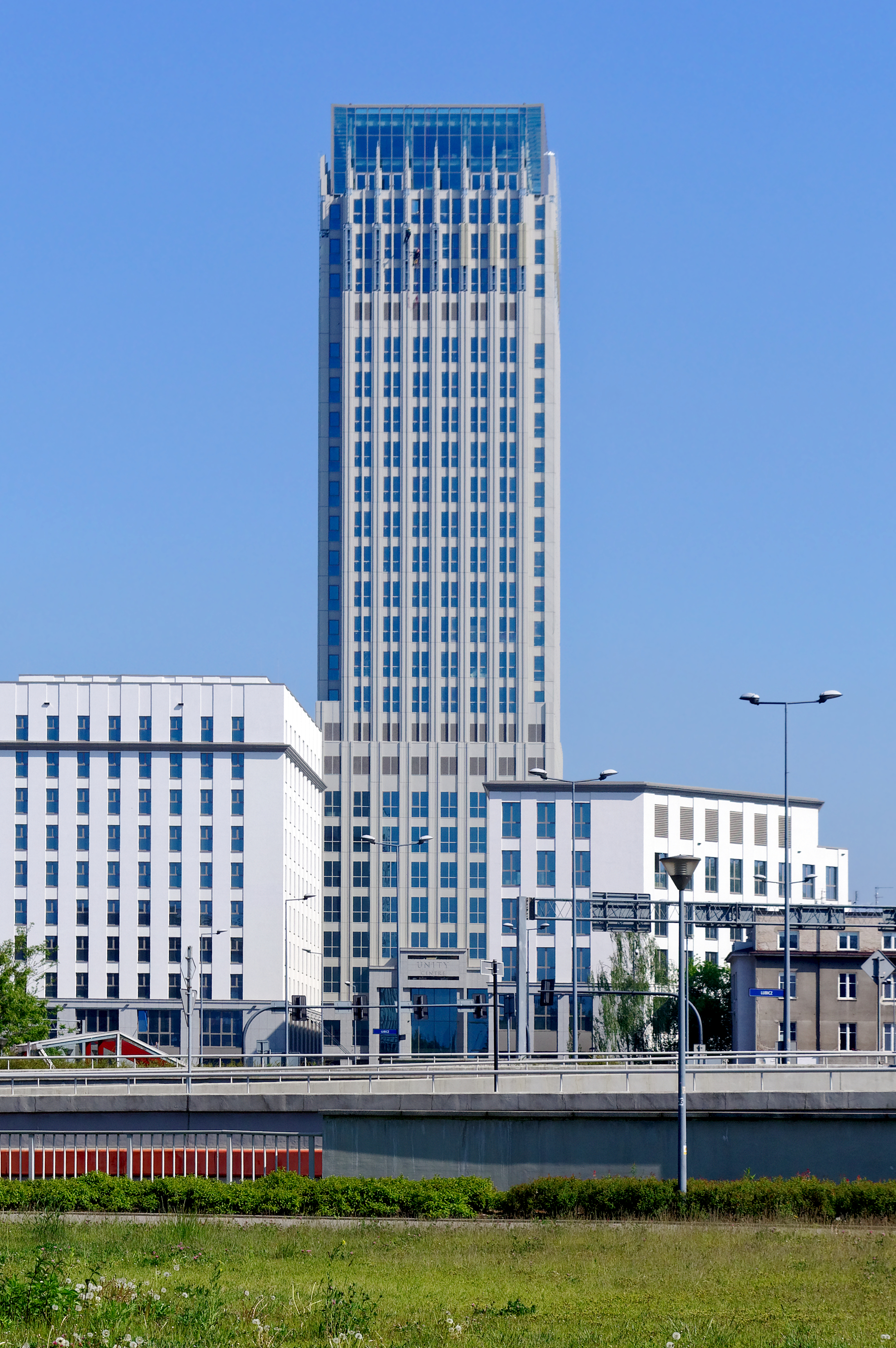
Unity Tower upon completion, 2020

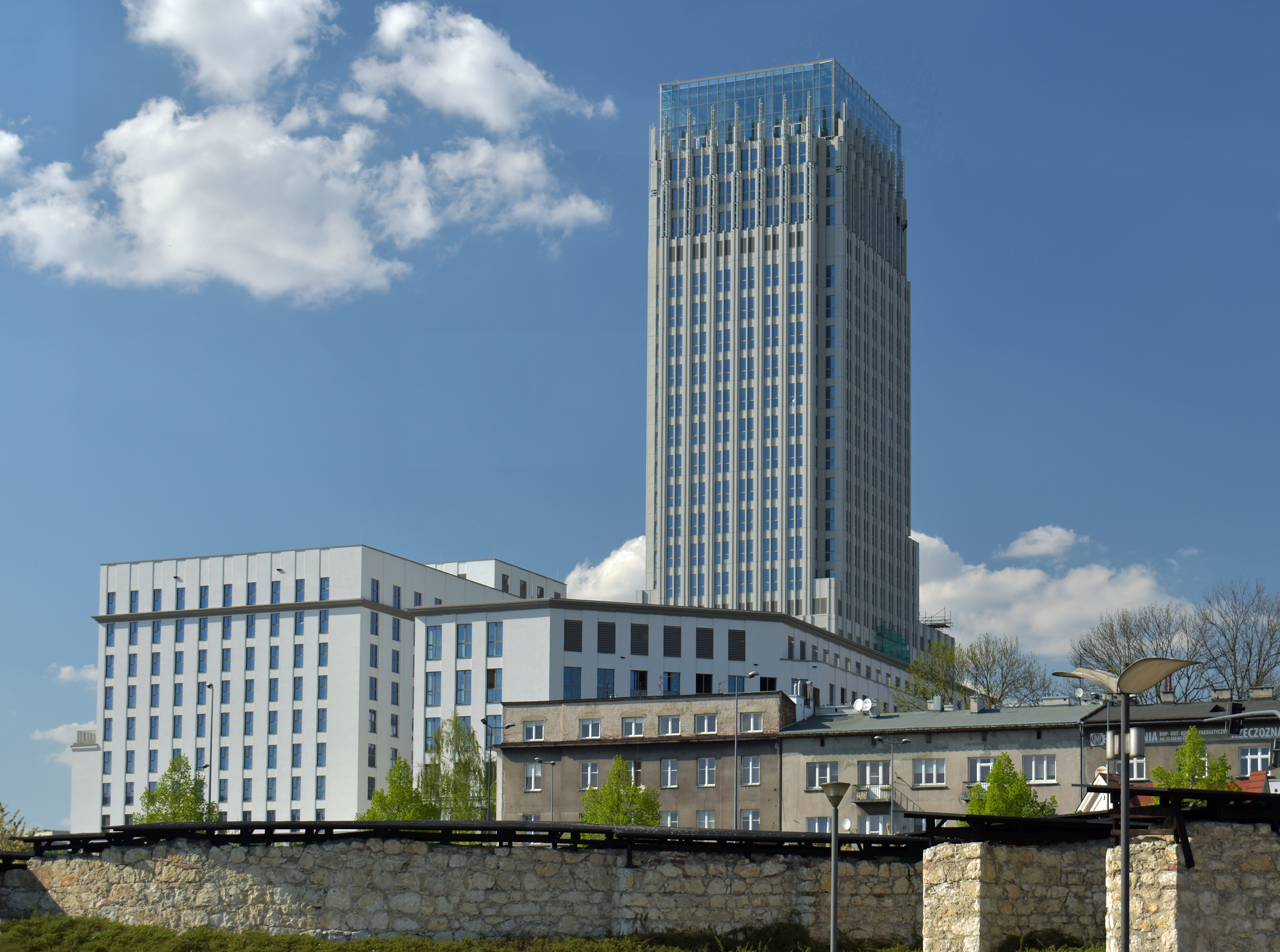
View from the Mogilskie Roundabout

== See also ==
- List of tallest buildings in Poland
- List of tallest buildings in Warsaw
- List of tallest buildings in Katowice
