= IK =

IK or Ik may refer to:

== Businesses and organizations ==
- IK Investment Partners, a European private equity firm
- Imair Airlines (IATA code IK)
- Iparretarrak, a Basque nationalist organization

== Languages ==
- Ik language (ISO 639 alpha-3 ikx), spoken by the Ik people of Uganda
- Inupiaq language (ISO 639 alpha-2), a group of dialects of the Inuit language, spoken in Alaska

== Places ==
- Ik (river), a tributary of the Kama in Bashkortostan and Tatarstan, Russia
- Ik (Berd), a tributary of the Berd in Novosibirsk Oblast, Russia
- Bolshoy Ik, a tributary of the Sakmara in Bashkortostan and Orenburg Oblast, Russia
- Ilm-Kreis, a region in Germany

== Science and technology ==
- IK (gene), a protein-encoding gene
- IK code, a classification of resistance to mechanical impacts
- Internationale Kerze (German for "international candle"), an old photometric unit to measure luminous intensity
- Inverse kinematics, a branch of mechanics

== Other uses ==
- Ik Onkar, a symbol used in the Sikh religion
- Ik people of Uganda
- The Ik, a 1975 play by Colin Higgins and Denis Cannan
