= List of shopping malls in Poland =

The following is a list of shopping malls in Poland.

== List of shopping malls ==
Name	City	Province
Aleja Bielany	Bielany Wrocławskie	Lower Silesian
Galeria Glogovia	Głogów	Lower Silesian
Galeria Nowy Rynek	Jelenia Góra	Lower Silesian
Galeria Sudecka	Jelenia Góra	Lower Silesian
Galeria Twierdza	Kłodzko	Lower Silesian
Galeria Piastow	Legnica	Lower Silesian
Ferio Legnica	Legnica	Lower Silesian
Inbag Luban	Lubań	Lower Silesian
Cuprum Arena	Lubin	Lower Silesian
Galeria Swidnicka	Świdnica	Lower Silesian
Gelaria Victoria	Wałbrzych	Lower Silesian
Magnolia Park	Wrocław	Lower Silesian
Pasaz Grundwaldzki	Wrocław	Lower Silesian
Wroclavia	Wrocław	Lower Silesian
Galeria Dominikanska	Wrocław	Lower Silesian
Sky Tower Galeria	Wrocław	Lower Silesian
Renoma	Wrocław	Lower Silesian
Arkady	Wrocław	Lower Silesian
Astra	Wrocław	Lower Silesian
Marino Center	Wrocław	Lower Silesian
Centrum Borek	Wrocław	Lower Silesian
Family Point	Wrocław	Lower Silesian
Centrum Korona	Wrocław	Lower Silesian
Ferio Gaj	Wrocław	Lower Silesian
Tarasy Grabiszynska	Wrocław	Lower Silesian
Fashion Outlet	Wrocław	Lower Silesian
Zielone Arkady	Bydgoszcz	Kuyavian-Pomeranian
Focus Centrum	Bydgoszcz	Kuyavian-Pomeranian
Galeria Pomorska	Bydgoszcz	Kuyavian-Pomeranian
Centrum Rondo	Bydgoszcz	Kuyavian-Pomeranian
Bydgoskie Centrum Finansowe	Bydgoszcz	Kuyavian-Pomeranian
Alfa Centrum	Grudziądz	Kuyavian-Pomeranian
Stara Kuznia	Grudziądz	Kuyavian-Pomeranian
Galeria Solna	Inowrocław	Kuyavian-Pomeranian
Torun Plaza	Toruń	Kuyavian-Pomeranian
Atrium Copernicus	Toruń	Kuyavian-Pomeranian
Centrum Nowe Bielawy	Toruń	Kuyavian-Pomeranian
Wzorcownia	Włocławek	Kuyavian-Pomeranian
Galeria Bawełnianka	Bełchatów	Łódź
Galeria Olimpia	Bełchatów	Łódź
Manufaktura	Łódź	Łódź
Port Lodz	Łódź	Łódź
Sukcesja	Łódź	Łódź
Galeria Lodzka	Łódź	Łódź
Pasaż Łódzki	Łódź	Łódź
Centrum Przybyszewskiego	Łódź	Łódź
Focus Mall	Piotrków Trybunalski	Łódź
Ptak Outlet	Rzgów	Łódź
Dekada	Sieradrz	Łódź
Galeria Tomaszów	Tomaszów Mazowiecki	Łódź
Centrum Rywal	Biała Podlaska	Lublin
Lublin Plaza	Lublin	Lublin
Galeria Olimp	Lublin	Lublin
VIVO! Tarasy Zamkowe	Lublin	Lublin
Felicity Lublin	Lublin	Lublin
Centrum Gala	Lublin	Lublin
Tomasza Zana	Lublin	Lublin
SKENDE	Lublin	Lublin
Galeria Lubelska	Lublin	Lublin
Galeria Twierdza	Lublin	Lublin
Revia Park	Lublin	Lublin
Centrum Feeria	Gorzów Wielkopolski	Lubusz
Centrum Panorama	Gorzów Wielkopolski	Lubusz
Galeria Askana	Gorzów Wielkopolski	Lubusz
NoVa Park	Gorzów Wielkopolski	Lubusz
Focus Mall	Zielona Góra	Lubusz
Bonarka City Center	Kraków	Lesser Poland
Galeria Bronowice	Kraków	Lesser Poland
Galeria Kazimierz	Kraków	Lesser Poland
Galeria Krakowska	Kraków	Lesser Poland
Serenada	Kraków	Lesser Poland
Kings Square	Kraków	Lesser Poland
Krokus	Kraków	Lesser Poland
Park Handlowy Zakopianka	Kraków	Lesser Poland
Centrum Czyżyny	Kraków	Lesser Poland
Factory Krakow	Kraków	Lesser Poland
Gallery Plaza	Kraków	Lesser Poland
Trzy Korony	Nowy Sącz	Lesser Poland
Centrum Golabkowice	Nowy Sącz	Lesser Poland
Europe II Plaza	Nowy Sącz	Lesser Poland
Galleria Niwa	Oświęcim	Lesser Poland
Galeria Tarnovia	Tarnów	Lesser Poland
Gemini Park	Tarnów	Lesser Poland
Centrum Echo	Tarnów	Lesser Poland
MMG Centers	Ciechanów	Masovian
Gondola Legionowo	Legionowo	Masovian
Galeria Łomianki	Łomianki	Masovian
Centrum HIT	Nowy Dwór Mazowiecki	Masovian
Galeria Bursztynowa	Ostrołęka	Masovian
Designer Outlet Warszawa	Piaseczno	Masovian
Galeria Maozvia	Płock	Masovian
Galeria Mosty	Płock	Masovian
Galeria Wisła	Płock	Masovian
Nowa Stacja	Pruszków	Masovian
Galeria Słoneczna	Radom	Masovian
Centrum Echo	Radom	Masovian
Atrium Gama	Radom	Masovian
Galeria Siedlce	Siedlce	Masovian
Westfield Arkadia	Warsaw	Masovian
Atrium Promenada	Warsaw	Masovian
Blue City	Warsaw	Masovian
Galeria Mlociny	Warsaw	Masovian
Westfield Mokotow	Warsaw	Masovian
Galeria Północna	Warsaw	Masovian
Złote Tarasy	Warsaw	Masovian
Fashion House Klif	Warsaw	Masovian
Galeria Wileńska	Warsaw	Masovian
Wola Park	Warsaw	Masovian
Atrium Reduta	Warsaw	Masovian
Sadyba Best Mall	Warsaw	Masovian
Galeria Renova	Warsaw	Masovian
Galeria Ursynow	Warsaw	Masovian
Jupiter Center Galeria	Warsaw	Masovian
Atrium Targówek	Warsaw	Masovian
Centrum Janki	Warsaw	Masovian
Centrum Łopuszańska 22	Warsaw	Masovian
Galeria Panorama	Warsaw	Masovian
Galeria Ken	Warsaw	Masovian
Galeria Wolomin	Wołomin	Masovian
Odrzańskie Ogrody	Kędzierzyn-Koźle	Opole
Galeria Miodowa	Kluczbork	Opole
Galeria Dekada	Nysa	Opole
Solaris Center	Opole	Opole
Centrum Karolinka	Opole	Opole
Galeria Opolanin	Opole	Opole
Turawa Park	Opole	Opole
Galeria Debicka	Dębica	Subcarpathian
VIVO	Krosno	Subcarpathian
Galeria Navigator	Mielec	Subcarpathian
Galeria Sanowa	Przemyśl	Subcarpathian
Millenium Hall	Rzeszów	Subcarpathian
Galeria Rzeszow	Rzeszów	Subcarpathian
Plaza Rzeszow	Rzeszów	Subcarpathian
Outlet Graffica	Rzeszów	Subcarpathian
Pasaż Rzeszow	Rzeszów	Subcarpathian
VIVO	Stalowa Wola	Subcarpathian
Alfa Centrum	Białystok	Podlaskie
Galeria Jurowiecka	Białystok	Podlaskie
Galeria Zielone Wzgorze	Białystok	Podlaskie
Atrium Biala	Białystok	Podlaskie
Outlet Center	Białystok	Podlaskie
Veneda	Łomża	Podlaskie
Suwalki Plaza	Suwałki	Podlaskie
Forum Gdańsk	Gdańsk	Pomeranian
Galeria Zaspa	Gdańsk	Pomeranian
Matarnia Retail Park	Gdańsk	Pomeranian
Alfa Centrum	Gdańsk	Pomeranian
Galeria Baltycka	Gdańsk	Pomeranian
Galeria Chelm	Gdańsk	Pomeranian
Galeria Madison	Gdańsk	Pomeranian
Galeria Metropolia	Gdańsk	Pomeranian
Galeria Morena	Gdańsk	Pomeranian
Galeria Przymorze	Gdańsk	Pomeranian
Centrum Riviera	Gdynia	Pomeranian
BATORY	Gdynia	Pomeranian
Galeria Klif	Gdynia	Pomeranian
Centrum Liwa	Kwidzyn	Pomeranian
Galeria Rumia	Rumia	Pomeranian
Centrum Jantar	Slupsk	Pomeranian
Galeria Slupsk	Słupsk	Pomeranian
Sopot Centrum	Sopot	Pomeranian
Galeria Neptun	Starogard Gdański	Pomeranian
Galeria Kociewska	Tczew	Pomeranian
Centrum Kaszuby	Wejherowo	Pomeranian
Galeria Sfera	Bielsko-Biała	Silesian
Gemini Park	Bielsko-Biała	Silesian
Sarni Stok	Bielsko-Biała	Silesian
Agora	Bytom	Silesian
Plejada	Bytom	Silesian
AKS Centrum	Chorzów	Silesian
Stara Kablownia	Czechowice-Dziedzice	Silesian
M1 Czeladź	Czeladź	Silesian
Galeria Jurajska	Częstochowa	Silesian
Centrum Pogoria	Dąbrowa Górnicza	Silesian
Centrum Arena	Gliwice	Silesian
Europa Centralna	Gliwice	Silesian
Forum Gliwice	Gliwice	Silesian
Galeria Zdrój	Jastrzębie-Zdrój	Silesian
Galeria Galena	Jaworzno	Silesian
Centrum Libero	Katowice	Silesian
Galeria Katowicka	Katowice	Silesian
Silesia City Center	Katowice	Silesian
Supersam	Katowice	Silesian
3 Stawy	Katowice	Silesian
Belg	Katowice	Silesian
Centrum Zaleze	Katowice	Silesian
Galeria Altus	Katowice	Silesian
Galeria PIK	Mikołów	Silesian
Quick Park	Mysłowice	Silesian
Ruda Śląska Plaza	Ruda Śląska	Silesian
Focus Park	Rybnik	Silesian
Rybnik plaza	Rybnik	Silesian
Galeria Śląska	Rybnik	Silesian
Centrum Atrium	Siemianowice Śląskie	Silesian
Sosnowiec Plaza	Sosnowiec	Silesian
Centrum Plejada	Sosnowiec	Silesian
Designer Outlet	Sosnowiec	Silesian
Atrium Świętochłowice	Świętochłowice	Silesian
Gemini Park	Tychy	Silesian
Galeria Karuzela	Wodzisław Śląski	Silesian
Centrum Platan	Zabrze	Silesian
Galeria Zabrze	Zabrze	Silesian
M1 Zabrze	Zabrze	Silesian
Galeria Echo	Kielce	Świętokrzyskie
Galeria Korona	Kielce	Świętokrzyskie
Centrum Planty	Kielce	Świętokrzyskie
Pasaz Swietokrzysky	Kielce	Świętokrzyskie
Galeria Ostrowiec	Ostrowiec Świętokrzyski	Świętokrzyskie
Hermes	Skarżysko-Kamienna	Świętokrzyskie
Galardia Starachowice	Starachowice	Świętokrzyskie
Ogrody Centrum	Elbląg	Warmian–Masurian
Brama Mazur	Ełk	Warmian–Masurian
Aura Centrum	Olsztyn	Warmian–Masurian
Galeria Warminska	Olsztyn	Warmian–Masurian
Galeria Gniezno	Gniezno	Greater Poland
Galeria Piastova	Gniezno	Greater Poland
Galeria Amber	Kalisz	Greater Poland
Galeria Tęcza	Kalisz	Greater Poland
Galeria Nad Jeziorem	Konin	Greater Poland
Ferio	Konin	Greater Poland
Galeria Leszno	Leszno	Greater Poland
Galeria Ostrovia	Ostrów Wielkopolski	Greater Poland
Atrium Kasztanowa	Piła	Greater Poland
VIVO	Piła	Greater Poland
Avenida	Poznań	Greater Poland
Posnania	Poznań	Greater Poland
Stary Browar	Poznań	Greater Poland
Galeria Malta	Poznań	Greater Poland
King Cross Marcelin	Poznań	Greater Poland
Galeria Pestka	Poznań	Greater Poland
Poznan Plaza	Poznań	Greater Poland
Kupiec Poznanski	Poznań	Greater Poland
Galeria MM	Poznań	Greater Poland
Green Point	Poznań	Greater Poland
Park Franowo	Poznań	Greater Poland
Galeria Polonia	Śrem	Greater Poland
Galeria Hosso	Kołobrzeg	West Pomeranian
Forum Koszalin	Koszalin	West Pomeranian
Galeria Emka	Koszalin	West Pomeranian
Galeria Kosmos	Koszalin	West Pomeranian
Galeria Hosso	Police	West Pomeranian
Corso	Świnoujście	West Pomeranian
Nowy Turzyn	Szczecin	West Pomeranian
Centrum Kupiec	Szczecin	West Pomeranian
Atrium Molo	Szczecin	West Pomeranian
Centrum Sloneczne	Szczecin	West Pomeranian
Galaxy Centrum	Szczecin	West Pomeranian
Galeria Gryf	Szczecin	West Pomeranian
Galeria Kaskada	Szczecin	West Pomeranian
Galeria Turzyn	Szczecin	West Pomeranian
Oulet Park	Szczecin	West Pomeranian
Ster	Szczecin	West Pomeranian
Centrum Aria	Szczecinek	West Pomeranian
Galeria Hosso	Szczecinek	West Pomeranian
