= Real5D =

real5D is a virtual platform for viewing real estate, allowing a user to walk through a property and interact with the environment around them, including other virtual visitors or estate agents.

== History ==
real5D was founded in 2007 by Balazs Farago, a Hungarian real estate developer, and his brothers Daniel and Peter. The company's first customers were European construction and development companies Skanska and TriGránit. In 2012, the founders moved to San Francisco and in July 2012, they raised US$1,200,000 from venture capital firm DoubleRock. The company is now headquartered in Redwood City, California.

== See also ==
- Second Life
