= Bonarka City Center =

Shopping mall in Kraków, Poland

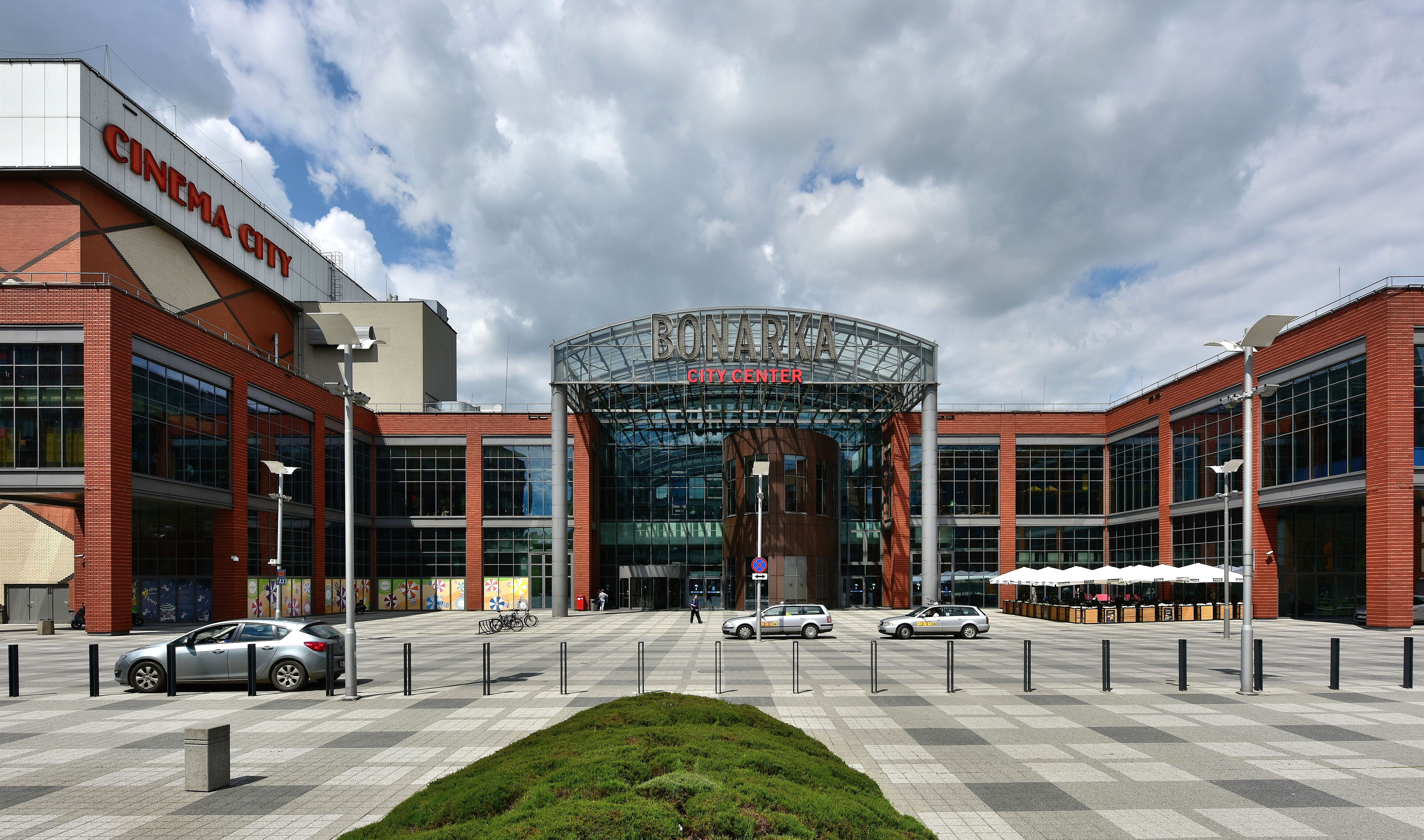
- Main entrance
- Location: Kraków, Poland
- Coordinates: 50°1′41″N 19°57′3″E
- Address: ulica Kamieńskiego 11
- Opened: 21 November 2009
- Developer: TriGranit
- Owner: Rockcastle
- Num. of stores: 267
- Floor area: 76,300 m^{2} (821,000 sq ft)
- Floors: 2
- Parking: 3200 parking bays
- Public transit: Bonarka, Puszkarska, Kamieńskiego, Tischnera bus stops, MPK Kraków
- Website: www.bonarka.com.pl

Bonarka City Center is a shopping mall located in Kraków, Poland, in the district of Podgórze Duchackie. It opened on 21 November 2009. The mall is adjoined by an office complex named Bonarka for Business. It has been undergoing renovation since 2019.

== History ==
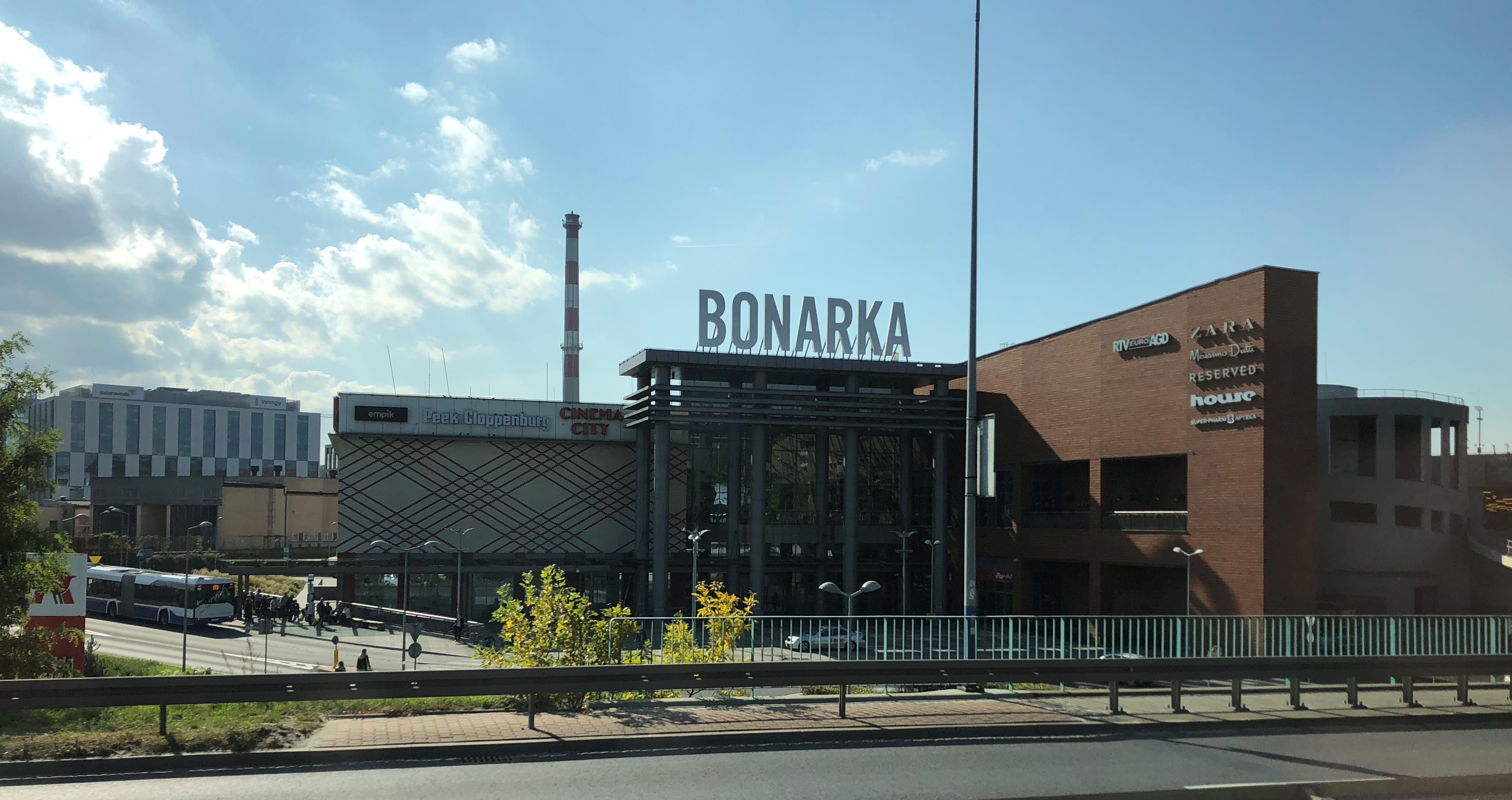
The northern entrance of Bonarka. The historical chimney can be seen behind the building.

The mall is located in the former village of Bonarka. It was built on the site of a former chemical plant which was decommissioned in 2003. Hungarian real estate company TriGranit purchased the abandoned industrial site in 2006 and began construction of the mall after the demolition of all industrial buildings and the removal of chemical residue left over from the plant. In total, recultivation took 14 months and cost the developer 54 million PLN. A single chimney was chosen to remain in the vicinity of the mall as a reminder of the area's industrial history. It now serves as a major local landmark.

In 2016, TriGranit sold the mall to real estate trust NEPI Rockcastle, in a transaction amounting to €360 million.

== Stores and facilities ==
The mall accommodates approximately 267 tenants, including Media Expert, TK Maxx, Cinema City, Lego Store, Primark, and Auchan, which is the anchor tenant. The building is equipped with a three-story parking garage, manual car wash, and charging stations for electric vehicles.

== See also ==
- List of shopping malls in Poland
