= Westfield Arkadia =

Shopping mall in Warsaw, Poland

Coordinates: 52°15′23″N 20°59′2″E

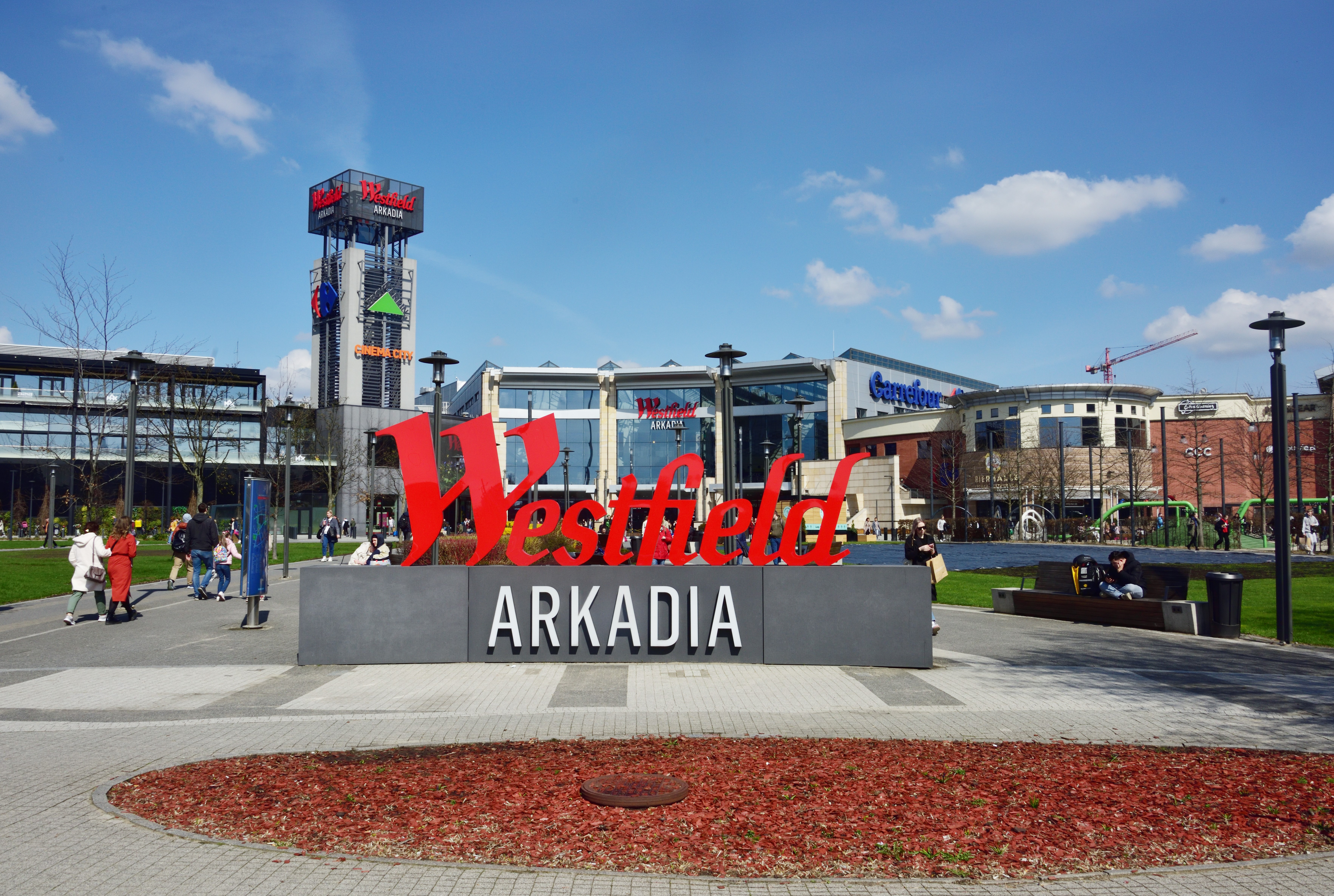
Arkadia shopping center

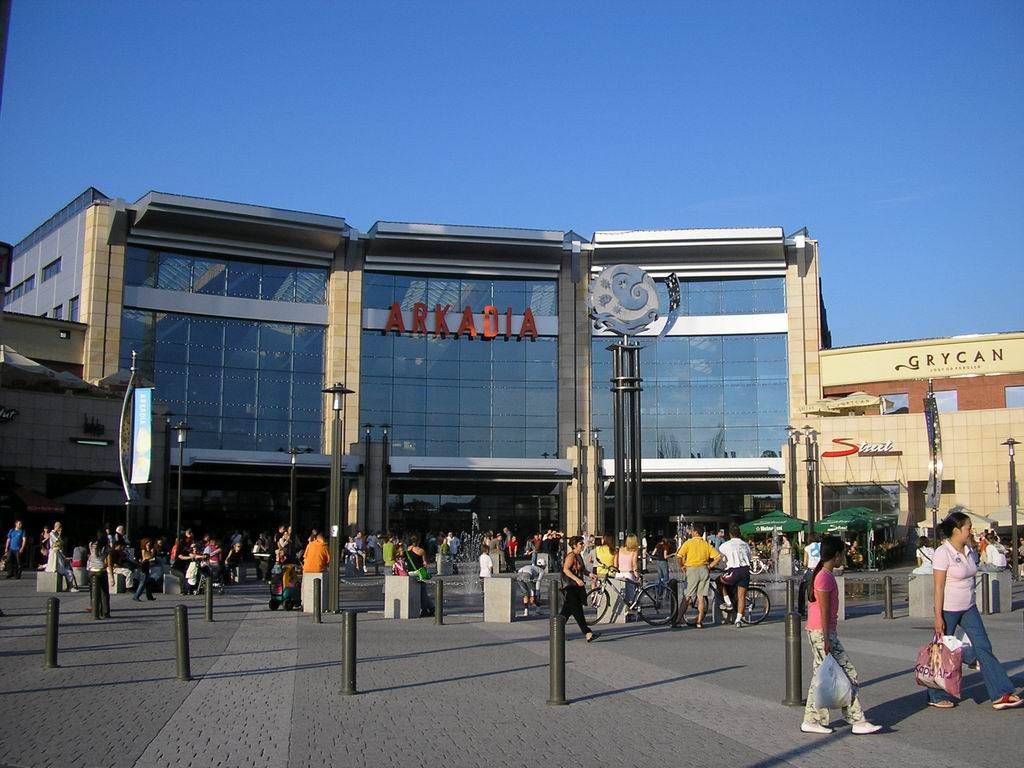
Main entrance

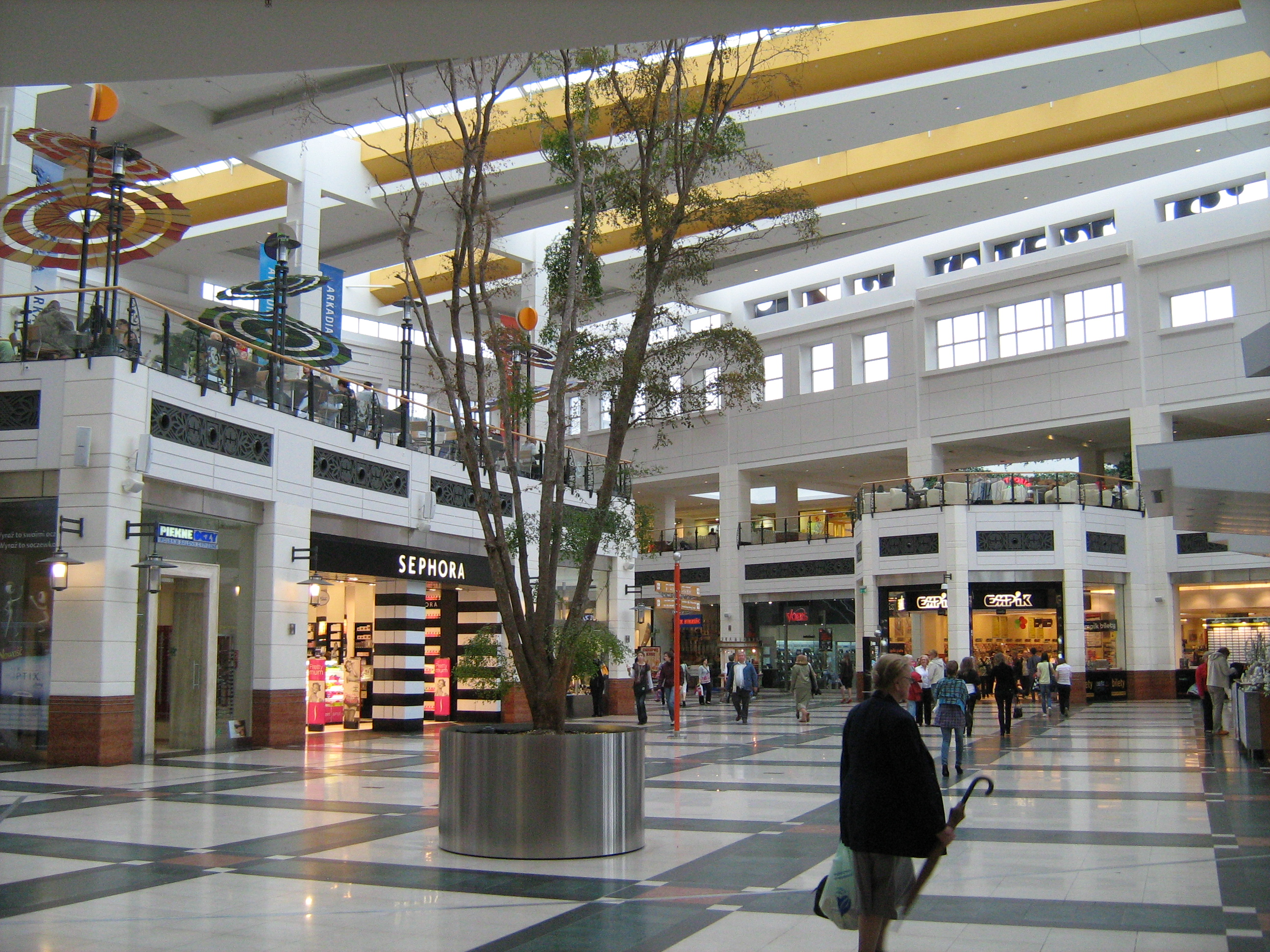
Interior

Westfield Arkadia in Warsaw, Poland is the largest shopping complex in Central Europe (as of 2007). In total it has 287,000 square metres (3,100,000 sq ft) of space, 230 shops, 25 restaurants, and a movie theater. It is owned and operated by Unibail-Rodamco.

It includes the following stores: Carrefour, EMPiK, Leroy Merlin, Saturn, Cinema City, Euro RTV AGD, H&M, Zara and Uniqlo.

Arkadia opened on 20 October 2004 and was developed by BEG Ingenierie Polska and Cefic Polska. The International Council of Shopping Centers awarded it the best shopping mall project in Poland, Shopping Center of the Year in 2004, and the European Shopping Center Award for best mall in Europe in 2006. It was declared Warsaw's most disabled-friendly building by the Warsaw Without Barriers programme and the NGO Association of Friends of Integration (Stowarzyszenie Przyjaciół Integracji).

On 25 September 2019 Arkadia changed its name to Westfield Arkadia.

== See also ==
- List of shopping malls in Poland
