= Galeria Jurajska =

Shopping centre in Częstochowa, Poland

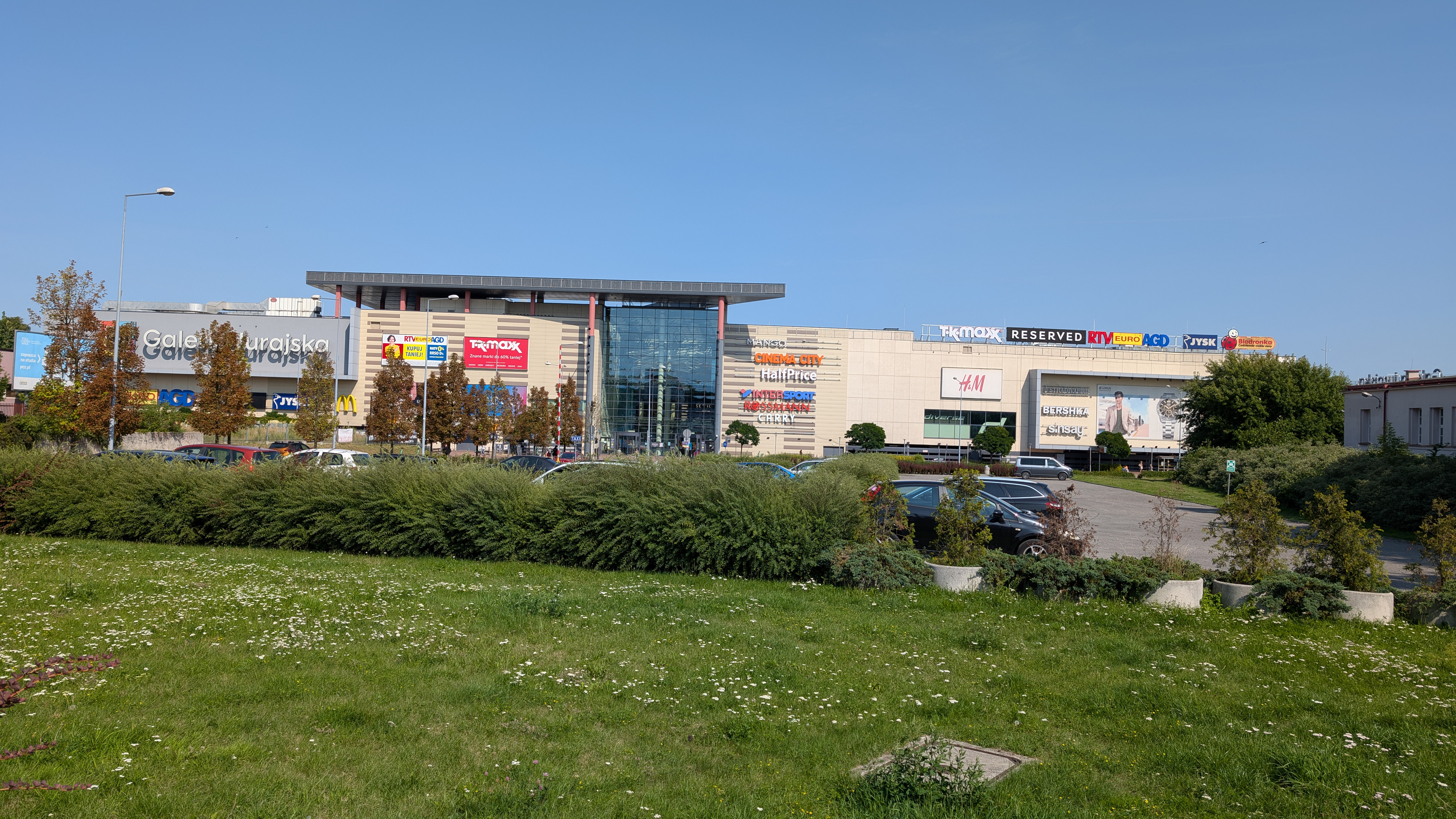
- Interactive map of Galeria Jurajska

General information
- Location: Częstochowa, Poland
- Coordinates: 50°48′27.0″N 19°07′55.0″E
- Opened: 3 October 2009

Website
- https://galeriajurajska.pl

Galeria Jurajska is a shopping centre in Częstochowa, Poland.

== History ==
Opened on 3 October 2009, it was built on the site of two old paper and roller mills of Berka Charles Ginsberg and Kohn, alongside a canal constructed as part of regulation of the river Warta.

In September 2018, a water wall with a mechanical clock opened inside the shopping centre. At an area of 100 m^{2} (1,100 sq ft) and 15 m (49 ft) tall, the water wall was the largest structure of its kind in the world at the time of its opening.

== Gallery ==
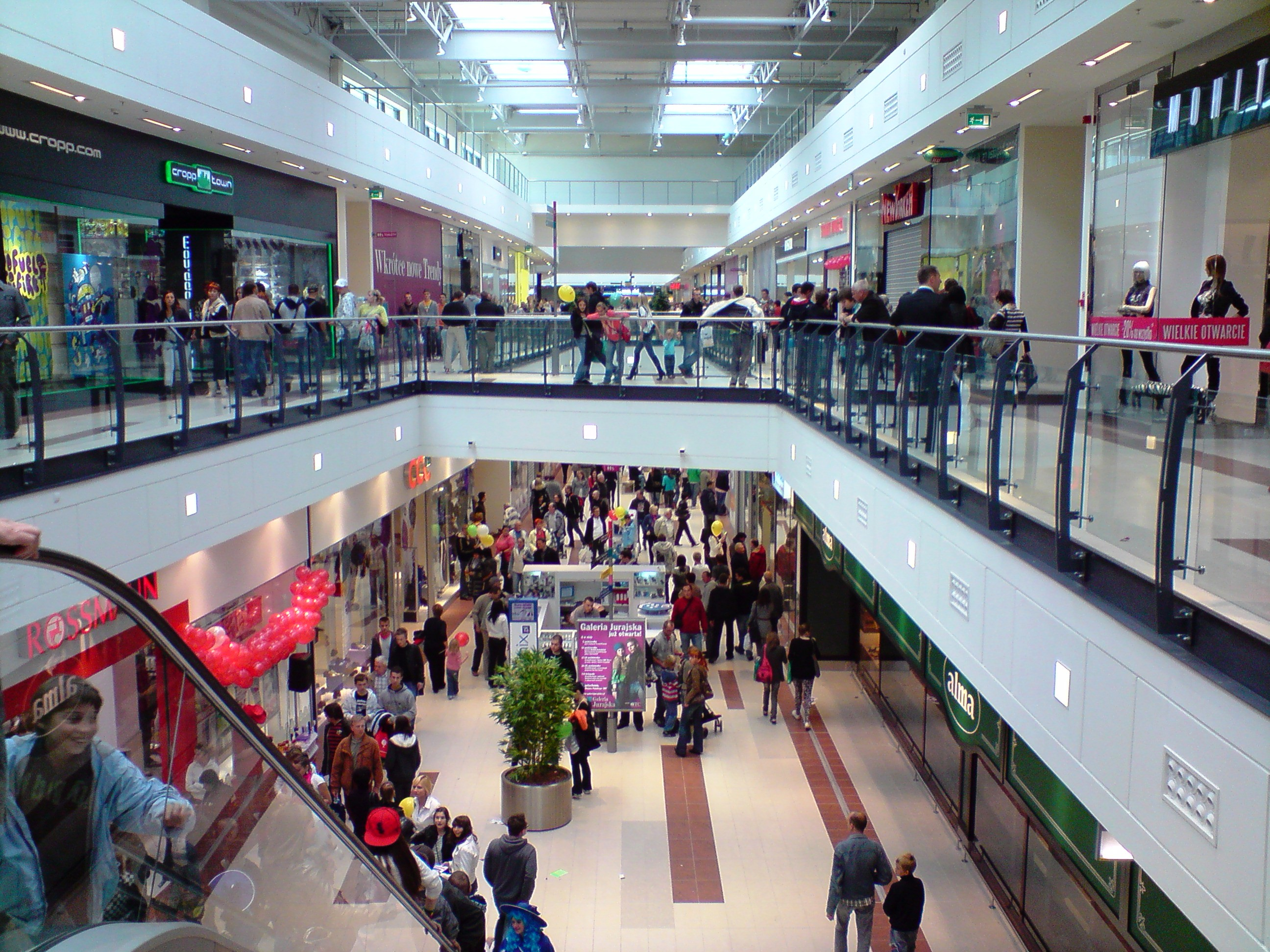
Interior

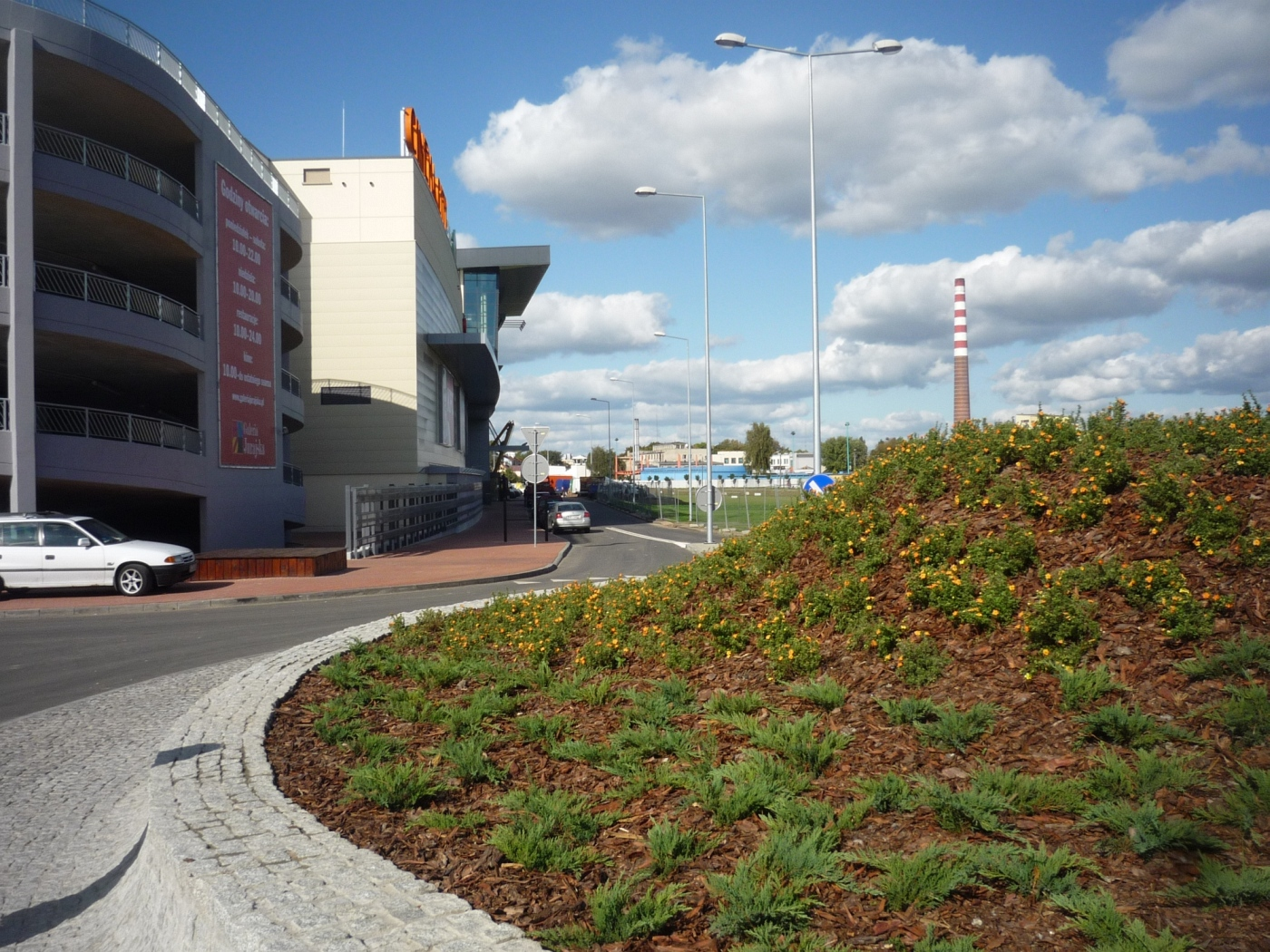
Day before opening

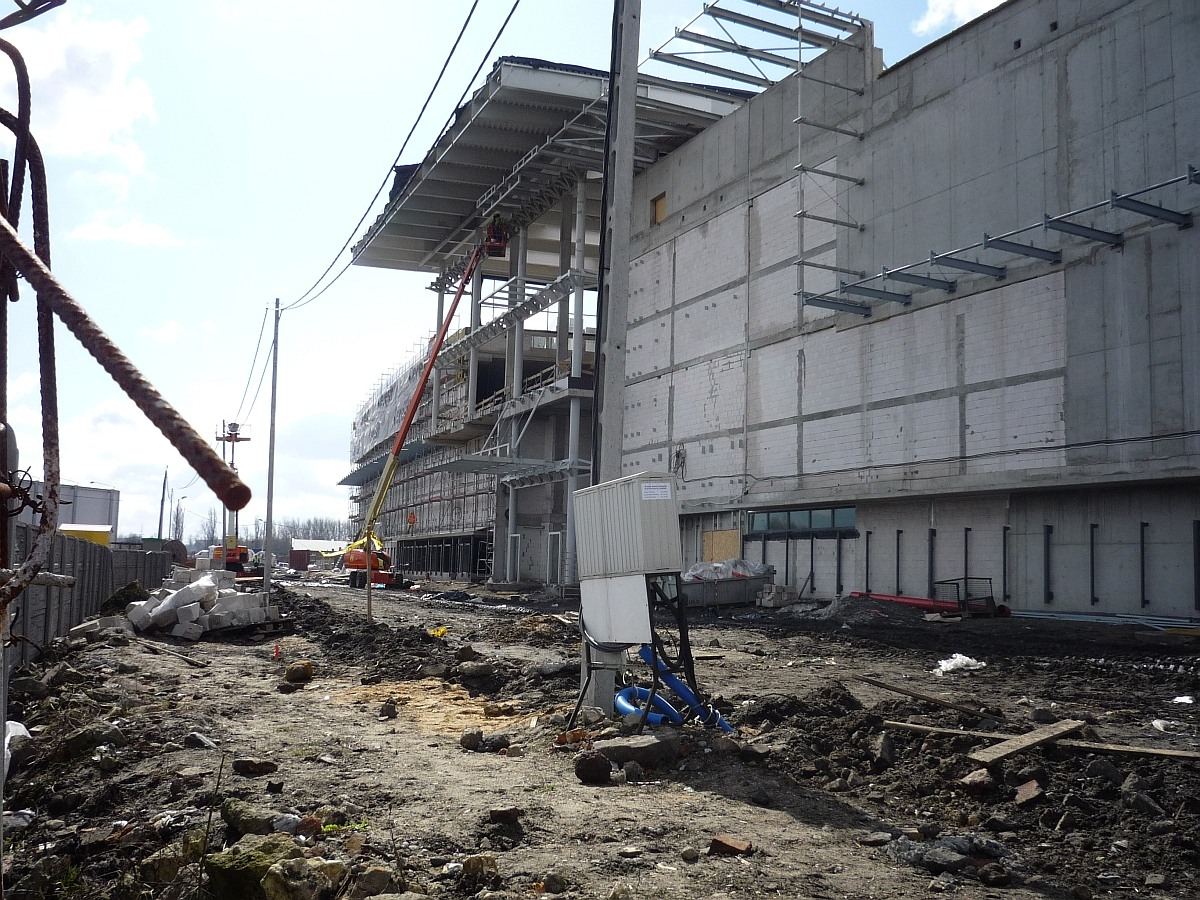
Building during construction
