= Media Expert =

Polish store chain

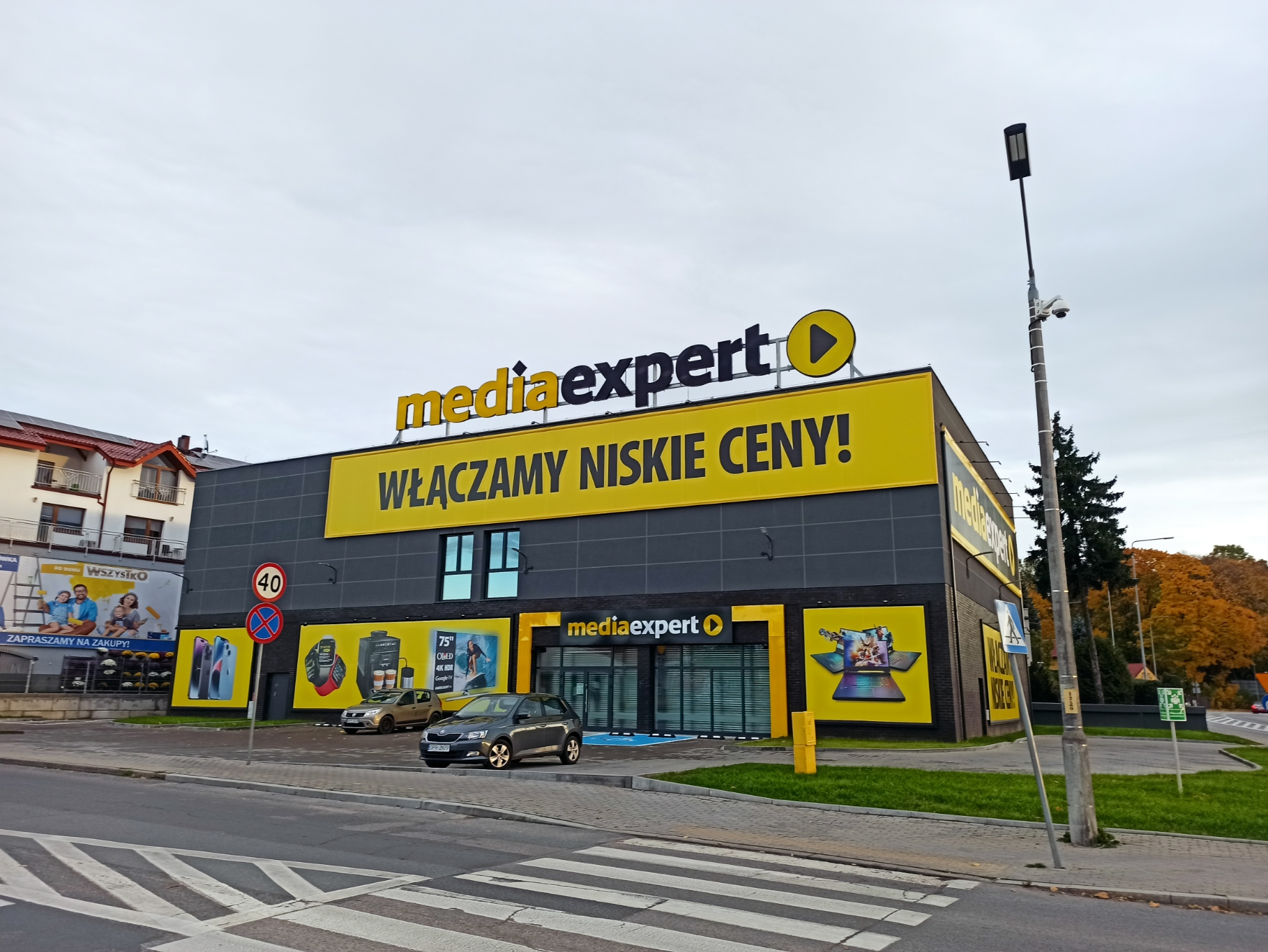
- Media Expert store in Prudnik
- Company type: Joint-stock company
- Industry: Retail
- Founder: Teresa Grzebita
- Headquarters: Złotów, Poland
- Area served: Poland
- Key people: Marek Grzebita (CEO)
- Products: Consumer electronics
- Website: mediaexpert.pl

Media Expert (stylized as mediaexpert) is a Polish chain of stores specializing in consumer electronics and home appliances. Founded in 2002, it is operated by TERG S.A., a company based in Złotów.

== History ==
The origins of Media Expert date back to the early 1990s when TERG was founded by Teresa Grzebita, after whom the company is named. Initially, TERG focused on selling small household appliances, such as irons, mixers, and kettles, before expanding its offerings to include consumer electronics. The first three shops were opened in Złotów, Wałcz, and Człuchów, followed by additional locations in Piła. In the beginning, private garages served as warehouses.

In 2002, the Media Expert chain was established by a consortium of several companies, including TERG, along with entrepreneurs from the consumer electronics and household appliances sectors across various regions of Poland. This collaboration aimed to reduce operational and procurement costs, enhancing the chain's competitiveness in the market.

By January 2015, Media Expert operated over 300 stores, a number that grew to more than 440 stores in 340 Polish cities by 30 November 2017. As of 27 August 2024, the chain comprises 580 physical stores in approximately 450 cities. The company employed over 5,000 people as of January 2012, around 7,500 by 30 November 2017, and more than 11,000 by 2024.

== Organizational structure ==
As of 2024, Media Expert group includes TERG S.A. and 12 regional companies (ME M01 sp. z o. o., ME M02 sp. z o. o., ..., ME M12 sp. z o. o.), all headquartered in Złotów. TERG S.A. operates the Media Expert online store at mediaexpert.pl. The company also owns the Electro and Avans brands, with online stores at electro.pl and avans.pl, respectively.

== Marketing ==
Media Expert employs distinctive marketing campaigns that often feature prominent Polish celebrities. In November 2012, singer Doda gained attention for an advertisement in which she appeared nude, promoting the chain's pricing strategy under the slogan Włączamy niskie ceny ("We Turn on Low Prices"). In 2014, the chain partnered with singer Ewelina Lisowska, incorporating her hit song W stronę słońca into their advertising. In 2020, Media Expert appointed Cleo, a notable Polish artist, as its artistic director to oversee the creative direction of its advertising.

== Gallery ==
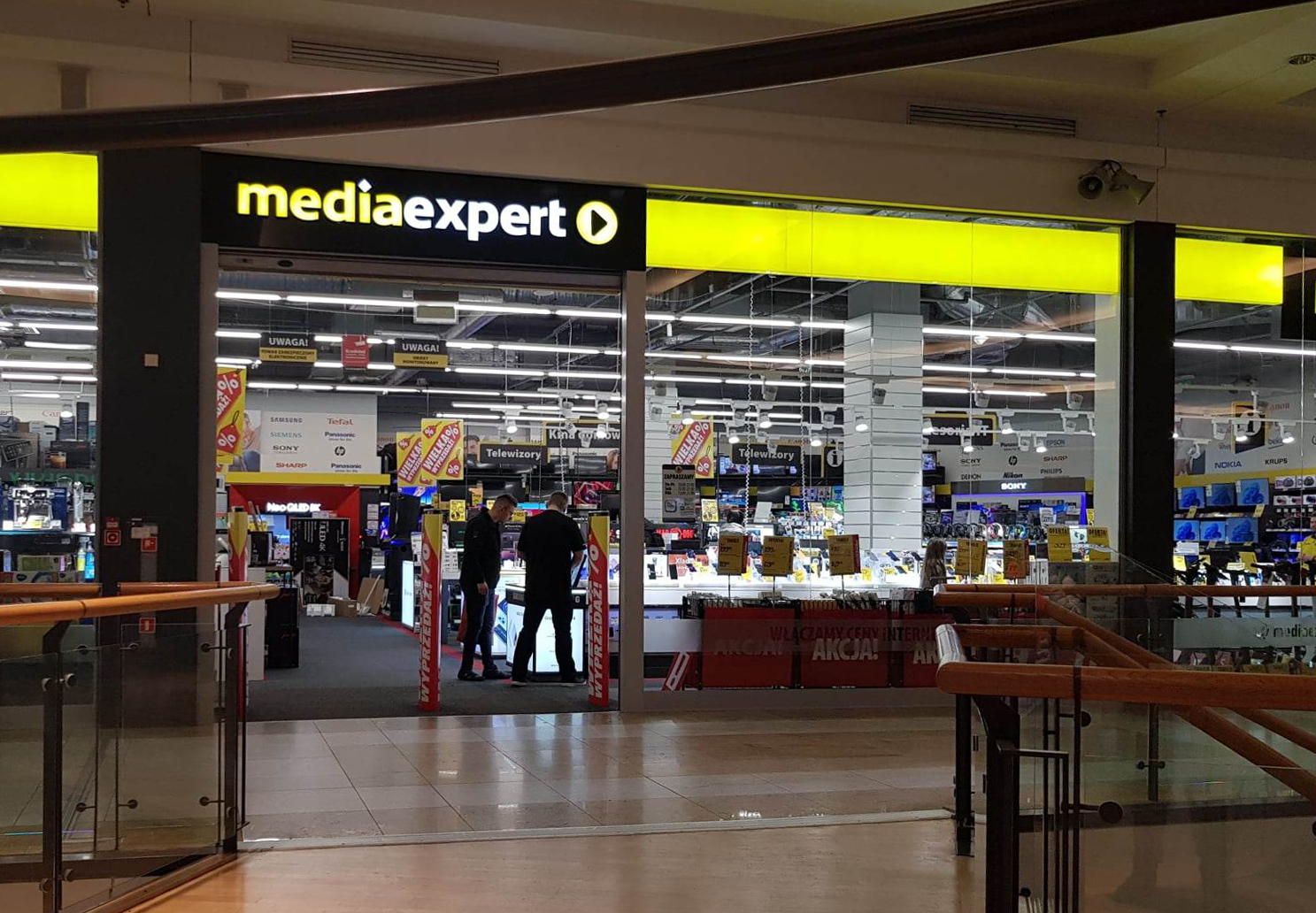
A Media Expert store in a shopping center in Kraków

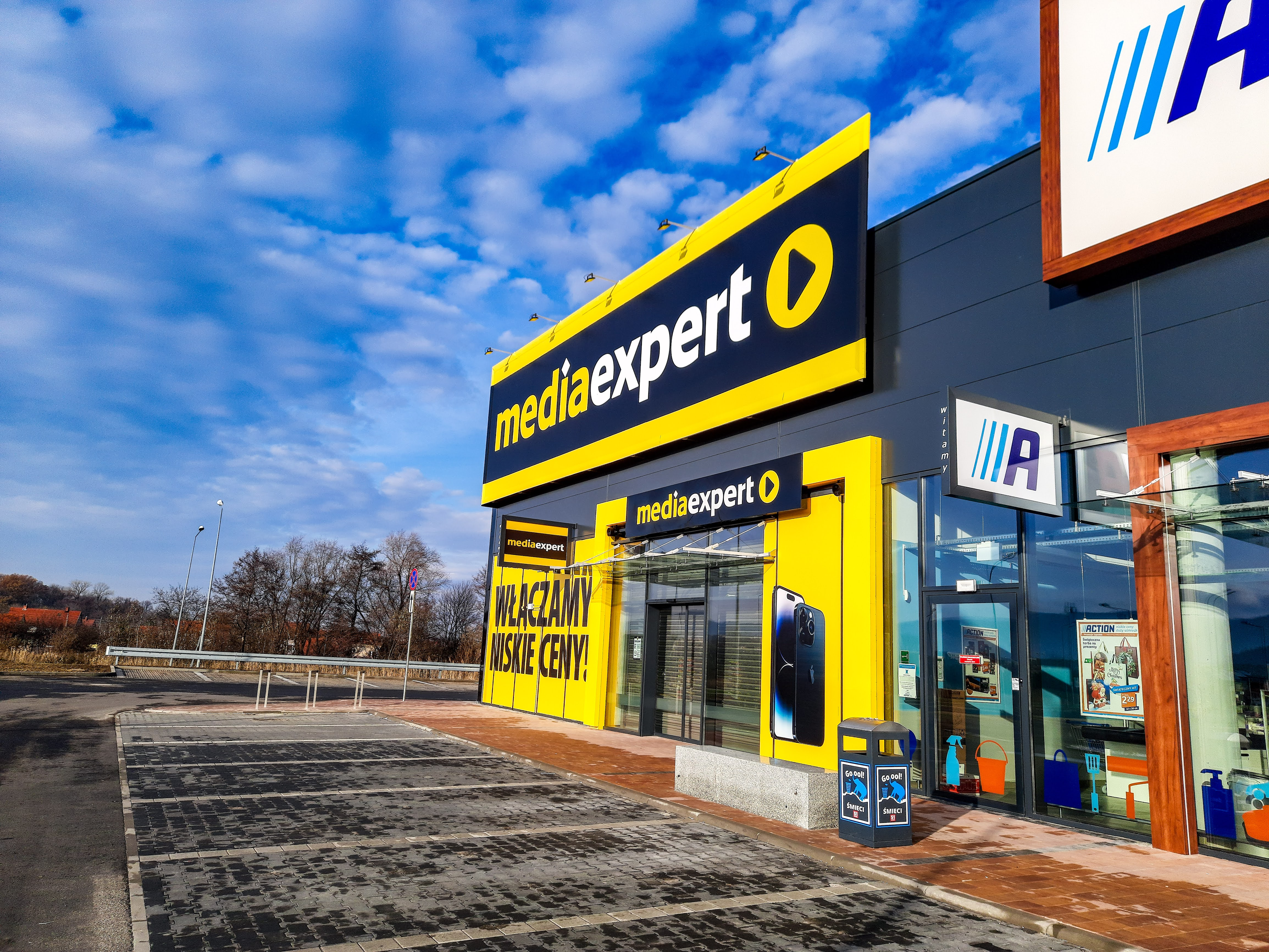
A Media Expert store in Bielawa

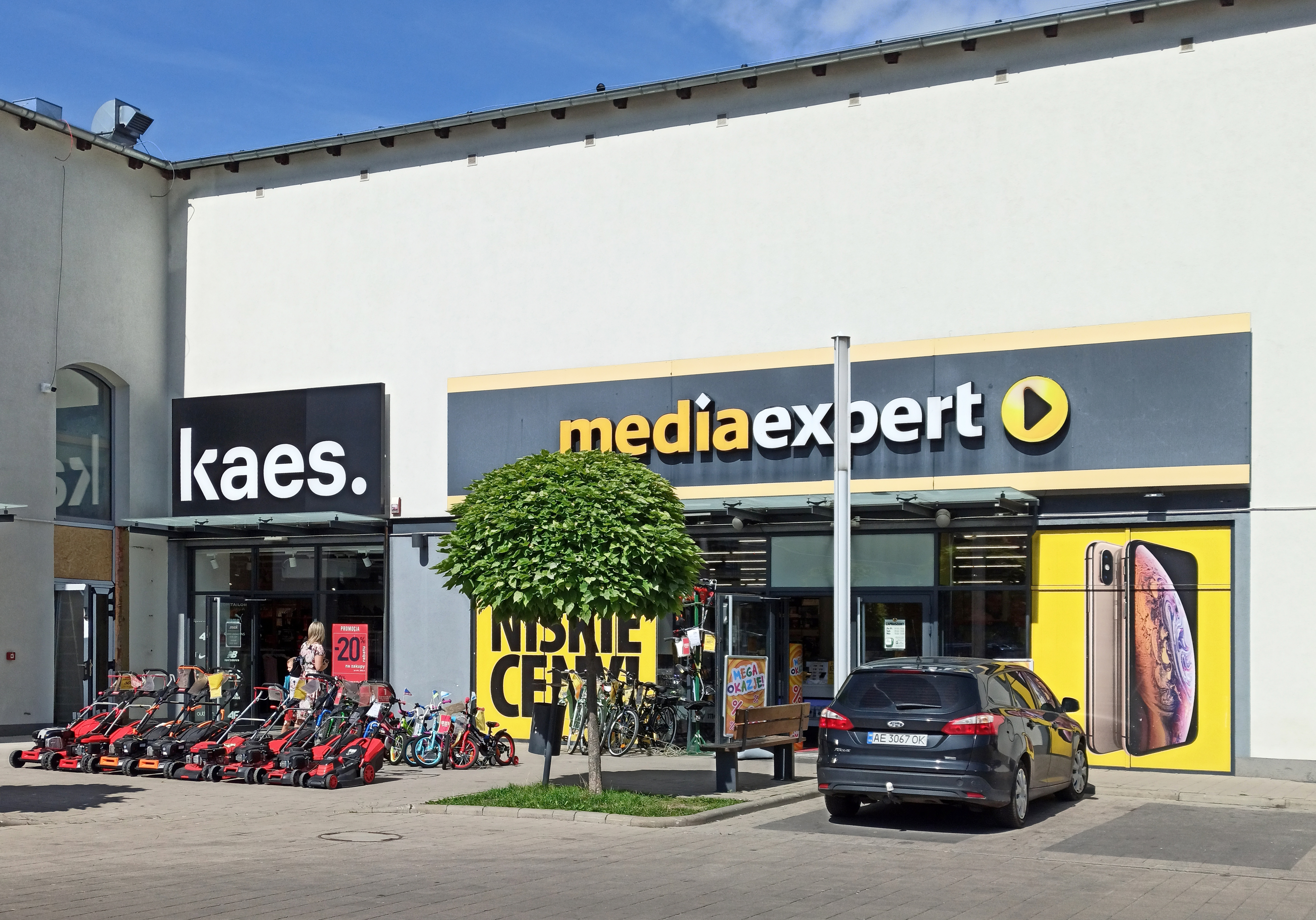
A Media Expert store in Kamienna Góra

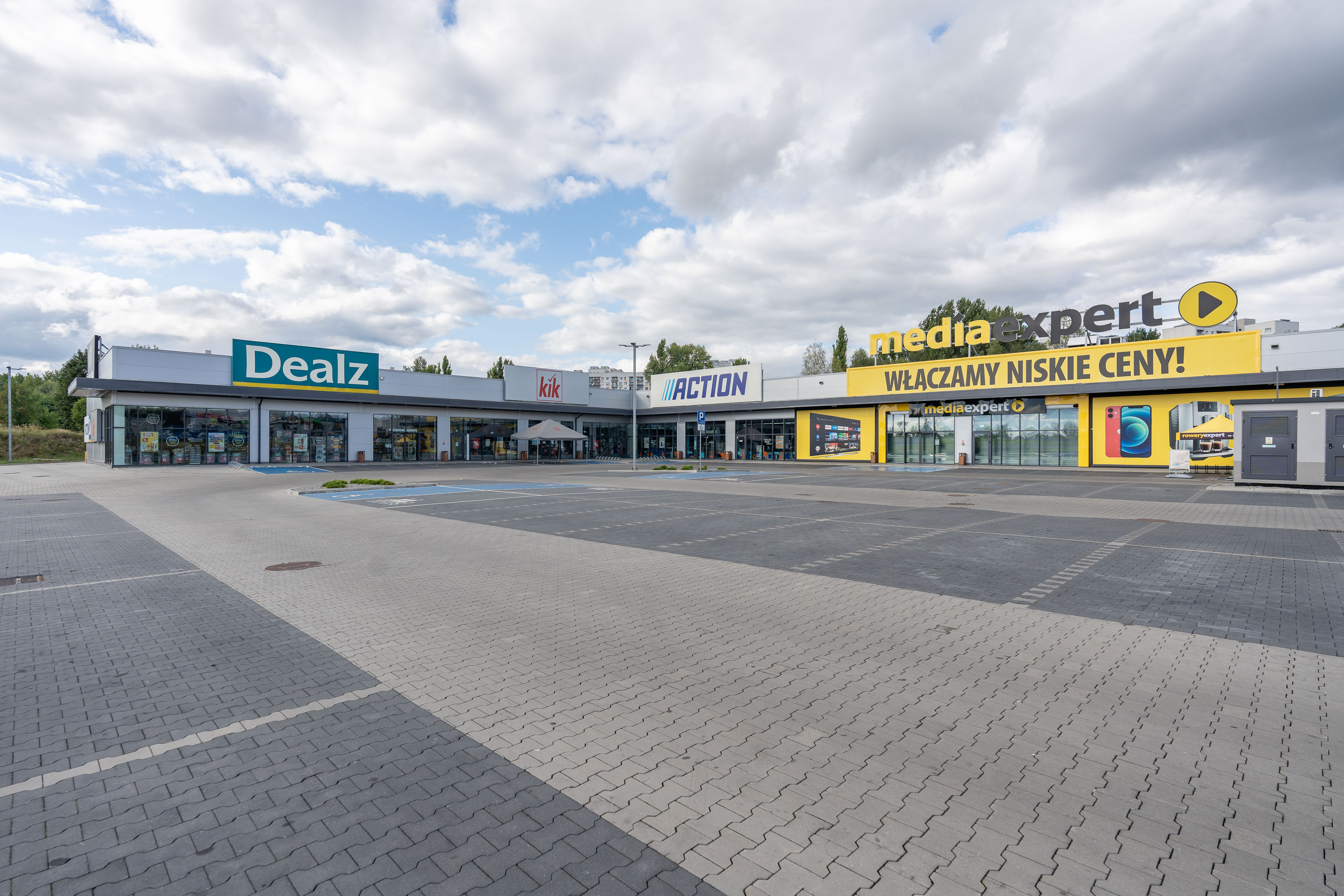
A Media Expert store on a retail park in Sosnowiec

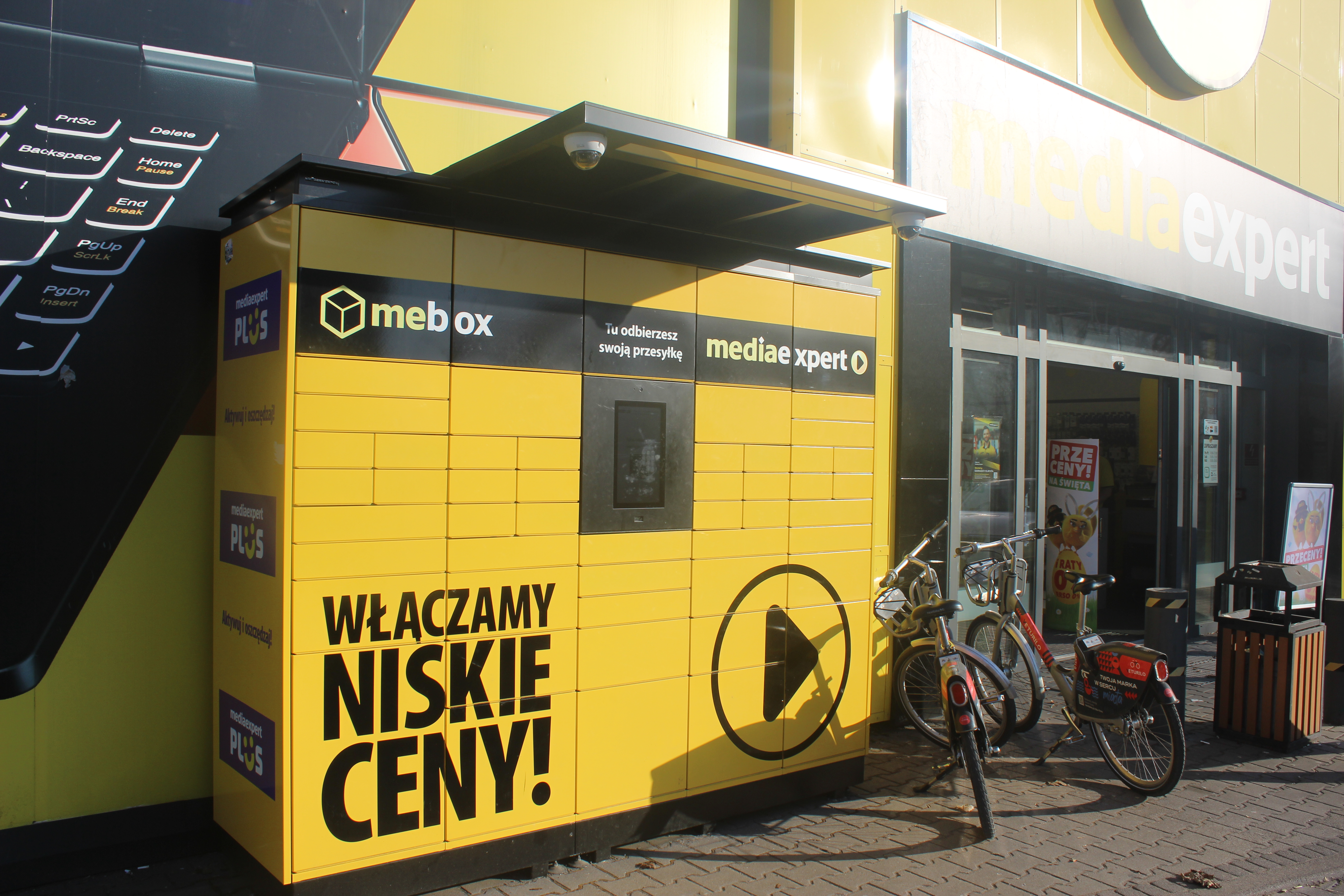
A Media Expert parcel locker in Warsaw
