= Plejada Sosnowiec =

Shopping center in Środula, Sosnowiec, Poland

Coordinates: 50°17′27″N 19°9′7″E

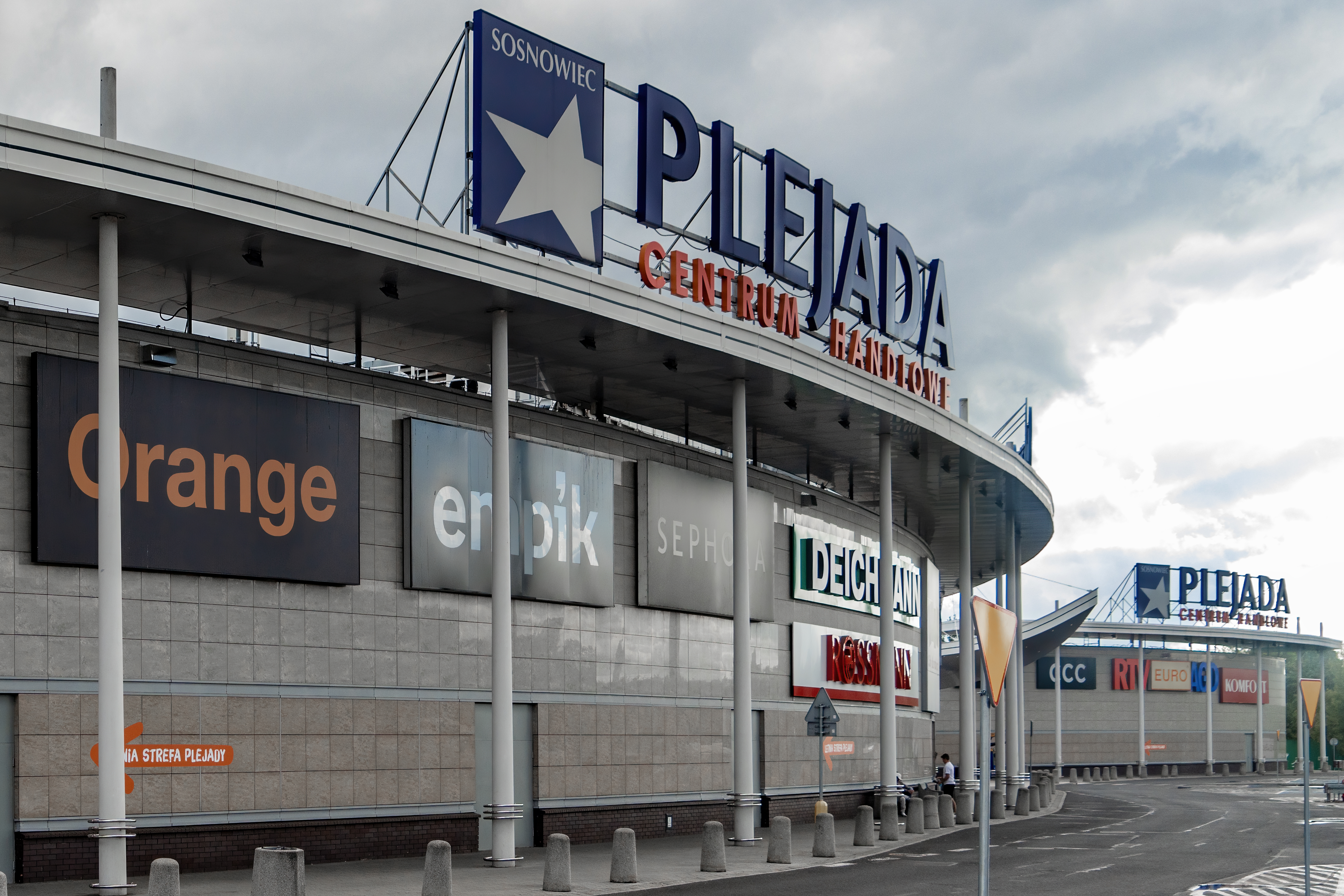
Plejada Sosnowiec

Plejada Sosnowiec is a shopping center in Sosnowiec, Poland. It was opened in 2001. It includes a shopping mall and a Carrefour hypermarket. It is located in the Środula – Konstantynów district, between the streets Staszica, Norwida and 3 Maja.

The building at Staszica 8B is a one-storey building with a total area of 40,000 m^{2} and a usable area of 36,000 m^{2}, of which the largest part is occupied by commercial space – 26,000 m^{2}, and houses 117 shops.

In addition to the hypermarket, the shopping center has 80 other stores and service outlets. There is a car park with 1350 parking spaces, two petrol stations (Carrefour, Moya) and a car wash.

== History ==
The construction of the Plejada Shopping Centre began on 27 February 2001 on the wasteland of the former Buczek Steelworks (formerly Huta Katarzyna), where the famous slag heap of the Katarzyna Steelworks was located until the 1980s, what is an example of successful recultivation of industrial areas The construction was completed on 13 November 2001. The main investors were: the Polish branch of the Danish company Agat Ejendomme and polish subsidiary of Ahold. The construction cost about US$40 million (over PLN 160 million). The general contractor of the construction was Mostostal Zabrze. The opening took place on 14 November 2001 and the original tenants included: Hypernowa and the Entertainment Center (with a climbing wall).

In 2003, Ahold sold the Hypernowa chain to Carrefour Poland, as a result of which the main market in Plejada changed. In 2005, the gallery was sold to a fund managed by St. Martins Property Group. In 2007, the center was expanded with another arcade, which included 16 new stores (chocolate parlor and fitness club). Construction works were carried out by Mostostal Zabrze. In 2010, Cushman & Wakefield took over the management of the facility. In 2012, the center underwent a major renovation.

In 2020, a Biedronka store was opened in the immediate vicinity of the shopping center, and in 2021 work began on the launch of more stores of Euro Mall, a company owned by TK Development. In 2022, a retail park was opened in this place Aura Park with Kik, Dealz, Action, and Media Expert stores.

== Transport ==
The shopping center is located in the immediate vicinity of 3 Maja Street, which is connected via two road junctions: one with Norwida–Zaruskiego–Kombajnistów Streets and another with Narutowicza and Staszica Streets. Public transport is provided by two tram stops named "Konstantynów Centrum Handlowe," served by a single tram line (24). Approximately 300 meters from the shopping center, there are tram stops of line no. 15 ("Sielec Osiedle Zamkowa"), and at a distance of 500 meters, there is a pair of bus stops with the same name, served by seven metropolitan bus routes. About 800 meters from the shopping center, there is a set of bus and tram stops called "Środula Osiedle," served by 14 ZTM bus lines and one tram line (no. 15). In the vicinity of the complex there is a city bike station No. 27026.
