= Targówek (shopping centre) =

Shopping mall in Warsaw, Poland

Coordinates: 52°18′12″N 21°3′26″E

Targówek Shopping Center is a shopping center in Warsaw, at ul. Głębocka 15, in the district of Targówek. It has over 140 Polish and international shops and restaurants as well as a Multikino 12 screen cinema.

The center opened in September 1997 and it was at that time the largest and most modern in Poland. It was also one of the first large shopping centers in Poland. Since then it has increased in size and been modernised and currently (2008) the center covers 65,000 m^{2}, of which 50,000 m^{2} is commercial premises. The center has parking for over 2000 cars.

The current owner is Foras Targówek Property.
