= TriGranit =

- Type: Privately owned
- Industry: Real estate investment, development and construction management
- Founded: 1997
- Headquarters: Budapest, Hungary
- Key people: Tom Lisiecki - CEO; Eric Assimakopoulos - COB; Agnieszka Turowska - CFO
- Website: https://trigranit.com/

TriGranit is one of the largest privately owned real estate platforms in Central Europe, focusing primarily on retail and office buildings in urban locations. TriGranit manages investment, acquisition, development, and construction. In its two decades of operation, TriGranit developed nearly 50 projects creating 1.6 million square meters of GLA in 7 CEE countries.

== History and projects ==
TriGranit was formed by the merge of Gránit Polus, TrizecHahn, AIG and EBRD in 1997.

In 1999, TriGranit created the 194 000 sqm GBA WestEnd City Center in Budapest, Hungary, a new city center in downtown Budapest, signaling the company's pioneer development in the region that has both retail, offices, leisure and entertainment parts. Polus City Center, an 82 000 sqm GBA retail and entertainment center was opened in 2000 in Bratislava, Slovakia.

2005 marked the construction of three different type of projects. MÜPA – The Palace of Arts in Budapest, which houses the Ludwig Museum, the Festival Theatre and the Béla Bartók National Concert Hall, opened in May 2005. The building won "the Oscar of architecture", the FIABCI Prix d'Excellence award in 2006.

In 2005, Duna-Pest Residences, a 300 unit luxury apartment complex on the bank of the Danube, was opened. In November 2005, Silesia City Center, a 120 000 sqm GBA retail and entertainment center in Katowice was opened. The centre was built on the site of an old, long-closed mine and TriGranit raised a chapel alongside the building in memory of the miners.

TriGranit was among the first companies to join the Green Building Programme, established by the European Commission, which awards eco-friendly buildings.

Silesia City Center won the CEE Real Estate Quality Award in 2006. Further development of the Silesia site was the construction of the 1000-apartment complex Oak Terraces.

Millennium Tower I in Budapest with 18 000 sqm GLA office space was opened in 2006. In the same year, TriGranit took over the property management of Papp László Budapest Sportaréna. In 2007 as the first project in Romania, TriGranit delivered Polus Center Cluj, an 80 000 sqm GBA shopping centre in Cluj-Napoca in this year.

Despite the economic crisis TriGranit in 2008 developed Lakeside Park office complex in Bratislava, Slovakia. With its almost 85 m height, it is among the tallest buildings of Bratislava. In 2008, Millennium City Center in Budapest, Hungary was extended with Millennium Tower II and Millennium Tower III with 39 500 sqm GLA office space.

TriGranit made investments in Poland and Croatia in 2009. The development of Bonarka City Center, a 257 000 sqm GBA retail and entertainment center in Kraków was completed. Arena Zagreb, a modern sports arena with a capacity of 15,000 seats, was built in Zagreb.

In 2010, TriGranit has completed its second Zagreb-based project, Arena Centar, a 200 000 sqm GBA retail project.

In 2011, further developments of the new city center in Kraków, Poland takes place with buildings 'A' and 'B' of Bonarka for Business (B4B) office complex of Kraków completed. This project consists of 10 Class "A" office buildings. In the same year, K&H Group Headquarters building was added to Millennium City Center in Budapest.

The first PPP project in Poland was built by TriGranit. The Poznan Central Railway station was constructed and opened in 2012. The railway station was the first phase of a multiple development of Poznan's new city center. Later phases are a retail center, offices, apartments.

TriGranit delivered buildings "C" & "D" of the Class „A" B4B Office Tower in Kraków. As a result, the company has completed projects with a total value of over 2.5 billion euros by 2013. In the same year, Poznan City Center, a 58,000 sqm GLA shopping and entertainment centre, which is an integral part of the city's new commercial and transportation hub was opened.

In 2015 is a new milestone in the life of the TriGranit. TPG Real Estate, the real estate platform of global private investment firm TPG, purchased TriGranit. Under the terms of the agreement, TPG Real Estate acquired TriGranit's development and asset management platform as well as a portfolio of the full Polish, Slovak and part of the Hungarian and Croatian high-quality assets. The aim of TPGRE, with further capital injection, is to create the CEE region's leading real estate investment, development and management platform.

Meanwhile, Building "E" of B4B Office Tower in Kraków, Poland was completed in 2015.

In 2016, TriGranit completed two market defining transactions in Hungary and Poland by selling two of his successful retail and office developments. In September, the company completed the sale of Bonarka City Center (BCC) in Kraków to Rockcastle. The transaction was the largest single asset transaction on the 2016 Polish real estate market. Also in the Fall of 2016, TriGranit sold Millennium Towers in Budapest, a Class A 70,400 sqm complex, consisting of four office buildings within the Millennium City Center in Budapest, Hungary, for €175 million. The transaction is one of the largest ever office deals in the Hungarian market, by both value and gross leasable area. Meanwhile, in Kraków, Poland, Building "F" of Bonarka for Business was handed over adding 10 000 sqm GLA to the Kraków office market.

In 2017, TriGranit is celebrated its 20 years in business. The seventh office tower, G, of the Bonarka 4 Business office complex has been handed over and the construction of building H has been launched.

In 2018, Revetas, a specialist real estate investment manager focusing on the Central and Eastern Europe (‘CEE’) region, together with funds managed by Goldman Sachs Asset Management, has acquired TriGranit from TPG Real Estate, the real estate platform of global alternative asset firm TPG.

By the acquisition of the TriGranit portfolio, Revetas and TriGranit aims to align in the future Revetas’ outstanding investment, acquisition, and fund management know-how with TriGranit's more than 20 years of development experience to create further exceptional, REAL estates on the Central European real-estate market. In 2018, the construction of Millennium Gardens office building in Budapest has been started.
