= 2004 United Kingdom local elections =

- 10 June 2004

36 metropolitan boroughs, 19 unitary authorities, 89 English districts, and all 22 Welsh principal areas
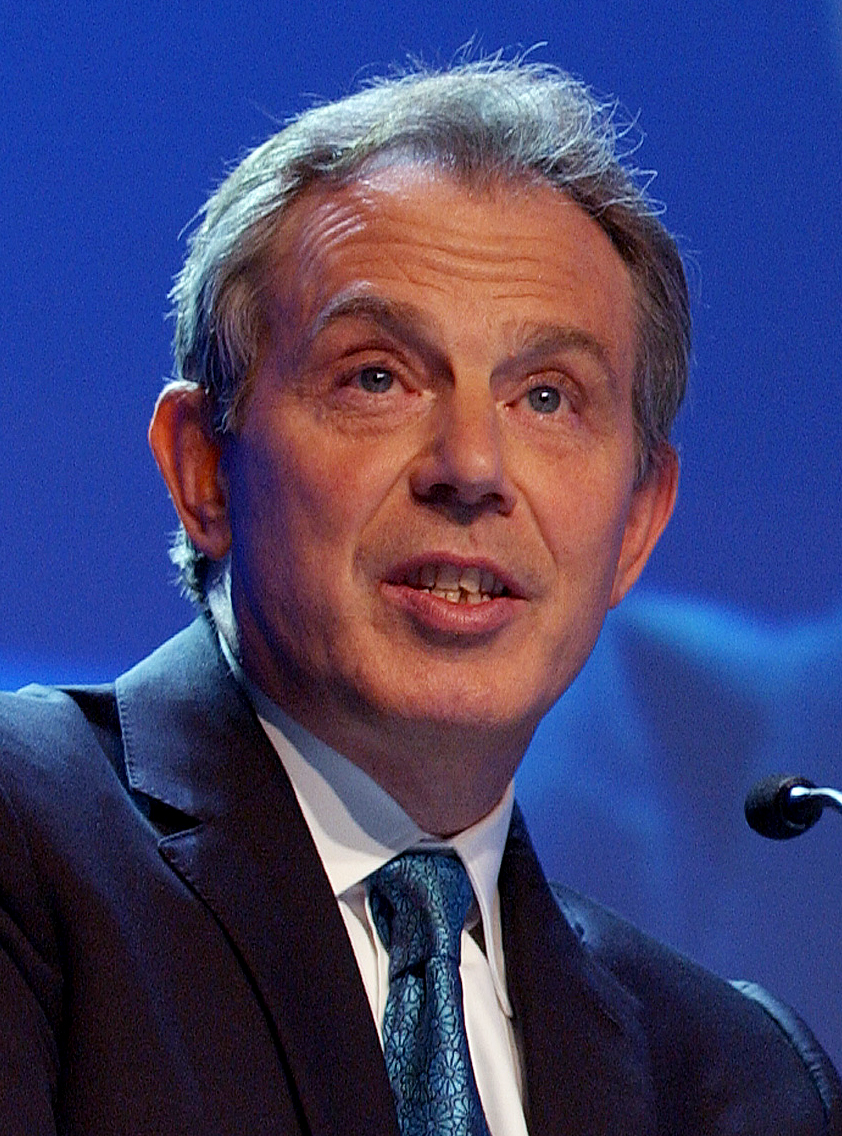

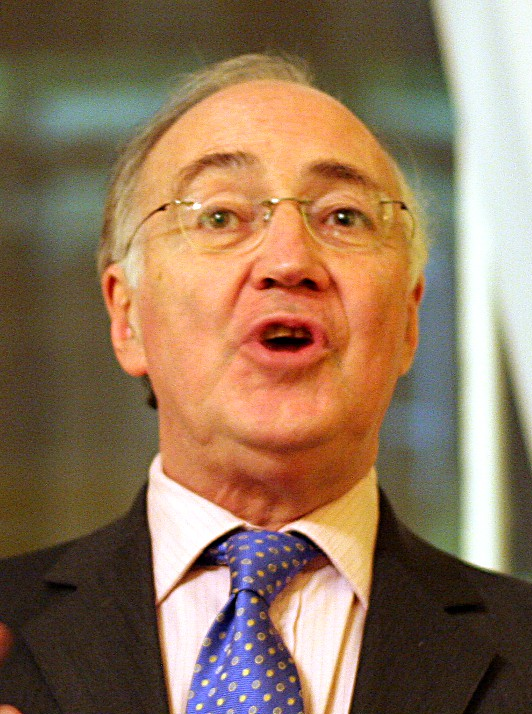

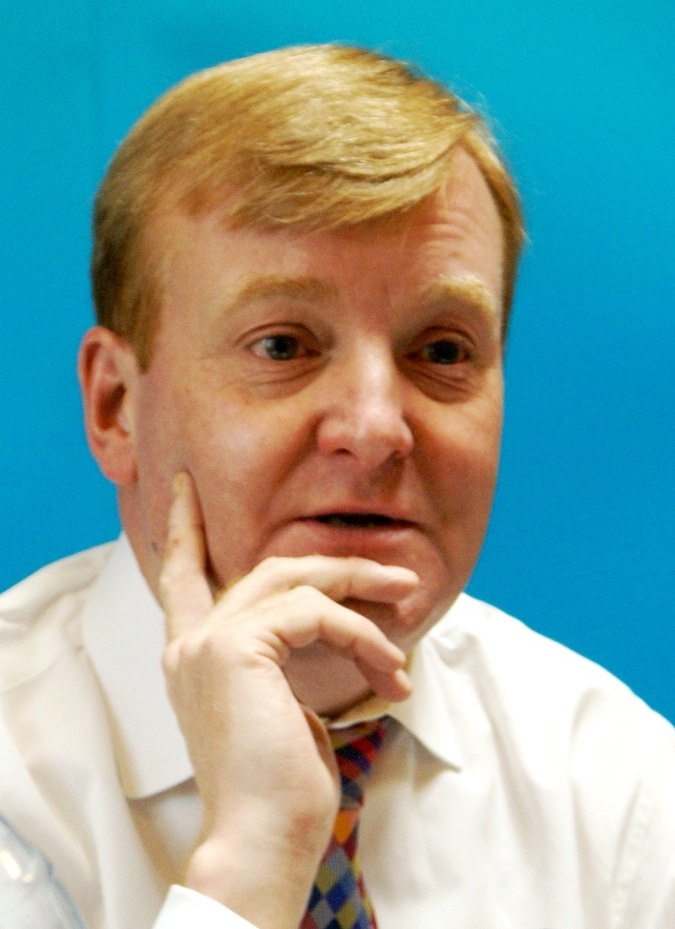
	Majority party	Minority party	Third party
Leader	Tony Blair	Michael Howard	Charles Kennedy
Party	Labour	Conservative	Liberal Democrats
Leader since	21 July 1994	6 November 2003	9 August 1999
Percentage	26%	37%	27%
Swing	▼4%	▲2%	▼3%
Councils	39	51	9
Councils +/-	▼8	▲13	▼2
Councillors	2,251	1,714	1,279
Councillors +/-	▼464	▲288	▲123
- Colours denote council control following elections, as shown in the main table of results.

The 2004 United Kingdom local elections were held on Thursday 10 June 2004, along with the European elections and the London mayoral and Assembly elections.

The councils of all the metropolitan boroughs in England and all the principal areas of Wales were all up for re-election, along with many other district and unitary authorities throughout England. No local elections were held in Scotland.

== Overall ==
These were the first elections since Michael Howard became leader of the Conservative Party. Howard was looking for a good result in the election to confirm that the Conservatives were back on the road to being able to seriously consider winning the next general election.

Early results confirmed that the Labour Party was having a bad time. Deputy Prime Minister John Prescott said that, "Iraq was a cloud, or indeed a shadow, over these elections. I am not saying we haven't had a kicking. It's not a great day for Labour".

However the Conservatives were not making many of the gains that would have indicated a complete change of electoral fortune. The national equivalent share of the vote in the election was found by academics Colin Rallings and Michael Thrasher to be 37% to the Conservatives, 27% to the Liberal Democrats and 26% to Labour. For one of the two major parties to come third in local elections was unheard of in the post-1945 period, let alone for a governing party with such a large majority to come third.

Even in the North, Labour's traditional heartland, Labour did not do too well, losing control of Doncaster, Leeds, Newcastle and St Helens. However, they did pick up several councils, notably Caerphilly and Rhondda Cynon Taff from Plaid Cymru in Wales.

Despite an increase in their vote and number of councillors, the Liberal Democrats saw a net loss of councils to NOC. The loss to the Conservatives of Eastbourne was in a single-seat by-election. This was partially offset by victories in Newcastle upon Tyne and Pendle.

The British National Party made a net gain of four seats, and held 14. This left them with a total 21 councillors in the country, including six in Burnley and four in Bradford. In the wards they contested, they averaged 16.1% of the vote.

It was to prove a false dawn for the Conservatives; when Britain went to the polls for the following year's general election, Labour was re-elected, although its majority was greatly reduced and the Conservatives did make gains.

== England ==
=== Metropolitan boroughs ===
Council	Previous control	Result	Details
Barnsley ‡	Labour	Labour hold	Details
Birmingham ‡	No overall control	No overall control hold	Details
Bolton ‡	No overall control	No overall control hold	Details
Bradford ‡	No overall control	No overall control hold	Details
Bury ‡	Labour	Labour hold	Details
Calderdale ‡	No overall control	No overall control hold	Details
Coventry ‡	No overall control	No overall control hold	Details
Doncaster ‡	Labour	No overall control gain	Details
Dudley ‡	No overall control	Conservative gain	Details
Gateshead ‡	Labour	Labour hold	Details
Kirklees ‡	No overall control	No overall control hold	Details
Knowsley ‡	Labour	Labour hold	Details
Leeds ‡	Labour	No overall control gain	Details
Liverpool ‡	Liberal Democrats	Liberal Democrats hold	Details
Manchester ‡	Labour	Labour hold	Details
Newcastle upon Tyne ‡	Labour	Liberal Democrats gain	Details
North Tyneside ‡	No overall control	No overall control hold	Details
Oldham ‡	Labour	Labour hold	Details
Rochdale ‡	No overall control	No overall control hold	Details
Rotherham ‡	Labour	Labour hold	Details
St Helens ‡	Labour	No overall control gain	Details
Salford ‡	Labour	Labour hold	Details
Sandwell ‡	Labour	Labour hold	Details
Sefton ‡	No overall control	No overall control hold	Details
Sheffield ‡	Labour	Labour hold	Details
Solihull ‡	Conservative	Conservative hold	Details
South Tyneside ‡	Labour	Labour hold	Details
Stockport ‡	Liberal Democrats	Liberal Democrats hold	Details
Sunderland ‡	Labour	Labour hold	Details
Tameside ‡	Labour	Labour hold	Details
Trafford ‡	No overall control	Conservative gain	Details
Wakefield ‡	Labour	Labour hold	Details
Walsall ‡	No overall control	Conservative gain	Details
Wigan ‡	Labour	Labour hold	Details
Wirral ‡	No overall control	No overall control hold	Details
Wolverhampton ‡	Labour	Labour hold	Details

‡ New ward boundaries

=== Unitary authorities ===
==== Whole council ====
Council	Previous control	Result	Details
Blackburn with Darwen ‡	Labour	Labour hold	Details
Halton ‡	Labour	Labour hold	Details
Hartlepool ‡	No overall control	Labour gain	Details
Peterborough ‡	No overall control	Conservative gain	Details
Reading ‡	Labour	Labour hold	Details
Slough ‡	Labour	No overall control gain	Details
Thurrock ‡	Labour	Conservative gain	Details
Warrington ‡	Labour	Labour hold	Details
Wokingham ‡	Conservative	Conservative hold	Details

‡ New ward boundaries

==== Third of council ====
Council	Previous control	Result	Details
Derby	No overall control	No overall control hold	Details
Kingston upon Hull	No overall control	No overall control hold	Details
Milton Keynes	Liberal Democrats	Liberal Democrats hold	Details
North East Lincolnshire	No overall control	No overall control hold	Details
Plymouth	Labour	Labour hold	Details
Portsmouth	No overall control	No overall control hold	Details
Southampton	No overall control	No overall control hold	Details
Southend-on-Sea	Conservative	Conservative hold	Details
Stoke-on-Trent	No overall control	Labour gain	Details
Swindon	No overall control	Conservative gain	Details

=== District councils ===
==== Whole council ====
Council	Previous control	Result	Details
Adur ‡	Conservative	Conservative hold	Details
Broadland ‡	Conservative	Conservative hold	Details
Cambridge ‡	Liberal Democrats	Liberal Democrats hold	Details
Crawley ‡	Labour	Labour hold	Details
Great Yarmouth ‡	Conservative	Conservative hold	Details
Huntingdonshire ‡	Conservative	Conservative hold	Details
Norwich ‡	Liberal Democrats	No overall control gain	Details
Penwith ‡	No overall control	No overall control hold	Details
Redditch ‡	No overall control	Labour gain	Details
South Cambridgeshire ‡	No overall control	No overall control hold	Details
Weymouth & Portland ‡	No overall control	No overall control hold	Details
Worcester ‡	Conservative	Conservative hold	Details
Worthing ‡	No overall control	Conservative gain	Details
Wyre Forest ‡	No overall control	No overall control hold	Details

‡ New ward boundaries

==== Half of council ====
Council	Previous control	Result	Details
Cheltenham	Liberal Democrats	No overall control gain	Details
Fareham	Conservative	Conservative hold	Details
Gosport	No overall control	No overall control hold	Details
Hastings	Labour	No overall control gain	Details
Nuneaton & Bedworth	Labour	Labour hold	Details
Oxford	Labour	No overall control gain	Details

==== Third of council ====
Council	Previous control	Result	Details
Amber Valley	Conservative	Conservative hold	Details
Barrow-in-Furness	Labour	Labour hold	Details
Basildon	Conservative	Conservative hold	Details
Basingstoke & Deane	No overall control	No overall control hold	Details
Bassetlaw	Labour	No overall control gain	Details
Bedford	No overall control	No overall control hold	Details
Brentwood	No overall control	Conservative gain	Details
Broxbourne	Conservative	Conservative hold	Details
Burnley	Labour	No overall control gain	Details
Cannock Chase	No overall control	No overall control hold	Details
Carlisle	No overall control	No overall control hold	Details
Castle Point	Conservative	Conservative hold	Details
Cherwell	Conservative	Conservative hold	Details
Chester	No overall control	No overall control hold	Details
Chorley	No overall control	No overall control hold	Details
Colchester	No overall control	No overall control hold	Details
Congleton	Conservative	Conservative hold	Details
Craven	No overall control	No overall control hold	Details
Crewe & Nantwich	No overall control	No overall control hold	Details
Daventry	Conservative	Conservative hold	Details
Eastbourne	Liberal Democrats	Conservative gain	Details
Eastleigh	Liberal Democrats	Liberal Democrats hold	Details
Ellesmere Port & Neston	Labour	Labour hold	Details
Elmbridge	RA	RA hold	Details
Epping Forest	No overall control	No overall control hold	Details
Exeter	No overall control	No overall control hold	Details
Gloucester	No overall control	No overall control hold	Details
Harlow	No overall control	No overall control hold	Details
Harrogate	Conservative	Conservative hold	Details
Hart	Conservative	Conservative hold	Details
Havant	Conservative	Conservative hold	Details
Hertsmere	Conservative	Conservative hold	Details
Hyndburn	Conservative	Conservative hold	Details
Ipswich	Labour	No overall control gain	Details
Lincoln	Labour	Labour hold	Details
Macclesfield	Conservative	Conservative hold	Details
Maidstone	No overall control	No overall control hold	Details
Mole Valley	No overall control	No overall control hold	Details
Newcastle-under-Lyme	No overall control	Labour gain	Details
North Hertfordshire	Conservative	Conservative hold	Details
Pendle	No overall control	Liberal Democrats gain	Details
Preston	No overall control	No overall control hold	Details
Purbeck	Conservative	Conservative hold	Details
Reigate and Banstead	Conservative	Conservative hold	Details
Rochford	Conservative	Conservative hold	Details
Rossendale	No overall control	Conservative gain	Details
Rugby	No overall control	No overall control hold	Details
Runnymede	Conservative	Conservative hold	Details
Rushmoor	Conservative	Conservative hold	Details
St Albans	No overall control	No overall control hold	Details
Shrewsbury & Atcham	Conservative	Conservative hold	Details
South Bedfordshire	Conservative	Conservative hold	Details
South Lakeland	No overall control	No overall control hold	Details
Stevenage	Labour	Labour hold	Details
Stratford-on-Avon	Conservative	Conservative hold	Details
Stroud	Conservative	Conservative hold	Details
Swale	Conservative	Conservative hold	Details
Tamworth	Labour	Conservative gain	Details
Tandridge	Conservative	Conservative hold	Details
Three Rivers	Liberal Democrats	Liberal Democrats hold	Details
Tunbridge Wells	Conservative	Conservative hold	Details
Watford	Liberal Democrats	Liberal Democrats hold	Details
Waveney	No overall control	No overall control hold	Details
Welwyn Hatfield	Conservative	Conservative hold	Details
West Lancashire	Conservative	Conservative hold	Details
West Lindsey	No overall control	Conservative gain	Details
West Oxfordshire	Conservative	Conservative hold	Details
Winchester	Liberal Democrats	No overall control gain	Details
Woking	No overall control	No overall control hold	Details

=== Mayoral elections ===
Local Authority	Previous Mayor	Mayor-elect	Details
London	Ken Livingstone (Labour)	Ken Livingstone (Labour) hold	Details

== Wales ==
Map showing council control (left) and ward control (right).

Council	Previous control	Result	Details
Anglesey	Independent	Independent hold	Details
Blaenau Gwent	Labour	Labour hold	Details
Bridgend	Labour	No overall control gain	Details
Caerphilly	Plaid Cymru	Labour gain	Details
Cardiff	Labour	No overall control gain	Details
Carmarthenshire	No overall control	No overall control hold	Details
Ceredigion	No overall control	No overall control hold	Details
Conwy	No overall control	No overall control hold	Details
Denbighshire	No overall control	No overall control hold	Details
Flintshire	Labour	Labour hold	Details
Gwynedd	Plaid Cymru	Plaid Cymru	Details
Merthyr Tydfil	No overall control	Labour gain	Details
Monmouthshire	No overall control	Conservative gain	Details
Neath Port Talbot	Labour	Labour hold	Details
Newport	Labour	Labour hold	Details
Pembrokeshire	Independent	Independent hold	Details
Powys	Independent	Independent hold	Details
Rhondda Cynon Taff	Plaid Cymru	Labour gain	Details
Swansea	Labour	No overall control gain	Details
Torfaen	Labour	Labour hold	Details
Vale of Glamorgan	No overall control	No overall control hold	Details
Wrexham	No overall control	No overall control hold	Details
