= 2004 United Kingdom elections =

Elections in the United Kingdom in 2004

2003: Scottish, Welsh, local
2004: European, London, local
2005: General Election, local

Super Thursday is significant both in politics and in publishing.

== Politics ==
Many elections in the United Kingdom took place on "Super Thursday", 10 June 2004.

- 2004 London mayoral election – won by Ken Livingstone
- 2004 London Assembly election
- the United Kingdom part of the 2004 European Parliament election
- local elections in many parts of England and Wales. In many districts ward boundaries were redrawn and so the entire council was being re-elected. This happened in all the metropolitan boroughs and all the counties and county boroughs of Wales.

The UK government used this opportunity to trial all-postal voting in both the local and European elections across four regions: North East, North West, East Midlands, and Yorkshire and the Humber. For more details, see here.

=== Results ===
The ruling Labour Party polled poorly in the local elections, and was beaten into third place, in terms of share of the vote, after the Conservative Party and the Liberal Democrats. They lost control of several large (and traditionally Labour) councils, including Newcastle upon Tyne and Leeds.

Of the minor parties, Plaid Cymru and the Green Party increased their number of councillors, whilst the United Kingdom Independence Party picked up a handful. The British National Party failed to make predicted gains in Burnley, and lost a seat in Blackburn with Darwen, but took three seats in Epping Forest and four in Bradford.

The UKIP made a much stronger showing in the European Parliament elections, where it increased its number of MEPs from 3 to 12.

See 2004 United Kingdom local elections for the full council results.

== Publishing ==
Super Thursday, in the publishing industry, also refers to an annual industry promotional event held on the second Thursday in October. The Guardian termed it "the publishing industry’s major assault on the Christmas market," and the occasion is associated with activities, advertising, and booklists previewed in the following day's The Bookseller." Super Thursday creates a "buzz" around books and, according to Waterstone's national press officer Jon Howells (quoted on 1 October 2009): "In the space of a year Super Thursday has gone from a clever turn of phrase to an essential date in the bookselling calendar. It has alerted everyone – booksellers, publishers, the media, and ultimately customers, to the incredible array of new titles available, and marks the unofficial start of the Christmas season." Sp

== See also ==
- Super Thursday, 2011
