= Super Thursday (disambiguation) =

In the United Kingdom, Super Thursday is a term sometimes used in the media to describe a day on which several different types of elections are taking place, usually at local and subnational level. Super Thursday may refer to:

- 2004 United Kingdom elections, on 10 June 2004
- 2011 United Kingdom elections, on 5 May 2011
- 2016 United Kingdom elections, on 5 May 2016
- 2021 United Kingdom elections, on 6 May 2021
