= 2021 United Kingdom elections =

The 2021 United Kingdom elections were several elections that took place in the United Kingdom on 6 May 2021 at the subnational and local levels. They have been colloquially referred to as Super Thursday. The elections that took place on this day are:

- 2021 Scottish Parliament election
- 2021 Senedd election
- 2021 Hartlepool by-election (for UK Parliament)
- 2021 United Kingdom local elections
- 2021 London mayoral election
- 2021 London Assembly election
- 2021 England and Wales police and crime commissioner elections
