= 2004 Hertsmere Borough Council election =

2004 UK local government election

- 10 June 2004

13 out of 39 seats to Hertsmere Borough Council 20 seats needed for a majority
- Registered: 66,605
- Turnout: 37.0% (▲14.0%)

	First party	Second party	Third party
Party	Conservative	Labour	Liberal Democrats
Seats won	10	1	2
Seats after	25	7	7
Seat change	▲1	▼2	▲1
Popular vote	13,278	5,728	5,460
Percentage	53.9%	23.2%	22.2%
Swing	▲1.9%	▼4.4%	▲3.1%
- Winner of each seat at the 2004 Hertsmere Borough Council election. Wards in white were not contested.
Control before election
Conservative
Control after election
Conservative

The 2004 Hertsmere Borough Council election took place on 10 June 2004 to elect members of Hertsmere Borough Council in Hertfordshire, England. This was on the same day as the 2004 European Parliament election and other local elections.

One third of the council was up for election and the Conservative Party stayed in overall control of the council.

== Summary ==
=== Background ===
Before the election the Conservatives controlled the council with 25 councillors, compared to 8 for Labour and 6 Liberal Democrats. 39 candidates stood for the 13 seats being contested, with 13 each from the Conservative and Labour parties, 12 Liberal Democrats and 1 from the Socialist Labour Party.

=== Election result ===
The Conservative Party remained on 25 seats, after both gaining and losing 2 seats. Labour finished 1 down on 7 seats, to be level with the Liberal Democrats for the first time, after the Liberal Democrats picked up a seat.

The Conservative gains from Labour came in Borehamwood Hillside where they won by 235 votes and in the former Labour stronghold of Borehamwood Brookmeadow, which had been held by Tim Sandle since 1995 (the area had been subject to a recent boundary change, with the main Labour voting part of the ward being reallocated to Cowley ward). Labour did take one seat back from the Conservatives in Borehamwood Cowley Hill by 87 votes, after the sitting Conservative councillor for Cowley Hill, Martin Heywood, contested and held Potters Bar Oakmere instead with a 709-vote majority for the Conservatives. Meanwhile, the Liberal Democrats picked up a seat from the Conservatives in Bushey St James by 59 votes.

Following the election the Labour and Liberal Democrat parties shared the main opposition role as both parties were on the same number of seats. Meanwhile, Labour chose a new leader, Leon Reefe, after Len Silverstone stood down as leader of the group.

2004 Hertsmere Borough Council election
Party	This election			Full council			This election		
Party	Seats	Net	Seats %	Other	Total	Total %	Votes	Votes %	+/−
Conservative	10	▲1	76.9	15	25	64.1	13,278	53.9	+1.9
Labour	1	▼2	7.7	6	7	17.9	5,728	23.2	–4.4
Liberal Democrats	2	▲1	15.4	5	7	17.9	5,460	22.2	+3.1
Socialist Labour	0	Steady	0.0	0	0	0.0	181	0.7	–0.4

== Ward results ==
Incumbent councillors standing for re-election are marked with an asterisk (*). Changes in seats do not take into account by-elections or defections.

=== Aldenham East ===
Aldenham East
Party	Candidate	Votes	%	±%
Conservative	John Graham*	1,319	77.5	–1.7
Liberal Democrats	Mark Silverman*	199	11.7	+1.3
Labour	Brian Levy	185	10.9	+0.5
Majority		1,120	65.8	–3.0
Turnout		1,703	44.0	+9.7
Registered electors		3,518		
Conservative hold		Swing	▼1.5	

=== Aldenham West ===
Aldenham West
Party	Candidate	Votes	%	±%
Conservative	Hugh Saunders*	882	65.2	–3.8
Liberal Democrats	David Bird	242	17.9	+2.3
Labour	Sandra Huff	228	16.9	+1.5
Majority		640	47.3	–6.1
Turnout		1,352	38.0	+6.5
Registered electors		3,287		
Conservative hold		Swing	▼3.1	

=== Borehamwood Brookmeadow ===
Borehamwood Brookmeadow
Party	Candidate	Votes	%	±%
Conservative	Jeremy Segall	758	47.5	+15.6
Labour	Tim Sandle*	548	34.4	–21.8
Liberal Democrats	Audrey McCracken	289	18.1	+6.2
Majority		210	13.2	N/A
Turnout		1,595	33.0	+10.0
Registered electors		4,843		
Conservative gain from Labour		Swing	▲18.7	

=== Borehamwood Cowley Hill ===
Borehamwood Cowley Hill
Party	Candidate	Votes	%	±%
Labour	Ann Harrison	654	38.8	–28.1
Conservative	Howard Rosen	567	33.6	+15.4
Liberal Democrats	Andrew Brass	284	16.8	N/A
Socialist Labour	James Dry	181	10.7	–4.2
Majority		87	5.2	–43.6
Turnout		1,686	30.5	+8.8
Registered electors		5,666		
Labour hold		Swing	▼21.8	

=== Borehamwood Hillside ===
Borehamwood Hillside
Party	Candidate	Votes	%	±%
Conservative	Hannah David	1,055	48.2	+0.3
Labour	Peter Hedges	820	37.4	–5.1
Liberal Democrats	Zissis Kakoulakis	316	14.4	+4.7
Majority		235	10.7	+5.4
Turnout		2,191	38.1	+4.6
Registered electors		5,779		
Conservative gain from Labour		Swing	▲2.7	

=== Bushey Heath ===
Bushey Heath
Party	Candidate	Votes	%	±%
Conservative	Seamus Quilty*	1,425	68.8	–3.6
Liberal Democrats	Roger Kutchinsky	423	20.4	+3.1
Labour	David Bearfield	222	10.7	+0.5
Majority		1,002	48.4	–6.7
Turnout		2,070	40.0	+17.0
Registered electors		5,095		
Conservative hold		Swing	▼3.4	

=== Bushey North ===
Bushey North
Party	Candidate	Votes	%	±%
Liberal Democrats	Robert Gamble*	905	56.8	–12.0
Conservative	John Slade	520	32.7	+11.6
Labour	George Bath	167	10.5	+3.6
Majority		385	24.2	–23.6
Turnout		1,592	35.4	+6.5
Registered electors		4,442		
Liberal Democrats hold		Swing	▼11.8	

=== Bushey Park ===
Bushey Park
Party	Candidate	Votes	%	±%
Conservative	Spencer Pitfield*	842	56.0	+10.8
Liberal Democrats	Vincent Turner	550	36.6	–10.3
Labour	James Sowerbutts	111	7.4	–0.5
Majority		292	19.4	N/A
Turnout		1,503	46.0	+5.3
Registered electors		3,331		
Conservative hold		Swing	▲10.6	

=== Bushey St. James ===
Bushey St. James
Party	Candidate	Votes	%	±%
Liberal Democrats	Kim Boughton	1,058	46.4	–6.8
Conservative	Carey Keates*	999	43.8	+4.3
Labour	Dinah Hoeksma	223	9.8	+2.4
Majority		59	2.6	–11.1
Turnout		2,280	42.1	+9.1
Registered electors		5,446		
Liberal Democrats gain from Conservative		Swing	▲5.6	

=== Potters Bar Furzefield ===
Potters Bar Furzefield
Party	Candidate	Votes	%	±%
Conservative	Rebecca Foy*	1,080	57.9	–0.2
Liberal Democrats	Colin Dean	443	23.7	+1.5
Labour	James Fisher	343	18.4	–1.4
Majority		637	34.1	–1.7
Turnout		1,866	38.4	=12.4
Registered electors		4,865		
Conservative hold		Swing	▼0.9	

=== Potters Bar Oakmere ===
Potters Bar Oakmere
Party	Candidate	Votes	%	±%
Conservative	Martin Heywood	1,311	68.5	–0.4
Labour	Russell Ramshaw	602	31.5	+0.4
Majority		709	37.1	–0.8
Turnout		1,913	35.7	+10.8
Registered electors		5,577		
Conservative hold		Swing	▼0.4	

=== Potters Bar Parkfield ===
Potters Bar Parkfield
Party	Candidate	Votes	%	±%
Conservative	John Donne*	1,661	68.1	–2.4
Liberal Democrats	John Bonner	445	18.3	–0.5
Labour	Elizabeth Savage	332	13.6	+3.0
Majority		1,216	49.9	–1.9
Turnout		2,438	40.2	+8.2
Registered electors		5,705		
Conservative hold		Swing	▼1.0	

=== Shenley ===
Shenley
Party	Candidate	Votes	%	±%
Conservative	Rodney Saunders*	939	64.8	+9.0
Labour	Anthony Scott-Norman	269	18.6	–25.6
Liberal Democrats	Anita Ownsworth	242	16.7	N/A
Majority		670	46.2	+34.6
Turnout		1,450	36.6	+2.6
Registered electors		3,808		
Conservative hold		Swing	▲17.3	
