= 2004 Blackburn with Darwen Borough Council election =

2004 UK local government election

Results of the 2004 Blackburn with Darwen Borough Council election

Elections to Blackburn with Darwen Borough Council in June 2004 heralded a shock result as Labour council leader Sir Bill Taylor lost his seat to Liberal Democrat Zamir Khan. "This morning as I was shaving I thought I could get beat and that is what happened", commented Taylor after the result. "I canvassed more for this election than for any other. I spoke to more than a thousand people on their doorsteps and was not given any suggestion there were any difficulties." Liberal Democrat leader Paul Browne blamed the defeat on dissatisfaction with British foreign policy, particularly in areas with high numbers of Muslim voters: "Sir Bill has gone because of what has happened in Iraq. Simple." Only 63 of the 64 seats on the council were filled as the Earcroft ward by-election took place a month after due to the death of Mayor Mike Barratt. Yusuf Sidat was elected as an independent in Queen's Park Ward.

== Election result ==
Summary of the 10 June 2004 local election results for Blackburn with Darwen Council
Parties	Seats	Previous	Net Gain/Loss
Labour	33	35	-2
Conservative	17	15	+2
Liberal Democrats	12	8	+4
Independent	1	2	-1
Total	63	60	

== Wards ==
=== Corporation Park ===
Elected

- Arshid Mahmood (Lab) 790
- Paul James McGurty (Con) 734
- Abdul Rehman (LD) 884

Electorate 4617 Ballot Papers 2781 % Poll 60.23
