= 2004 Newcastle-under-Lyme Borough Council election =

Results of the 2004 Newcastle-under-Lyme Borough Council election

Elections to Newcastle-under-Lyme Borough Council were held on 10 June 2004. One third of the council was up for election and the Labour Party gained overall control of the council from no overall control.

After the election, the composition of the council was:

- Labour 31
- Conservative 14
- Liberal Democrat 14
- Caring Party 1

== Election result ==
Newcastle-under-Lyme local election result 2004
Party	Seats	Gains	Losses	Net gain/loss	Seats %	Votes %	Votes	+/−
Labour	11	3	1	+2	47.8	37.0	11,568	+0.1%
Liberal Democrats	6	0	4	-4	26.1	33.3	10,403	+2.0%
Conservative	6	2	0	+2	26.1	27.7	8,676	-0.4%
Independent	0	0	0	0	0	0.8	237	+0.7%
Caring Party	0	0	0	0	0	0.7	222	-2.4%
Green	0	0	0	0	0	0.6	177	+0.2%

== Ward results ==
Audley and Bignall End (2)
Party	Candidate	Votes	%	±%
Liberal Democrats	Ian Wilkes	760		
Labour	Ann Beech	759		
Liberal Democrats	Cornes Dylis	754		
Labour	Dennis McIntosh	630		
Conservative	Robert Edwards	405		
Conservative	Glenys Davies	260		
Turnout		3,568		
Liberal Democrats hold		Swing		
Labour hold		Swing		

Bradwell
Party	Candidate	Votes	%	±%
Labour	John Tatton	870	56.7	−4.0
Conservative	Janet Lefroy	361	23.5	+3.7
Liberal Democrats	Michael Boughey	303	19.8	+0.3
Majority		509	33.2	+2.3
Turnout		1,534		
Labour hold		Swing		

Butt Lane
Party	Candidate	Votes	%	±%
Labour	John Evans	565	47.4	−2.2
Liberal Democrats	Sylvia Burgess	378	31.7	−2.9
Conservative	Pauline Rowley	248	20.8	+5.0
Majority		187	15.7	+0.7
Turnout		1,191		
Labour hold		Swing		

Chesterton (2)
Party	Candidate	Votes	%	±%
Labour	Mick Dolman	589		
Labour	Sandra Simpson	537		
Liberal Democrats	Andrew Cooley	357		
Conservative	Malcolm Moore	272		
Liberal Democrats	Dennis Cornes	208		
Conservative	Clive Moss	174		
Turnout		2,137		
Labour hold		Swing		
Labour hold		Swing		

Clayton
Party	Candidate	Votes	%	±%
Conservative	Ann Heames	557	43.4	
Labour	Richard Gorton	483	37.6	
Liberal Democrats	David Dugdale	244	19.0	
Majority		74	5.8	
Turnout		1,284		
Conservative hold		Swing		

Cross Heath
Party	Candidate	Votes	%	±%
Labour	Sylvia Butler	727	54.3	−5.5
Conservative	John Tagg	264	19.7	+4.9
Liberal Democrats	Leo Hamburger	220	16.4	−1.2
Caring Party	Johnathon Ackerley	128	9.6	+1.8
Majority		463	34.6	−7.6
Turnout		1,339		
Labour hold		Swing		

Halmerend (2)
Party	Candidate	Votes	%	±%
Liberal Democrats	Olwyn Speed	776		
Liberal Democrats	David Becket	738		
Labour	Trevor Sproston	368		
Labour	Andrew Williams	360		
Turnout		2,242		
Liberal Democrats hold		Swing		
Liberal Democrats hold		Swing		

Holditch
Party	Candidate	Votes	%	±%
Labour	Vic Finnemore	524	65.8	
Liberal Democrats	Julian Colclough	272	34.2	
Majority		252	31.6	
Turnout		796		
Labour hold		Swing		

Kidsgrove
Party	Candidate	Votes	%	±%
Labour	Margaret Astle	892	62.2	+7.5
Liberal Democrats	Ephriam Daniels	301	21.0	−13.7
Conservative	Edward Lowe	242	16.9	+6.3
Majority		591	41.2	+21.2
Turnout		1,435		
Labour hold		Swing		

Loggerheads and Whitmore
Party	Candidate	Votes	%	±%
Conservative	Freda Myatt	1,525	70.7	−2.6
Liberal Democrats	Bryan Kirkham	404	18.7	+8.2
Labour	Helen Sproston	228	10.6	−5.7
Majority		1,121	52.0	−5.0
Turnout		2,157		
Conservative hold		Swing		

May Bank
Party	Candidate	Votes	%	±%
Conservative	Ian Matthews	913	48.4	+3.9
Liberal Democrats	Edward Coxon	557	29.5	−3.5
Labour	Stephen Harrison	417	22.1	−0.3
Majority		356	18.9	+7.4
Turnout		1,887		
Conservative gain from Liberal Democrats		Swing		

Newchapel
Party	Candidate	Votes	%	±%
Labour	Edward Chrzanowski	352	38.8	+9.8
Liberal Democrats	Maurica Leese	319	35.1	+4.0
Independent	Michael Prosser	237	26.1	+26.1
Majority		33	3.7	
Turnout		908		
Labour gain from Liberal Democrats		Swing		

Porthill
Party	Candidate	Votes	%	±%
Conservative	John Cooper	461	41.9	
Labour	Colin Higginson	442	40.2	
Liberal Democrats	Emma Cooley	196	17.8	
Majority		19	1.7	
Turnout		1,099		
Conservative gain from Labour		Swing		

Ravenscliffe
Party	Candidate	Votes	%	±%
Labour	Gillian Burnett	443	45.3	+1.0
Liberal Democrats	Geoffrey Hall	306	31.3	−8.0
Conservative	Jeremy Dodsworth	228	23.3	+6.9
Majority		137	14.0	+9.0
Turnout		977		
Labour gain from Liberal Democrats		Swing		

Seabridge
Party	Candidate	Votes	%	±%
Conservative	Peter Whieldon	725	46.5	+0.4
Labour	David Beardmore	551	35.4	−0.5
Liberal Democrats	Eric Durber	282	18.1	+0.1
Majority		174	11.1	+0.9
Turnout		1,558		
Conservative hold		Swing		

Talke
Party	Candidate	Votes	%	±%
Liberal Democrats	Raymond Slater	515	54.4	−4.0
Labour	Doris Boden	265	28.0	−2.0
Conservative	Stephen Sweeney	166	17.5	+5.9
Majority		250	26.4	−2.0
Turnout		946		
Liberal Democrats hold		Swing		

Thistleberry
Party	Candidate	Votes	%	±%
Liberal Democrats	Marion Reddish	1,026	55.7	−2.3
Conservative	Gerald Cork	437	23.7	−0.1
Labour	William Welsh	285	15.5	−2.8
Caring Party	Geoff Cubley	94	5.1	+5.1
Majority		589	32.0	−2.2
Turnout		1,842		
Liberal Democrats hold		Swing		

Town
Party	Candidate	Votes	%	±%
Liberal Democrats	David Clarke	571	48.3	
Labour	Steve James	392	33.2	
Conservative	Luciana Flackett	152	12.9	
Caring Party	Derick Huckfield	66	5.6	
Majority		179	15.1	
Turnout		1,181		
Liberal Democrats hold		Swing		

Westlands
Party	Candidate	Votes	%	±%
Conservative	Mary Moss	1,007	55.5	−3.5
Liberal Democrats	Hilary Jones	479	26.4	+2.3
Labour	Eileen Robinson	328	18.1	+1.2
Majority		528	29.1	−5.8
Turnout		1,814		
Conservative hold		Swing		

Wolstanton
Party	Candidate	Votes	%	±%
Labour	Mary Olsezewski	561	38.6	−6.9
Liberal Democrats	Trevor Johnson	437	30.1	−2.1
Conservative	Caroline Champion	279	19.2	+3.8
Green	Anne Beirne	177	12.2	+5.3
Majority		124	8.5	−4.8
Turnout		1,454		
Labour gain from Liberal Democrats		Swing		
