= 2004 Broxbourne Borough Council election =

2004 UK local government election

Results of the 2004 Broxbourne Borough Council election

The 2004 Broxbourne Council election was held to elect council members of the Broxbourne Borough Council, the local government authority of the borough of Broxbourne, Hertfordshire, England.

== Composition of expiring seats before election ==
Ward	Party	Incumbent Elected	Incumbent	Standing again?
Broxbourne	Conservative	2000	Donald Poole	No
Bury Green	Conservative	2000	Dorothy Edmonds	No
Cheshunt Central	Conservative	2000	Milan Milovanovic	Yes
Cheshunt North	Conservative	2000	Mark Farrington	Yes
Flamstead End	Conservative	2000	David Manning	Yes
Goffs Oak	Conservative	2002	Russell Thomas	No (Note: Russell Thomas had been elected unopposed in the May 2002 Goffs Oak by-election.)
Hoddesdon North	Conservative	2000	Lyn White	Yes
Hoddesdon Town	Conservative	2002	Robert Bick	Yes (Note: Robert Bick had been elected in the May 2002 Hoddesdon Town by-election.)
Rye Park	Conservative	2000	Peter Swannell	No
Theobalds	Conservative	2000	Charles Tranham	Yes
Waltham Cross	Conservative	2000	Graham Manley	No
Wormley / Turnford	Conservative	2000	Paul Mason	Yes (Note: Paul Mason stood in Broxbourne Ward in 2004.)

== Election results ==
Broxbourne local election result 2004
Party	Seats	Gains	Losses	Net gain/loss	Seats %	Votes %	Votes	+/−
Conservative	12	0	0	0	100.00	66.25	14,321	+5.43
Labour	0	0	0	0	0.00	24.34	5,261	-3.70
BNP	0	0	0	0	0.00	4.84	1,047	-2.47
Liberal Democrats	0	0	0	0	0.00	4.57	989	+0.74

== Results summary ==
An election was held in 12 out of the 13 wards on 10 June 2004. (No election in Rosedale Ward)

All seats were successfully defended by the incumbent party.

The new political balance of the council following this election was:

- Conservative 34 seats
- Labour 2 seats
- British National Party 1 seat
- Independent 1 seat

== Ward results ==
Broxbourne Ward Result 10 June 2004
Party	Candidate	Votes	%	±%
Conservative	Paul Mason	1,338	68.72	+0.48
Liberal Democrats	Kirstie De Rivaz	384	19.72	+2.47
Labour	Marios Kousoulou	225	11.56	−2.95
Majority		954		
Turnout		1,947		
Conservative hold		Swing		

Bury Green Ward Result 10 June 2004
Party	Candidate	Votes	%	±%
Conservative	Martin Kennaugh	1,039	62.18	+3.74
Labour	Alexander McInnes	632	37.82	−3.74
Majority		407		
Turnout		1,671		
Conservative hold		Swing		

Cheshunt Central Ward Result 10 June 2004
Party	Candidate	Votes	%	±%
Conservative	Milan Milovanovic	1,112	52.30	−1.42
BNP	Ian Seeby	425	19.99	+4.04
Labour	Richard Greenhill	340	15.99	−4.05
Liberal Democrats	Michael Gould	249	11.71	+1.43
Majority		687		
Turnout		2,126		
Conservative hold		Swing		

Cheshunt North Ward Result 10 June 2004
Party	Candidate	Votes	%	±%
Conservative	Mark Farrington	977	48.18	+5.18
BNP	Gary Horsley	622	30.67	−0.16
Labour	James Meadows	429	21.15	−5.02
Majority		355		
Turnout		2,028		
Conservative hold		Swing		

Flamstead End Ward Result 10 June 2004
Party	Candidate	Votes	%	±%
Conservative	David Manning	1,256	76.68	−0.45
Labour	Shirley McInnes	382	23.32	+0.45
Majority		874		
Turnout		1,638		
Conservative hold		Swing		

Goffs Oak Ward Result 10 June 2004
Party	Candidate	Votes	%	±%
Conservative	Peter Moule	1,785	83.61	−0.42
Labour	Cherry Robbins	350	16.39	+0.42
Majority		1,435		
Turnout		2,135		
Conservative hold		Swing		

Hoddesdon North Ward Result 10 June 2004
Party	Candidate	Votes	%	±%
Conservative	Lyn White	1,478	80.68	+6.31
Labour	Arthur Hillyard	354	19.32	−6.31
Majority		1,124		
Turnout		1,832		
Conservative hold		Swing		

Hoddesdon Town Ward Result 10 June 2004
Party	Candidate	Votes	%	±%
Conservative	Robert Bick	968	60.84	+4.43
Liberal Democrats	Andrew Porrer	356	22.38	−0.12
Labour	Jamie Bolden	267	16.78	−4.31
Majority		612		
Turnout		1,591		
Conservative hold		Swing		

Rye Park Ward Result 10 June 2004
Party	Candidate	Votes	%	±%
Conservative	Bren Perryman	1003	58.76	+5.44
Labour	Annette Marples	713	41.24	−5.44
Majority		303		
Turnout		1,729		
Conservative hold		Swing		

Theobalds Ward Result 10 June 2004
Party	Candidate	Votes	%	±%
Conservative	Charles Tranham	1,367	76.16	+4.05
Labour	Christopher Simonovitch	428	23.84	−4.05
Majority		939		
Turnout		1,795		
Conservative hold		Swing		

Waltham Cross Ward Result 10 June 2004
Party	Candidate	Votes	%	±%
Conservative	Dennis Clayton	737	52.53	+8.07
Labour	Ronald McCole	666	47.47	−8.07
Majority		71		
Turnout		1,403		
Conservative hold		Swing		

Wormley / Turnford Ward Result 10 June 2004
Party	Candidate	Votes	%	±%
Conservative	Christine Mitchell	1,248	72.43	+3.48
Labour	Edward Hopwood	475	27.57	−3.48
Majority		773		
Turnout		1,723		
Conservative hold		Swing		
