= 2005 United Kingdom elections =

Category Page

Two elections in the United Kingdom took place on 5 May 2005:

- 2005 United Kingdom general election
- 2005 United Kingdom local elections
