= 2004 Rugby Borough Council election =

2004 UK local government election

Results of the 2004 Rugby Borough Council election

Elections to Rugby Borough Council were held on 10 June 2004. One third of the council seats were up for election and the council stayed under no overall control. The number of councillors for each party after the election were Conservative 21, Labour 14, Liberal Democrat 10 and Independent 3.

== Election result ==
Rugby local election result 2004
Party	Seats	Gains	Losses	Net gain/loss	Seats %	Votes %	Votes	+/−
Conservative	9	3	0	+3	56.3	42.1	10,295	+3.4%
Liberal Democrats	4	0	0	0	25.0	31.9	7,816	+5.4%
Labour	3	0	2	-2	18.8	22.7	5,555	-8.7%
Independent	0	0	1	-1	0	3.3	811	-0.1%

== Ward results ==
Admirals
Party	Candidate	Votes	%	±%
Conservative	Peter Butlin	716	44.8	+2.7
Labour	Martin Eversfield	631	39.5	−6.3
Liberal Democrats	Hilda Fletcher	250	15.7	+3.5
Majority		85	5.3	+1.6
Turnout		1,597	37.2	
Conservative gain from Labour		Swing		

Avon and Swift
Party	Candidate	Votes	%	±%
Conservative	Leigh Hunt	613	61.3	
Labour	Jeffrey Coupe	209	20.9	
Liberal Democrats	Mary Andrews	178	17.8	
Majority		404	40.4	
Turnout		1,000	41.7	
Conservative gain from Independent		Swing		

Benn
Party	Candidate	Votes	%	±%
Labour	Keith Cassidy	601	47.4	−7.0
Liberal Democrats	James Hotten	335	26.4	+1.6
Conservative	Christopher Pacey-Day	333	26.0	+5.1
Majority		266	21.0	−8.6
Turnout		1,269	26.8	
Labour hold		Swing		

Bilton
Party	Candidate	Votes	%	±%
Conservative	Craig Humphrey	1,109	61.7	+1.4
Liberal Democrats	Beatrice O'Dwyer	356	19.8	+1.3
Labour	Benjamin Ferrett	333	18.5	−2.8
Majority		753	41.9	+2.9
Turnout		1,512	43.3	
Conservative hold		Swing		

Caldecott
Party	Candidate	Votes	%	±%
Liberal Democrats	Gwendoline Hotten	875	48.4	+0.2
Conservative	Ian Smith	695	38.4	+3.2
Labour	Brenda Clarke	239	13.2	−3.4
Majority		180	10.0	−3.0
Turnout		1,809	44.4	
Liberal Democrats hold		Swing		

Dunchurch and Knightlow
Party	Candidate	Votes	%	±%
Conservative	William Shields	1,085	47.5	−2.2
Liberal Democrats	Sally Ravenhall	984	43.1	+8.9
Labour	Richard Best	215	9.4	+1.5
Majority		101	4.4	−11.1
Turnout		2,284	52.4	
Conservative hold		Swing		

Earl Craven and Wolston
Party	Candidate	Votes	%	±%
Conservative	Heather Timms	1,114	55.1	−7.7
Labour	Douglas Hodkinson	634	31.4	−5.8
Liberal Democrats	Mervyn Leah	272	13.5	+13.5
Majority		480	23.7	−1.9
Turnout		2,020	45.2	
Conservative gain from Labour		Swing		

Eastlands
Party	Candidate	Votes	%	±%
Liberal Democrats	Susan Peach	1,214	67.8	−5.5
Conservative	Kuldip Ranu	370	20.7	+5.2
Labour	Vasanji Chhana	207	11.6	+0.4
Majority		844	47.1	−10.7
Turnout		1,791	42.4	
Liberal Democrats hold		Swing		

Fosse
Party	Candidate	Votes	%	±%
Conservative	Anthony Gillias	856	58.5	
Liberal Democrats	Richard Gunstone	608	41.5	
Majority		248	17.0	
Turnout		1,464	50.0	
Conservative hold		Swing		

Hillmorton
Party	Candidate	Votes	%	±%
Liberal Democrats	Jesstina Upstone	779	38.4	+4.0
Conservative	David Cranham	658	32.4	+1.4
Labour	Michael Hirons	370	18.2	−16.2
Independent	Kathryn Lawrence	223	11.0	+11.0
Majority		121	6.0	+5.9
Turnout		2,030	48.8	
Liberal Democrats hold		Swing		

Lawford and Kings Newnham
Party	Candidate	Votes	%	±%
Conservative	Jane Watson	440	44.9	
Independent	Lilian Pallikaropoulos	246	25.1	
Labour	Patrick Joyce	187	19.1	
Liberal Democrats	Christopher Thoday	108	11.0	
Majority		194	19.8	
Turnout		981	39.0	
Conservative hold		Swing		

New Bilton
Party	Candidate	Votes	%	±%
Labour	Christina Avis	582	38.2	
Conservative	June Hopkins	404	26.5	
Independent	Roy Sandison	342	22.5	
Liberal Democrats	John Upstone	195	12.8	
Majority		178	11.7	
Turnout		1,523	35.4	
Labour hold		Swing		

Newbold
Party	Candidate	Votes	%	±%
Labour	Denham Cavanagh	747	51.4	−3.8
Liberal Democrats	Felicity Bocus	370	25.4	+3.5
Conservative	Sabir Yusuf	337	23.2	+0.3
Majority		377	26.0	−6.3
Turnout		1,454	31.7	
Labour hold		Swing		

Overslade
Party	Candidate	Votes	%	±%
Conservative	Richard Lane	821	51.2	−1.9
Labour	Douglas Hall	479	29.9	−17.0
Liberal Democrats	Dorothy Neville	303	18.9	+18.9
Majority		342	21.3	+15.1
Turnout		1,603	38.2	
Conservative hold		Swing		

Paddox
Party	Candidate	Votes	%	±%
Liberal Democrats	Richard Dodd	829	68.9	+3.5
Conservative	Donald Willis	253	21.0	−0.8
Labour	Mary Webb	121	10.1	−2.7
Majority		576	47.9	+4.3
Turnout		1,203	41.6	
Liberal Democrats hold		Swing		

Wolvey
Party	Candidate	Votes	%	±%
Conservative	David Elson	491	75.4	+13.4
Liberal Democrats	Stanley Williams	160	24.6	+19.4
Majority		331	50.8	+21.6
Turnout		651	41.9	
Conservative hold		Swing		
