= 2004 Mole Valley District Council election =

2004 UK local government election

Results of the 2004 Mole Valley District Council election

Elections to Mole Valley Council were held on 10 June 2004. One third of the council was up for election and the council stayed under no overall control. Overall turnout was 49.8%.

After the election, the composition of the council was:

- Conservative 19
- Liberal Democrat 17
- Independent 5

== Election result ==
Mole Valley local election result 2004
Party	Seats	Gains	Losses	Net gain/loss	Seats %	Votes %	Votes	+/−
Conservative	6			+1	46.2	44.9	10,376	+0.2%
Liberal Democrats	5			+1	38.5	33.9	7,836	-10.7%
Independent	2			-1	15.4	11.2	2,588	+7.1%
Labour	0			-1	0	7.9	1,832	+1.7%
UKIP	0			0	0	1.9	428	+1.9%
Green	0			0	0	0.2	56	-0.1%

== Ward results ==
Ashtead Common
Party	Candidate	Votes	%	±%
Independent	David Howell	818	49.7	−1.7
Conservative	Sylvia Sharland	590	35.8	−5.2
Labour	John Gough	120	7.3	−0.3
UKIP	Robert Cane	119	7.2	+7.2
Majority		228	13.9	+3.5
Turnout		1,647	53.0	

Ashtead Park
Party	Candidate	Votes	%	±%
Independent	Christopher Townsend	847	51.4	−5.7
Conservative	Timothy Ashton	592	35.9	+0.1
UKIP	Beverley Curley	89	5.4	+5.4
Labour	Susan Gilchrist	65	3.9	−0.6
Green	Anthony Cooper	56	3.4	+0.8
Majority		255	15.5	−5.8
Turnout		1,649	52.4	

Ashtead Village
Party	Candidate	Votes	%	±%
Conservative	Christopher Reynolds	951	41.7	−1.0
Independent	Jonathan Whybrow	923	40.5	+0.7
UKIP	Helen Howell	220	9.7	+9.7
Labour	Clive Scott	185	8.1	+2.5
Majority		28	1.2	−1.7
Turnout		2,279	51.1	+11.9

Bookham North
Party	Candidate	Votes	%	±%
Conservative	Clare Curran	1,492	56.7	+3.4
Liberal Democrats	Linda Hulford	1,068	40.6	−6.1
Labour	Nicholas Trier	73	2.8	+2.8
Majority		424	16.1	+9.5
Turnout		2,633	59.9	+9.1

Bookham South
Party	Candidate	Votes	%	±%
Liberal Democrats	Elizabeth Howarth	1,198	52.8	−7.9
Conservative	Jonathan Dalley	988	43.6	+9.0
Labour	Ian James	82	3.6	−1.1
Majority		210	9.2	−16.9
Turnout		2,268	53.2	+9.3

Dorking North
Party	Candidate	Votes	%	±%
Liberal Democrats	Nicola Masters	754	51.8	−2.8
Conservative	Bridget Upton-Taylor	609	41.8	+4.4
Labour	George Helowicz	94	6.5	−1.5
Majority		145	10.0	−7.2
Turnout		1,457	48.5	

Dorking South
Party	Candidate	Votes	%	±%
Liberal Democrats	Christine Phillips	1,257	53.7	−3.8
Conservative	Timothy Philpot	915	39.1	+3.6
Labour	Edmund Watts	168	7.2	+0.2
Majority		342	14.6	−7.4
Turnout		2,340	48.6	+9.5

Fetcham East
Party	Candidate	Votes	%	±%
Conservative	Carolyn Corden	934	65.1	−2.8
Liberal Democrats	Sally Goodman	418	29.1	−3.0
Labour	John Forehead	83	5.8	+5.8
Majority		516	36.0	+0.2
Turnout		1,435	51.2	

Fetcham West
Party	Candidate	Votes	%	±%
Conservative	Emile Aboud	808	53.1	−4.0
Liberal Democrats	James Laxton	628	41.3	+4.9
Labour	Norman Roger	86	5.7	−0.8
Majority		180	11.8	−8.9
Turnout		1,522	50.5	

Holmwoods
Party	Candidate	Votes	%	±%
Liberal Democrats	Michael Howard	996	55.2	−4.4
Conservative	David Mir	649	36.0	+5.0
Labour	Keith Davis	160	8.9	−0.6
Majority		347	19.2	−9.4
Turnout		1,805	40.9	+9.1

Leatherhead North
Party	Candidate	Votes	%	±%
Conservative	Duncan Mountford	511	34.2	+4.5
Liberal Democrats	Helen Webb	492	33.0	+5.0
Labour	Heather Ward	489	32.8	−9.4
Majority		19	1.2	
Turnout		1,492	35.1	+6.8

Leatherhead South
Party	Candidate	Votes	%	±%
Conservative	Rosemary Dickson	845	53.8	−0.7
Liberal Democrats	Michael Slater	530	33.7	−4.8
Labour	Michael Ward	196	12.5	+5.5
Majority		315	20.1	+4.1
Turnout		1,571	51.5	

Westcott
Party	Candidate	Votes	%	±%
Liberal Democrats	Terence Ellis	498	48.9	
Conservative	Madeleine Brooks	492	48.3	
Labour	Anne Helowicz	28	2.8	
Majority		6	0.6	
Turnout		1,018	62.6	
