= 2003 United Kingdom elections =

Various elections were held in the United Kingdom in 2003, including:

- 2003 Scottish Parliament election
- 2003 National Assembly for Wales election
- 2003 United Kingdom local elections
