= 2004 Stroud District Council election =

2004 UK local government election

Results of the 2004 Stroud District Council election

The 2004 Stroud Council election took place on 10 June 2004 to elect members of Stroud District Council in Gloucestershire, England. One third of the council was up for election and the Conservative Party stayed in overall control of the council.

After the election, the composition of the council was:

- Conservative 27
- Labour 11
- Liberal Democrat 6
- Green 4
- Independent 3

== Election result ==
Stroud local election result 2004
Party	Seats	Gains	Losses	Net gain/loss	Seats %	Votes %	Votes	+/−
Conservative	11	1	1	0	61.1	42.0	11,626	+6.4%
Labour	4	0	0	0	22.2	21.1	5,842	-3.5%
Liberal Democrats	2	1	1	0	11.1	19.2	5,306	-1.1%
Green	1	0	0	0	5.6	14.1	3,891	-1.3%
UKIP	0	0	0	0	0	2.5	679	+1.5%
Independent	0	0	0	0	0	1.0	274	-2.1%
English Democrat	0	0	0	0	0	0.2	64	+0.2%

== Ward results ==
Amberley and Woodchester
Party	Candidate	Votes	%	±%
Conservative	Stephen Glanfield	526	56.0	+2.1
Green	Mark Welton	146	15.5	−2.5
Labour	John Appleton	140	14.9	+1.9
Liberal Democrats	John Howe	128	13.6	−1.5
Majority		380	40.4	+4.4
Turnout		940		
Conservative hold		Swing		

Berkeley
Party	Candidate	Votes	%	±%
Conservative	Benjamin Francis	745	50.2	
Labour	Michael Denning	450	30.3	
Liberal Democrats	Graham Lloyd-Jones	170	11.5	
Green	David Michael	118	8.0	
Majority		295	19.9	
Turnout		1,483		
Conservative hold		Swing		

Cainscross
Party	Candidate	Votes	%	±%
Labour	Charles Burling	694	38.7	−9.8
Conservative	Elizabeth Price Jones	507	28.3	+5.6
Liberal Democrats	Wendy Tomlinson	379	21.2	−0.6
Green	John Harris	211	11.8	+4.7
Majority		184	10.4	−15.4
Turnout		1,791		
Labour hold		Swing		

Chalford
Party	Candidate	Votes	%	±%
Conservative	Susan Fellows	880	41.7	−4.8
Green	David Wood	402	19.0	+2.7
Liberal Democrats	John Freeman	325	15.4	+0.7
UKIP	Leslie Banstead	255	12.1	+6.4
Labour	David Taylor	250	11.8	−5.0
Majority		478	22.6	−7.1
Turnout		2,112		
Conservative hold		Swing		

Dursley
Party	Candidate	Votes	%	±%
Labour	Hilary Fowles	667	32.7	+11.4
Conservative	Loraine Patrick	614	30.1	−3.9
Liberal Democrats	Patrick Blitz	473	23.2	−19.3
UKIP	Ronald Bishop	137	6.7	+4.5
Green	Katherine Mundy	83	4.1	+4.1
English Democrat	Robert Howells	64	3.1	+3.1
Majority		53	2.6	
Turnout		2,038		
Labour hold		Swing		

Eastington and Standish
Party	Candidate	Votes	%	±%
Labour	Kenneth Stephens	282	41.1	−6.4
Conservative	Thomas James	270	39.4	+1.0
Green	Valerie Hicken	73	10.6	−3.5
Liberal Democrats	Milner Howe	61	8.9	+8.9
Majority		12	1.7	−7.4
Turnout		686		
Labour hold		Swing		

Hardwicke
Party	Candidate	Votes	%	±%
Conservative	David Tomlins	743	59.9	
Labour	Henrietta Nichols	258	20.8	
Liberal Democrats	Charles Hartley	240	19.3	
Majority		485	39.1	
Turnout		1,241		
Conservative hold		Swing		

Kingswood
Party	Candidate	Votes	%	±%
Liberal Democrats	Paul Hemming	419	51.0	−21.7
Conservative	Owen Inskip	350	42.6	+15.3
Labour	Jean Smalley	52	6.3	+6.3
Majority		69	8.4	−37.1
Turnout		821		
Liberal Democrats hold		Swing		

Minchinhampton
Party	Candidate	Votes	%	±%
Conservative	John Forbes	857	53.0	−6.6
Labour	Rhian Griffiths	285	17.6	−4.5
Liberal Democrats	Colleen Rothwell	221	13.7	−1.3
Green	Oscar Hull	135	8.3	+8.3
UKIP	Adrian Blake	120	7.4	+4.2
Majority		572	35.4	−2.1
Turnout		1,618		
Conservative hold		Swing		

Nailsworth
Party	Candidate	Votes	%	±%
Conservative	Dorcas Binns	812	35.8	+2.7
Green	John Nicholson	721	31.8	−0.2
Labour	Audrey Smith	375	16.5	−5.0
Liberal Democrats	Hilary Howe	191	8.4	−5.0
UKIP	Alan Lomas	167	7.4	+7.4
Majority		91	4.0	+2.9
Turnout		2,266		
Conservative hold		Swing		

Painswick
Party	Candidate	Votes	%	±%
Conservative	Barbara Tait	1,112	55.4	
Green	Martin Sherrard	457	22.8	
Liberal Democrats	David Harcup	310	15.5	
Labour	Andrew Read	127	6.3	
Majority		655	32.7	
Turnout		2,006		
Conservative hold		Swing		

Rodborough
Party	Candidate	Votes	%	±%
Conservative	Robert Sinfield	471	30.9	−8.3
Green	Penelope Wildgoose	407	26.7	−5.2
Independent	Charles Townley	274	18.0	+18.0
Labour	Martin Alder	254	16.7	−5.5
Liberal Democrats	Darren Jones	118	7.7	+1.0
Majority		64	4.2	−3.2
Turnout		1,524		
Conservative hold		Swing		

Severn
Party	Candidate	Votes	%	±%
Conservative	Norman Smith	827	53.1	
Liberal Democrats	Michael Stayte	453	29.1	
Labour	John Greenwood	277	17.8	
Majority		374	24.0	
Turnout		1,557		
Conservative hold		Swing		

Stonehouse
Party	Candidate	Votes	%	±%
Labour	Mattie Ross	940	45.6	−1.4
Conservative	Philip Bevan	736	35.7	+0.8
Liberal Democrats	June Snell	206	10.0	+0.5
Green	Clare Sheridan	179	8.7	+0.1
Majority		204	9.9	−2.1
Turnout		2,061		
Labour hold		Swing		

The Stanleys
Party	Candidate	Votes	%	±%
Conservative	Raymond Apperley	672	42.7	
Labour	Karin Degenberg	334	21.2	
Liberal Democrats	Ian Owen	290	18.4	
Green	Thomas Bermingham	279	17.7	
Majority		338	21.5	
Turnout		1,575		
Conservative hold		Swing		

Upton St Leonards
Party	Candidate	Votes	%	±%
Liberal Democrats	Keith Ardron	374	39.2	+39.2
Conservative	Michael Beard	372	39.0	−18.4
Green	Peter Adams	116	12.2	−10.4
Labour	Campbell Smith	92	9.6	−10.3
Majority		2	0.2	
Turnout		954		
Liberal Democrats gain from Conservative		Swing		

Valley
Party	Candidate	Votes	%	±%
Green	Sarah Lunnon	319	48.6	+0.2
Conservative	Jenefer Wythe	174	26.5	+2.8
Labour	Thomas Williams	100	15.2	−3.3
Liberal Democrats	Mark Rogers	64	9.7	+0.4
Majority		145	22.1	−2.6
Turnout		657		
Green hold		Swing		

Wotton-Under-Edge
Party	Candidate	Votes	%	±%
Conservative	Sydney Gowers	958	40.7	−6.5
Liberal Democrats	Christopher Galbraith	884	37.6	−15.2
Labour	Helen Roberts	265	11.3	+11.3
Green	Christopher Dunn	245	10.4	+10.4
Majority		74	3.1	
Turnout		2,352		
Conservative gain from Liberal Democrats		Swing		
