= 2004 Rochford District Council election =

2004 UK local government election

Results of the 2004 Rochford District Council election

Elections to Rochford Council were held on 10 June 2004. One third of the council was up for election and the Conservative party stayed in overall control of the council.

After the election, the composition of the council was:

Party	Seats	±
Conservative	32	+2
Liberal Democrat	4	0
Independent	2	0
Labour	1	-2
Hawkwell Residents	1	0

== Election result ==
Rochford local election result 2004
Party	Seats	Gains	Losses	Net gain/loss	Seats %	Votes %	Votes	+/−
Conservative	14	2	0	+2	100.0	62.3	9,370	+13.6%
Labour	0	0	2	-2	0	18.6	2,799	-4.3%
Green	0	0	0	0	0	10.4	1,565	+6.9%
Liberal Democrats	0	0	0	0	0	8.7	1,305	-9.7%

3 Conservative candidates were unopposed.

== Ward results ==
=== Ashingdon and Canewdon ===
Ashingdon and Canewdon
Party	Candidate	Votes	%	±%
Conservative	Terence Cutmore	714	56.5	+3.3
Green	Andrew Vaughan	384	30.4	+16.6
Labour	John Dickson	166	13.1	+2.3
Majority		330	26.1	−4.9
Turnout		1,264	37.0	+11.3
Conservative hold		Swing		

=== Foulness and Great Wakering ===
Foulness and Great Wakering
Party	Candidate	Votes	%	±%
Conservative	Barbara Wilkins	903	59.1	+11.6
Labour	Graham Fox	626	40.9	−2.7
Majority		277	18.2	+14.3
Turnout		1,529	35.7	+8.6
Conservative hold		Swing		

=== Hockley Central ===
Hockley Central (2)
Party	Candidate	Votes	%	±%
Conservative	Jeremy Thomass	1,203		
Conservative	Caroline Weston	1,107		
Green	Gabrielle Yeadell	415		
Labour	David Thompson	366		
Labour	Dorothy Thompson	353		
Turnout		3,444	38.1	
Conservative hold		Swing		
Conservative hold		Swing		

=== Hockley North ===
Hockley North
Party	Candidate	Votes	%	±%
Conservative	Colin Hungate	473	76.8	+12.7
Labour	Stephen Hinde	143	23.2	+23.2
Majority		330	53.6	+25.4
Turnout		616	38.8	
Conservative hold		Swing		

=== Hockley West ===
Hockley West
Party	Candidate	Votes	%	±%
Conservative	Liv Hungate	unopposed		
Conservative hold		Swing		

=== Hullbridge ===
Hullbridge
Party	Candidate	Votes	%	±%
Conservative	Peter Robinson	1,040	53.5	+0.7
Labour	Michael Hoy	520	26.7	−20.5
Green	Robin Hume	385	19.8	+19.8
Majority		520	26.8	+21.2
Turnout		1,945	36.8	+15.1
Conservative gain from Labour		Swing		

=== Lodge ===
Lodge
Party	Candidate	Votes	%	±%
Conservative	David Merrick	704	64.9	+12.6
Green	Neil Kirsh	381	35.1	+35.1
Majority		323	29.8	+25.2
Turnout		1,085	35.0	+12.3
Conservative hold		Swing		

=== Rayleigh Central ===
Rayleigh Central
Party	Candidate	Votes	%	±%
Conservative	Antony Humphries	unopposed		
Conservative hold		Swing		

=== Rochford ===
Rochford
Party	Candidate	Votes	%	±%
Conservative	Keith Gordon	957	60.5	
Labour	Myra Weir	625	39.5	
Majority		332	21.0	
Turnout		1,582	31.0	+8.1
Conservative gain from Labour		Swing		

=== Sweyne Park ===
Sweyne Park
Party	Candidate	Votes	%	±%
Conservative	Gerald Mockford	unopposed		
Conservative hold		Swing		

=== Trinity ===
Trinity
Party	Candidate	Votes	%	±%
Conservative	Keith Gibbs	722	59.4	
Liberal Democrats	Keith Budden	494	40.6	
Majority		228	18.8	
Turnout		1,216	43.6	
Conservative hold		Swing		

=== Wheatley ===
Wheatley
Party	Candidate	Votes	%	±%
Conservative	John Pullen	815	68.5	
Liberal Democrats	Mark Pearson	375	31.5	
Majority		440	37.0	
Turnout		1,190	38.1	
Conservative hold		Swing		

=== Whitehouse ===
Whitehouse
Party	Candidate	Votes	%	±%
Conservative	Simon Smith	732	62.7	
Liberal Democrats	Elena Black	436	37.3	
Majority		296	25.4	
Turnout		1,168	38.8	
Conservative hold		Swing		
