= 2004 West Lindsey District Council election =

2004 UK local government election

Elections to West Lindsey District Council were held on 10 June 2004. One third of the council was up for election and the Conservative Party gained overall control of the council from no overall control.

After the election, the composition of the council was:

- Conservative 19
- Liberal Democrat 16
- Independent 2

== Election result ==
West Lindsey local election result 2004
Party	Seats	Gains	Losses	Net gain/loss	Seats %	Votes %	Votes	+/−
Liberal Democrats	9	1	0	+1	69.2	53.7	10,412	+27.1%
Conservative	4	2	1	+1	30.8	35.7	6,928	-2.3%
Labour	0	0	0	0	0	5.6	1,084	-8.6%
Independent	0	0	2	-2	0	4.9	959	-15.9%

One Conservative candidate was unopposed.

== Ward results ==
Caistor
Party	Candidate	Votes	%	±%
Conservative	Angela Lawrence	705	61.5	+29.6
Independent	Norman Hancock	441	38.5	−21.3
Majority		264	23.0	−4.9
Turnout		1,146	44.7	+7.6
Conservative gain from Independent		Swing		

Cherry Willingham
Party	Candidate	Votes	%	±%
Liberal Democrats	Adrian Heath	1,209	65.1	+31.9
Conservative	Keith Deeley	649	34.9	−18.8
Majority		560	30.2	+9.7
Turnout		1,858	56.5	+14.9
Liberal Democrats hold		Swing		

Dunholme
Party	Candidate	Votes	%	±%
Conservative	Susan Rawlins	unopposed		
Conservative hold		Swing		

Gainsborough East
Party	Candidate	Votes	%	±%
Liberal Democrats	Michael Tinker	774	48.3	−25.3
Labour	Deborah Rose	551	34.4	+34.4
Conservative	Marc Bratcher	276	17.2	−9.2
Majority		223	13.9	−33.3
Turnout		1,601	35.3	+17.3
Liberal Democrats hold		Swing		

Gainsborough North
Party	Candidate	Votes	%	±%
Liberal Democrats	James Snee	765	37.7	+6.8
Conservative	Paul Howitt-Cowan	489	24.1	−18.6
Independent	Harry Clarke	417	20.6	+20.6
Labour	John Indian	356	17.6	−8.8
Majority		276	13.6	
Turnout		2,027	41.1	+15.3
Liberal Democrats hold		Swing		

Gainsborough South-West
Party	Candidate	Votes	%	±%
Liberal Democrats	Trevor Young	690	58.0	−6.9
Conservative	Donald Sweeting	221	18.6	+6.9
Labour	Catherine Dobson	177	14.9	+14.9
Independent	William Gabbott	101	8.5	−14.9
Majority		469	39.4	−2.1
Turnout		1,189	35.7	+10.0
Liberal Democrats hold		Swing		

Market Rasen
Party	Candidate	Votes	%	±%
Liberal Democrats	David Kitchen	927	54.5	+12.8
Conservative	Carol Skye	774	45.5	−3.0
Majority		153	9.0	+2.2
Turnout		1,701	35.7	+4.6
Liberal Democrats hold		Swing		

Nettleham
Party	Candidate	Votes	%	±%
Liberal Democrats	Malcolm Leaning	1,278	64.7	+64.7
Conservative	Kenneth Davidson	696	35.3	+10.1
Majority		582	29.4	−20.2
Turnout		1,974	55.4	+19.8
Liberal Democrats hold		Swing		

Saxilby
Party	Candidate	Votes	%	±%
Liberal Democrats	David Cotton	1,506	76.8	+76.8
Conservative	William Morgan	455	23.2	−27.5
Majority		1,051	53.6	
Turnout		1,961	50.9	+22.1
Liberal Democrats hold		Swing		

Scotter
Party	Candidate	Votes	%	±%
Conservative	William Parry	850	54.2	−20.1
Liberal Democrats	Triloki Mehrota	719	45.8	+20.1
Majority		131	8.4	−40.2
Turnout		1,569	46.1	+9.6
Conservative hold		Swing		

Stow
Party	Candidate	Votes	%	±%
Liberal Democrats	Reginald Shore	810	78.2	+7.2
Conservative	Stephen Beer	226	21.8	−7.2
Majority		584	56.4	+14.4
Turnout		1,036	56.5	+9.2
Liberal Democrats hold		Swing		

Sudbrooke
Party	Candidate	Votes	%	±%
Conservative	Stuart Curtis	656	57.5	
Liberal Democrats	Roy Harris	484	42.5	
Majority		172	15.0	
Turnout		1,140	56.0	
Conservative gain from Independent		Swing		

Welton
Party	Candidate	Votes	%	±%
Liberal Democrats	Roger Hiscox	1,250	57.3	+57.3
Conservative	Charles Ireland	931	42.7	+42.7
Majority		319	14.6	
Turnout		2,181	52.9	+19.3
Liberal Democrats gain from Conservative		Swing		
