= 2004 Watford Borough Council election =

2004 UK local government election

Results of the 2004 Watford Borough Council election

Elections to Watford Borough Council were held on 10 June 2004. One third of the council was up for election and the Liberal Democrat party kept overall control of the council. Overall turnout was 39.3%.

After the election, the composition of the council was:

- Liberal Democrat 26
- Labour 4
- Conservative 4
- Green 2

== Council election result ==
Watford local election result 2004
Party	Seats	Gains	Losses	Net gain/loss	Seats %	Votes %	Votes	+/−
Liberal Democrats	10			+6	83.3	44.5	10,514	-4.7%
Conservative	1			-3	8.3	25.9	6,118	+4.5%
Green	1			+1	8.3	10.5	2,473	+2.0%
Labour	0			-4	0	19.1	4,516	-0.9%

== Ward results ==
Callowland
Party	Candidate	Votes	%	±%
Green	Kenneth Brodhurst	1,034	57.3	+3.9
Labour	Richard Short	309	17.1	+4.8
Liberal Democrats	Paul Salter	256	14.2	−15.0
Conservative	Jonathan Cordell	207	11.5	+6.4
Majority		725	40.2	+16.0
Turnout		1,806	36.6	

Central
Party	Candidate	Votes	%	±%
Liberal Democrats	Rabi Martins	820	50.1	−4.4
Labour	Nnagbogu Akubue	323	19.7	−6.2
Conservative	Geoffrey Greenstreet	293	17.9	+5.9
Green	Ruth Atkin	200	12.2	+7.4
Majority		497	30.4	+1.8
Turnout		1,636	32.7	

Holywell
Party	Candidate	Votes	%	±%
Liberal Democrats	Jennifer McGovern	770	42.1	−8.7
Labour	Nigel Bell	750	41.0	+0.9
Conservative	Carole Bamford	203	11.1	+4.8
Green	Martin Wiesner	106	5.8	+4.5
Majority		20	1.1	−9.6
Turnout		1,829	35.9	

Leggatts
Party	Candidate	Votes	%	±%
Liberal Democrats	Khalid Mahmood	838	42.5	−3.5
Conservative	Stephen O'Brien	654	33.1	+1.9
Labour	Andrew Head	320	16.2	−0.7
Green	Christine Stockwell	162	8.2	+2.3
Majority		184	9.4	−5.4
Turnout		1,974	38.0	

Meriden
Party	Candidate	Votes	%	±%
Liberal Democrats	Janice Brown	790	41.8	−9.5
Labour	Linda Smith	580	30.7	+0.7
Conservative	Richard Southern	382	20.2	+9.8
Green	Jenny Woods	138	7.3	+5.3
Majority		210	11.1	−10.2
Turnout		1,890	36.3	

Nascot
Party	Candidate	Votes	%	±%
Conservative	Andrew Mortimer	1,285	54.4	+5.0
Liberal Democrats	Mark Watkin	660	28.0	−8.0
Labour	Thomas Meldrum	273	11.6	+1.9
Green	Carole Skinner	143	6.1	+1.2
Majority		625	26.4	+13.0
Turnout		2,361	44.2	

Oxhey
Party	Candidate	Votes	%	±%
Liberal Democrats	Anthony Poole	1,269	64.1	−4.3
Conservative	David Ealey	433	21.9	+3.4
Labour	Michael Jones	180	9.1	−0.3
Green	Clive Skinner	99	5.0	+1.2
Majority		839	42.2	−7.7
Turnout		1,981	41.2	

Park
Party	Candidate	Votes	%	±%
Liberal Democrats	George Derbyshire	1,358	51.7	+4.2
Conservative	David Wright	1,025	39.0	−3.6
Labour	Mavis Tyrwhitt	153	5.8	−0.4
Green	Elaine Edwards	93	3.5	−0.2
Majority		333	12.7	+7.8
Turnout		2,629	53.2	

Stanborough
Party	Candidate	Votes	%	±%
Liberal Democrats	Andrew Wylie	1,023	55.4	−10.3
Conservative	Roger Frost	454	24.6	+7.7
Labour	Geoffrey Cullen	257	13.9	−1.1
Green	Kevin Pettifer	112	6.1	+3.7
Majority		569	30.8	−18.0
Turnout		1,846	36.8	

Tudor
Party	Candidate	Votes	%	±%
Liberal Democrats	Hugh O'Hanlon	999	50.4	+12.1
Conservative	Richard Bamford	586	29.6	−4.5
Labour	Frances Hince	276	13.9	−9.8
Green	Anna Rackett	121	6.1	+2.2
Majority		413	20.8	+16.6
Turnout		1,982	43.6	

Vicarage
Party	Candidate	Votes	%	±%
Liberal Democrats	Mohammed Ajab	848	40.6	−10.4
Labour	Jagtar Dhindsa	786	37.7	+5.0
Conservative	Mark Bunn	286	13.7	+5.0
Green	David Degen	167	8.0	+0.5
Majority		62	2.9	−15.4
Turnout		2,087	41.0	

Woodside
Party	Candidate	Votes	%	±%
Liberal Democrats	Ian Brown	883	55.2	−5.1
Conservative	William Hodnett	310	19.4	+8.1
Labour	Marion Chambers	309	19.3	−5.5
Green	Sally Ivins	98	6.1	+2.6
Majority		573	35.8	+0.3
Turnout		1,600	32.2	
