= 2004 Cambridge City Council election =

2004 UK local government election

Map of the results

The 2004 Cambridge City Council election to the Cambridge City Council took place in 2004. Due to ward boundary changes, the whole council was up for election rather than the normal one-third.

== Result Summary ==
2004 Cambridge City Council election
Party	This election			Full council			This election		
Party	Seats	Net	Seats %	Other	Total	Total %	Votes	Votes %	+/−
Liberal Democrats	28	▲3	66.7	0	28	66.7	36,586	41.3	+0.1
Labour	13	▼2	31.0	0	13	31.0	22,952	25.9	-0.2
Conservative	1	▼1	2.4	0	1	2.4	19,654	22.2	-1.3
Green	0	Steady	0.0	0	0	0.0	7,794	8.8	+0.8
Independent	0	Steady	0.0	0	0	0.0	809	0.9	N/A
UKIP	0	Steady	0.0	0	0	0.0	741	0.8	±0.0

== Ward results ==
=== Abbey ===
Abbey
Party	Candidate	Votes	%
Labour	John Durrant	725	41.8
Labour	Caroline Hart	615	35.5
Labour	Richard Smith	559	32.2
Conservative	Richard Dutton	388	22.4
Liberal Democrats	Helen Elsom	360	20.8
Liberal Democrats	Edward Sexton	330	19.0
Green	Heather Macbeth-Hornett	322	18.6
Conservative	Simon Mitton	322	18.6
Conservative	Magnus Gittins	317	18.3
Green	Margaret Wright	280	16.1
Liberal Democrats	Marcus Streets	279	16.1
Turnout		1,734	27.8
Labour hold			
Labour hold			
Labour hold			

=== Arbury ===
Arbury
Party	Candidate	Votes	%
Liberal Democrats	Rhordi James	1,167	40.0
Liberal Democrats	Anthony Hymans	1,004	34.4
Liberal Democrats	Timothy Ward	976	33.4
Labour	Michael Todd-Jones	908	31.1
Labour	Ian Kidman	900	30.8
Labour	Janet Robertson-Forrest	777	26.6
Conservative	Robert Boorman	699	23.9
Conservative	Rhona Boorman	662	22.7
Conservative	Shapour Meftah	544	18.6
Green	Edwina Wood	459	15.7
Turnout		2,921	43.2
Liberal Democrats hold			
Liberal Democrats gain from Labour			
Liberal Democrats hold			

=== Castle ===
Castle
Party	Candidate	Votes	%
Liberal Democrats	Marie-Louise Holland	1,130	52.0
Liberal Democrats	John Hipkin	1,112	51.2
Liberal Democrats	Simon Kightley	1,011	46.5
Conservative	Jacqueline Mitton	487	22.4
Conservative	Janet Webb	459	21.1
Green	Stephen Lawrence	436	20.1
Conservative	Charles Pilkington	434	20.0
Labour	Jane Jacks	403	18.5
Labour	Christopher Hemming	320	14.7
Labour	Duncan Rayner	272	12.5
Turnout		2,173	33.1
Liberal Democrats hold			
Liberal Democrats hold			
Liberal Democrats hold			

=== Cherry Hinton ===
Cherry Hinton
Party	Candidate	Votes	%
Labour	Robert Dryden	1,275	43.9
Labour	Russel McPherson	1,057	36.4
Conservative	Eric Barrett-Payton	1,027	35.3
Conservative	Christopher Howell	1,014	34.9
Conservative	Graham Palmer	983	33.8
Labour	Stuart Newbold	938	32.3
Liberal Democrats	Geoffrey Heathcock	556	19.1
Liberal Democrats	Ben Hutchings	400	13.8
Liberal Democrats	Simon Rodgers	350	12.0
Green	Neil Ford	242	8.3
Turnout		2,907	46.4
Labour hold			
Labour gain from Conservative			
Conservative hold			

=== Coleridge ===
Coleridge
Party	Candidate	Votes	%
Labour	Bernaneth Callaghan	782	36.6
Labour	Jeremy Benstead	753	35.2
Labour	Lewis Herbert	743	34.7
Conservative	Edward Macnaghten	512	23.9
Conservative	Steven Mastin	511	23.9
Liberal Democrats	Andrew Blackhurst	490	22.9
Liberal Democrats	Rebecca Folley	477	22.3
Conservative	Monica Waters	469	21.9
Liberal Democrats	Thomas Yates	372	17.4
Green	James Grinham	340	15.9
UKIP	Albert Watts	187	8.7
Turnout		2,139	37.1
Labour hold			
Labour hold			
Labour hold			

=== East Chesterton ===
East Chesterton
Party	Candidate	Votes	%
Liberal Democrats	Jennifer Bailey	913	41.5
Liberal Democrats	Jennifer Liddle	859	39.0
Liberal Democrats	Donald Adey	800	36.3
Labour	Pat Johnston	648	29.4
Labour	Geraldine Bird	616	28.0
Labour	Sarah Woodall	581	26.4
Conservative	Marvin Goode	392	17.8
Green	Peter Pope	369	16.8
Conservative	Louise Cadwallader	353	16.0
Conservative	Tina Goode	334	15.2
UKIP	Barry Hudson	229	10.4
Turnout		2,201	37.1
Liberal Democrats hold			
Liberal Democrats hold			
Liberal Democrats hold			

=== King's Hedges ===
King's Hedges
Party	Candidate	Votes	%
Labour	Louise Downham	558	32.7
Labour	Elizabeth Hughes	550	32.2
Labour	Maria Bell	524	30.7
Conservative	Peter Langley	474	27.8
Liberal Democrats	Michael Pitt	449	26.3
Liberal Democrats	Philip Rodgers	424	24.8
Liberal Democrats	Neale Upstone	407	23.8
Conservative	Hugh Mennie	369	21.6
Green	Gerhard Goldbeck-Wood	244	14.3
Green	Geraldine Roper	244	14.3
Turnout		1,708	27.6
Labour hold			
Labour hold			
Labour hold			

=== Market ===
Market
Party	Candidate	Votes	%
Liberal Democrats	Joye Rosenstiel	824	41.3
Liberal Democrats	Michael Dixon	813	40.8
Liberal Democrats	Colin Rosenstiel	781	39.2
Conservative	Timothy Haire	367	18.4
Conservative	John Ionides	357	17.9
Green	Martin Lucas-Smith	344	17.3
Conservative	Alan Mendoza	339	17.0
Green	Daniel Scott	325	16.3
Independent	Adrian Brink	263	13.2
Green	Michael Smith	245	12.3
Independent	John Burnett	232	11.6
Independent	Sylvia Lynn-Meaden	225	11.3
Labour	Elizabeth Walter	219	11.0
Labour	Damian Counsell	206	10.3
Labour	Donald McCallum	193	9.7
Turnout		1,994	29.9
Liberal Democrats hold			
Liberal Democrats hold			
Liberal Democrats hold			

=== Newnham ===
Newnham
Party	Candidate	Votes	%
Liberal Democrats	Sian Reid	1,018	51.1
Liberal Democrats	Julie Smith	931	46.7
Liberal Democrats	Roderick Cantrill	904	45.4
Conservative	Peter Harding-Rolls	429	21.5
Conservative	Gail Kenney	411	20.6
Green	Anna Gomori-Woodcock	400	20.1
Conservative	Anna Hodge	395	19.8
Labour	Rita Gaggs	317	15.9
Labour	Richard Layfield	288	14.5
Green	William Quinn	282	14.1
Labour	Daniel Sternberg	279	14.0
Turnout		1,993	31.6
Liberal Democrats hold			
Liberal Democrats hold			
Liberal Democrats hold			

=== Petersfield ===
Petersfield
Party	Candidate	Votes	%
Labour	Benjamin Bradnack	797	36.1
Liberal Democrats	Victoria Phillips	787	35.7
Labour	Kevin Blencowe	770	34.9
Liberal Democrats	Thomas Mortimer	727	33.0
Labour	Tricia Wright	709	32.1
Liberal Democrats	Jonathan Monroe	673	30.5
Green	John Collins	349	15.8
Green	Ruhul Islam	345	15.6
Green	Shayne Mitchell	341	15.5
Conservative	Rosemary Clarkson	273	12.4
Conservative	Donald Douglas	230	10.4
Conservative	Laurence Tailby	207	9.4
Independent	Bernard Walker	89	4.0
Turnout		2,206	37.1
Labour hold			
Liberal Democrats gain from Labour			
Labour hold			

=== Queen's Edith ===
Queen's Edith
Party	Candidate	Votes	%
Liberal Democrats	Amanda Taylor	1,671	59.8
Liberal Democrats	Richard Stebbings	1,591	57.0
Liberal Democrats	Alan Baker	1,566	56.1
Conservative	Toby Edwards	653	23.4
Conservative	James Ray	550	19.7
Conservative	Mark Hall	531	19.0
Green	Brian Westcott	337	12.1
Labour	Leonard Freeman	277	9.9
Labour	Susan Rosser	256	9.2
Labour	John Kazer	211	7.6
UKIP	Helene Davies	206	7.4
Turnout		2,792	43.6
Liberal Democrats hold			
Liberal Democrats hold			
Liberal Democrats hold			

=== Romsey ===
Romsey
Party	Candidate	Votes	%
Liberal Democrats	Catherine Smart	1,192	47.9
Liberal Democrats	Iain Coleman	1,184	47.6
Liberal Democrats	Sarah Ellis-Miller	1,125	45.2
Labour	Jonathan Goodacre	746	30.0
Labour	Paul Sales	658	26.5
Labour	Benjamin Stafford	577	23.2
Green	Richard Rippin	394	15.8
Green	Vicky Russell	360	14.5
Conservative	Vivian Ellis	206	8.3
Conservative	Margaret Reynolds	186	7.5
Conservative	Rosemary Wheeler	172	6.9
UKIP	Marjorie Barr	119	4.8
Turnout		2,487	39.9
Liberal Democrats hold			
Liberal Democrats hold			
Liberal Democrats hold			

=== Trumpington ===
Trumpington
Party	Candidate	Votes	%
Liberal Democrats	Philippa Slatter	1,186	51.9
Liberal Democrats	Edrich Adigun-Harris	1,177	51.6
Liberal Democrats	Sheila Churchill	1,039	45.5
Conservative	Steven George	778	34.1
Conservative	Andre Beaumont	764	33.5
Conservative	Daniel Whant	679	29.7
Green	Ceri Galloway	346	15.2
Labour	Deborah Allen	192	8.4
Labour	George Tudor	162	7.1
Labour	David Coulson	154	6.7
Turnout		2,283	42.4
Liberal Democrats hold			
Liberal Democrats hold			
Liberal Democrats hold			

=== West Chesterton ===
West Chesterton
Party	Candidate	Votes	%
Liberal Democrats	Ian Nimmo-Smith	1,302	50.7
Liberal Democrats	Diane Armstrong	1,143	44.5
Liberal Democrats	Max Boyce	1,086	42.3
Labour	Paul McHugh	503	19.6
Green	Sarah Peake	481	18.7
Labour	Miriam Lynn	480	18.7
Conservative	Peter Lake	478	18.6
Conservative	James Strachan	463	18.0
Labour	Simon Watkins	454	17.7
Conservative	Ann Watkins	436	17.0
Green	Stephen Peake	309	12.0
Turnout		2,567	40.8
Liberal Democrats hold			
Liberal Democrats hold			
Liberal Democrats hold			
