= 2004 Three Rivers District Council election =

Council election

Results of the 2004 Three Rivers District Council election

Elections to Three Rivers Council were held on 10 June 2004. One third of the council was up for election and the Liberal Democrat party stayed in overall control of the council. Overall turnout was 42.1%.

After the election, the composition of the council was:

- Liberal Democrat 29
- Conservative 12
- Labour 7

== Election result ==
Three Rivers local election result 2004
Party	Seats	Gains	Losses	Net gain/loss	Seats %	Votes %	Votes	+/−
Liberal Democrats	10	2	0	+2	58.8	45.8	10,275	-4.2%
Conservative	4	0	2	-2	23.5	42.9	9,631	+6.9%
Labour	3	0	0	0	17.6	11.3	2,539	-2.7%

== Ward results ==
Abbots Langley
Party	Candidate	Votes	%	±%
Liberal Democrats	David Major	876	60.2	−0.2
Conservative	Ronald Leveridge	389	26.7	+3.6
Labour	Jeannie Metha	190	13.1	−3.5
Majority		487	33.5	−3.8
Turnout		1,455	41.4	+8.7
Liberal Democrats hold		Swing		

Ashridge
Party	Candidate	Votes	%	±%
Labour	David Lake	253	39.5	−21.8
Conservative	Lynda Lewis	214	33.4	+8.3
Liberal Democrats	Laurence McDermott	173	27.0	+13.4
Majority		39	6.1	−30.1
Turnout		640	28.8	+8.9
Labour hold		Swing		

Carpenders Park
Party	Candidate	Votes	%	±%
Liberal Democrats	Geoffrey Dunne	1,154	59.3	+5.6
Conservative	Nigel Stewart	652	33.5	−12.8
Labour	Doreen Johnstone	141	7.2	+7.2
Majority		502	25.8	+18.4
Turnout		1,947	51.3	+16.8
Liberal Democrats gain from Conservative		Swing		

Chorleywood East
Party	Candidate	Votes	%	±%
Conservative	Christopher Haywood	1,058	74.3	+2.6
Liberal Democrats	Rodney Kipps	366	25.7	−2.6
Majority		692	48.6	+5.2
Turnout		1,424	46.1	+11.5
Conservative hold		Swing		

Chorleywood West
Party	Candidate	Votes	%	±%
Liberal Democrats	Harry Davies	1,197	49.4	−1.1
Conservative	Mark Weedon	1,082	44.7	+0.2
Labour	Fiona Goble	142	5.9	+1.0
Majority		115	4.7	−1.3
Turnout		2,421	61.3	+12.4
Liberal Democrats hold		Swing		

Croxley Green
Party	Candidate	Votes	%	±%
Liberal Democrats	Brian Norman	995	54.5	−5.3
Conservative	Colette Hanson	625	34.2	+6.3
Labour	David Wynne-Jones	206	11.3	−1.0
Majority		370	20.3	−11.6
Turnout		1,826	45.0	+12.3
Liberal Democrats hold		Swing		

Hayling
Party	Candidate	Votes	%	±%
Labour	Kerron Cross	395	57.5	+4.5
Conservative	David Benatar	158	23.0	−12.7
Liberal Democrats	Gabriel Aitman	134	19.5	+8.2
Majority		237	34.5	+17.2
Turnout		687	30.6	+10.0
Labour hold		Swing		

Langlebury
Party	Candidate	Votes	%	±%
Liberal Democrats	Christopher Whately-Smith	804	62.5	+2.5
Conservative	Walter Tuck	288	22.4	+3.7
Labour	John Sutton	194	15.1	−6.2
Majority		516	40.1	+1.4
Turnout		1,286	38.5	+10.1
Liberal Democrats hold		Swing		

Leavesden
Party	Candidate	Votes	%	±%
Liberal Democrats	Susan Bartrick	743	59.3	−8.8
Conservative	Andrew Woodard	377	30.1	+11.5
Labour	Peter Arthur	134	10.7	−2.6
Majority		366	29.2	−20.3
Turnout		1,254	34.0	+8.2
Liberal Democrats hold		Swing		

Maple Cross and Mill End
Party	Candidate	Votes	%	±%
Liberal Democrats	Peter Wakeling	898	64.7	+4.3
Conservative	John Hayden	489	35.3	+8.1
Majority		409	29.4	−3.8
Turnout		1,387	37.3	+6.4
Liberal Democrats hold		Swing		

Moor Park and Eastbury
Party	Candidate	Votes	%	±%
Conservative	Amrit Mediratta	1,297	74.6	−1.6
Liberal Democrats	Abudl Vayani	441	25.4	+1.6
Majority		856	49.2	−3.2
Turnout		1,738	43.4	+12.0
Conservative hold		Swing		

Northwick
Party	Candidate	Votes	%	±%
Labour	Leonard Tippen	341	43.4	−10.9
Conservative	Graham Denman	236	30.1	−0.3
Liberal Democrats	David Lowes	208	26.5	+11.2
Majority		105	13.3	−10.6
Turnout		785	27.5	+8.7
Labour hold		Swing		

Oxhey Hall
Party	Candidate	Votes	%	±%
Liberal Democrats	Alison Scarth	462	46.3	+15.5
Conservative	Teresa Paddington	430	43.1	−13.7
Labour	Sheila Bull	106	10.6	−1.7
Majority		32	3.2	
Turnout		998	41.6	+9.9
Liberal Democrats gain from Conservative		Swing		

Penn (2)
Party	Candidate	Votes	%	±%
Liberal Democrats	Sarah Nelmes	492		
Liberal Democrats	Gladstone Providence	491		
Conservative	John Marsh	352		
Conservative	Clifford Le Quelenec	327		
Labour	David Warburton	112		
Labour	Stephen Cox	107		
Turnout		1,881	41.8	
Liberal Democrats hold		Swing		
Liberal Democrats hold		Swing		

Rickmansworth
Party	Candidate	Votes	%	±%
Conservative	David Sansom	812	62.2	
Liberal Democrats	Jeremy Asquith	339	26.0	
Labour	Graham Dale	155	11.9	
Majority		473	36.2	
Turnout		1,306	42.0	+4.5
Conservative hold		Swing		

Rickmansworth West
Party	Candidate	Votes	%	±%
Conservative	Russell Smith	845	59.9	−6.2
Liberal Democrats	Leslie Mead	502	35.6	+8.5
Labour	Joanne Cox	63	4.5	−2.3
Majority		343	24.3	−14.7
Turnout		1,410	51.4	+5.9
Conservative hold		Swing		
