= 2004 St Albans City and District Council election =

2004 UK local government election

Map of the results of the 2004 St Albans City and District Council election. Liberal Democrats in yellow, Conservatives in blue, Labour in red and independent in light grey. Wards in dark grey were not contested in 2004.

The 2004 St Albans City and District Council election took place on 10 June 2004 to elect members of St Albans District Council in Hertfordshire, England. One third of the council was up for election and the council stayed under no overall control.

After the election, the composition of the council was:

- Liberal Democrats 29
- Conservative 17
- Labour 11
- Independent 1

== Background ==
After the last election in 2003 the Liberal Democrats were the largest party on the council with 23 seats, compared to 21 for the Conservatives, 13 for Labour and there was 1 independent. In April 2004 the Liberal Democrats gained a seat from the Conservatives at a by-election in Verulam, which meant they needed to gain 6 seats at the 2004 council election to take a majority on the council. St Albans was reported by national newspapers to be a council that the Liberal Democrats were hoping to win a majority on.

18 seats were contested at the election with only Colney Heath and Sandridge wards not having elections. Candidates from the 3 main parties stood in all 18 wards apart from in Redbourn, where the Liberal Democrats did not put up a candidate to oppose the independent councillor, Tony Swendell, who was standing for re-election. Two other parties put up some candidates, 3 from the new St Albans Party and 2 from the Green Party.

4 Conservative councillors stood down at the election, Mike Bretherton, Mike Jameson, Martin Treasure and Hazel Ward, as well as 1 from Labour, Andrew Rose and 1 Liberal Democrat, John White.

== Election result ==
The results saw the Liberal Democrat make 5 gains but come up one seat short of gaining an overall majority. They gained seats in Ashley and St Peters wards from Labour, and in Marshalswick South, Park Street and Wheathampstead from the Conservatives, to have exactly half of the 58 seats on the council. This reduced the Conservatives to 17 seats and Labour to 11 seats, while independent Anthony Swendell was re-elected in Redbourn.

Following the election the Liberal Democrats took control of the council with all of the seats on the council cabinet after winning a vote 29 to 24, with 1 abstention, despite opposition from both Labour and the Conservatives.

St Albans local election result 2004
Party	Seats	Gains	Losses	Net gain/loss	Seats %	Votes %	Votes	+/−
Liberal Democrats	9	5	0	+5	50.0	38.2	15,235	-5.6%
Conservative	5	0	3	-3	27.8	39.6	15,796	+4.2%
Labour	3	0	2	-2	16.7	17.1	6,826	-3.5%
Independent	1	0	0	0	5.6	3.3	1,310	+3.3%
St Albans Party	0	0	0	0	0	1.1	436	+1.1%
Green	0	0	0	0	0	0.8	310	+0.8%

== Ward results ==
Ashley
Party	Candidate	Votes	%	±%
Liberal Democrats	Michael Ellis	912	41.2	−2.2
Labour	Edward Hill	713	32.2	−2.8
Conservative	Alec Campbell	457	20.6	−1.0
St Albans Party	Peter Cobden	133	6.0	+6.0
Majority		199	9.0	+0.6
Turnout		2,215	44.4	0.0
Liberal Democrats gain from Labour		Swing		

Batchwood
Party	Candidate	Votes	%	±%
Labour	Eleanor Harris	732	37.1	−10.0
Liberal Democrats	Allan Witherick	698	35.3	+9.0
Conservative	Eileen Brown	545	27.6	+1.0
Majority		34	1.8	−18.7
Turnout		1,975	40.1	+2.5
Labour hold		Swing		

Clarence
Party	Candidate	Votes	%	±%
Liberal Democrats	Brian Sinfield	985	47.0	−18.3
Conservative	Lee Foster	514	24.5	+7.5
Labour	David Lee	416	19.9	+2.2
Green	Simon Grover	180	8.6	+8.6
Majority		471	22.5	−25.1
Turnout		2,095	47.1	+1.3
Liberal Democrats hold		Swing		

Cunningham
Party	Candidate	Votes	%	±%
Liberal Democrats	Geoffrey Harrison	1,180	57.2	−4.1
Conservative	James Vessey	542	26.3	+7.5
Labour	Rebecca Gumbrell-Mccormick	340	16.5	−3.4
Majority		638	30.9	−10.5
Turnout		2,062	45.5	−0.7
Liberal Democrats hold		Swing		

Harpenden East
Party	Candidate	Votes	%	±%
Liberal Democrats	Brian Peyton	1,224	50.4	+0.2
Conservative	Nora Kavanaugh	960	39.5	+2.2
Labour	David Crew	245	10.1	−2.4
Majority		264	10.9	−2.0
Turnout		2,429	47.7	+2.2
Liberal Democrats hold		Swing		

Harpenden North
Party	Candidate	Votes	%	±%
Conservative	John Chambers	1,228	56.9	+5.8
Liberal Democrats	Christopher Canfield	707	32.8	−5.6
Labour	Rosemary Ross	223	10.3	−0.2
Majority		521	24.1	+11.4
Turnout		2,158	43.4	+1.8
Conservative hold		Swing		

Harpenden South
Party	Candidate	Votes	%	±%
Conservative	Elizabeth Stevenson	1,480	66.2	+4.5
Liberal Democrats	Nigel Jenkinson	536	24.0	−4.4
Labour	David Lawlor	220	9.8	−0.1
Majority		944	42.2	+8.9
Turnout		2,236	44.3	+1.1
Conservative hold		Swing		

Harpenden West
Party	Candidate	Votes	%	±%
Conservative	John Newman	1,448	57.7	+1.4
Liberal Democrats	Jeffrey Phillips	698	27.8	−4.3
Labour	Elizabeth Rayner	232	9.3	−2.3
Green	Marc Scheimann	130	5.2	+5.2
Majority		750	29.9	+5.7
Turnout		2,508	46.5	+2.9
Conservative hold		Swing		

London Colney
Party	Candidate	Votes	%	±%
Labour	Sean Flynn	881	43.7	−14.0
Conservative	Brian Lee	721	35.8	+10.2
Liberal Democrats	Carol Prowse	414	20.5	+3.8
Majority		160	7.9	−24.2
Turnout		2,016	35.6	+2.4
Labour hold		Swing		

Marshalswick North
Party	Candidate	Votes	%	±%
Liberal Democrats	Jennifer Stroud	1,169	51.8	+3.3
Conservative	John Foster	880	39.0	+1.2
Labour	John Baughan	207	9.2	−4.4
Majority		289	12.8	+2.1
Turnout		2,256	47.5	−3.9
Liberal Democrats hold		Swing		

Marshalswick South
Party	Candidate	Votes	%	±%
Liberal Democrats	Melvyn Teare	1,193	47.1	−6.2
Conservative	Richard Bretherton	1,025	40.5	+7.0
Labour	Sonia Smith	313	12.4	−0.8
Majority		168	6.6	−13.2
Turnout		2,531	51.4	−1.3
Liberal Democrats gain from Conservative		Swing		

Park Street
Party	Candidate	Votes	%	±%
Liberal Democrats	David Yates	1,079	50.4	−7.3
Conservative	Katharine Cramer	795	37.1	+8.8
Labour	Janet Blackwell	266	12.4	−1.7
Majority		284	13.3	−16.1
Turnout		2,140	42.1	+3.3
Liberal Democrats gain from Conservative		Swing		

Redbourn
Party	Candidate	Votes	%	±%
Independent	Anthony Swendell	1,310	63.5	+63.5
Conservative	Susan Walford	578	28.0	−13.4
Labour	Linda Spiri	175	8.5	+0.4
Majority		732	35.5	
Turnout		2,063	45.7	0.0
Independent hold		Swing		

Sopwell
Party	Candidate	Votes	%	±%
Labour	Janet Smith	708	40.0	−9.4
Liberal Democrats	Linda Bateman	532	30.0	+4.8
Conservative	Roderick Douglas	532	30.0	+7.4
Majority		176	10.0	
Turnout		1,772	36.2	+3.8
Labour hold		Swing		

St Peters
Party	Candidate	Votes	%	±%
Liberal Democrats	Martin Morris	987	47.3	+1.2
Labour	Helen Ives-Rose	613	29.4	−6.2
Conservative	Maureen Havard	385	18.5	+0.2
St Albans Party	Vera Tinson	100	4.8	+4.8
Majority		374	17.9	+7.4
Turnout		2,085	41.9	−0.2
Liberal Democrats gain from Labour		Swing		

St Stephen
Party	Candidate	Votes	%	±%
Conservative	David Canham	1,431	60.6	+2.5
Liberal Democrats	David Parry	733	31.0	+1.5
Labour	Jane Cloke	197	8.3	−4.1
Majority		698	29.6	+1.0
Turnout		2,361	47.7	+4.0
Conservative hold		Swing		

Verulam
Party	Candidate	Votes	%	±%
Conservative	Clare Ellis	1,213	45.7	+8.4
Liberal Democrats	Peter Burton	1,051	39.6	−13.0
St Albans Party	Janet Girsman	203	7.6	+7.6
Labour	Larry Heyman	188	7.1	−0.7
Majority		162	6.1	−9.2
Turnout		2,655	53.8	−2.5
Conservative hold		Swing		

Wheathampstead
Party	Candidate	Votes	%	±%
Liberal Democrats	Paul Edelston	1,137	48.3	−11.5
Conservative	Gillian Clark	1,062	45.1	+12.3
Labour	Mary Cheale	157	6.7	−0.7
Majority		75	3.2	−23.8
Turnout		2,356	51.7	+2.8
Liberal Democrats gain from Conservative		Swing		
