= 2004 Oldham Metropolitan Borough Council election =

2004 local election in England

Results of the 2004 Oldham Metropolitan Borough Council election

Elections to Oldham Metropolitan Borough Council were held on 10 June 2004. All seats on the council were contested with boundary changes since the last election in 2003. The Labour Party retained overall control of the council.

After the election, the composition of the council was

- Labour – 32
- Liberal Democrat – 25
- Conservative – 2
- Independent – 1

== Election result ==
Oldham local election result 2004
Party	Seats	Gains	Losses	Net gain/loss	Seats %	Votes %	Votes	+/−
Labour	32					32.7	27,092	
Liberal Democrats	25					28.1	23,276	
Conservative	2					19.1	15,825	
Green	0					8.1	6,670	
BNP	0					5.7	4,754	
Independent	1					4.8	3,999	
UKIP	0					1.5	1,202	

== Ward results ==
=== Alexandra ward ===
Alexandra ward (3)
Party	Candidate	Votes	%	±%
Labour	Hugh McDonald	982	16.8	
Labour	Glynis Shaw	951	16.3	
Labour	Asaf Ali	874	15.0	
Liberal Democrats	Aftab Hussain	619	10.6	
Green	John Roney	518	8.9	
Independent	Chris Wright	458	7.8	
Liberal Democrats	Sakindar Mehmood	457	7.8	
Liberal Democrats	Martin Dinoff	422	7.2	
Conservative	Sarfraz Khan	359	6.1	
Conservative	Harun Miah	203	3.5	
Turnout		5,843		

=== Chadderton Central ward ===
Chadderton Central ward (3)
Party	Candidate	Votes	%	±%
Labour	James Greenwood	1,523	21.6	
Labour	Tony Brownridge	1,315	18.6	
Independent	Sidney Jacobs	1,268	18.0	
Green	Philip Stevens	849	12.0	
Labour	Elizabeth Wrigglesworth	791	11.2	
Liberal Democrats	Stephen Ward	449	6.4	
Liberal Democrats	Alma McInnes	431	6.1	
Liberal Democrats	John McCann	427	6.0	
Turnout		7,053		

=== Chadderton North ward ===
Chadderton North ward (3)
Party	Candidate	Votes	%	±%
Labour	Jeremy Sutcliffe	1,782	22.0	
Labour	Susan Dean	1,403	17.3	
Conservative	Philip Rogers	1,372	16.9	
Labour	Joseph Fitzpatrick	1,293	15.9	
Conservative	Ruman Choudhury	1,006	12.4	
Liberal Democrats	Barbara Beeley	637	7.8	
Liberal Democrats	Keith Taylor	620	7.6	
Turnout		8,113		

=== Chadderton South ward ===
Chadderton South ward (3)
Party	Candidate	Votes	%	±%
Labour	David Hibbert	1,493	24.3	
Labour	David Jones	1,457	23.7	
Labour	Dilys Fletcher	1,089	17.7	
Conservative	Margaret Owens	828	13.5	
Liberal Democrats	Dorothy Shaw	467	7.6	
Liberal Democrats	Philip Renold	403	6.6	
Liberal Democrats	Philip Bagley	401	6.5	
Turnout		6,138		

=== Coldhurst ward ===
Coldhurst ward (3)
Party	Candidate	Votes	%	±%
Labour	Abdul Jabbar	2,328	16.3	
Liberal Democrats	Jilad Miah	2,108	14.8	
Liberal Democrats	Muhammad Uddin	2,059	14.4	
Labour	John Battye	1,966	13.8	
Labour	Wahidur Rahman	1,882	13.2	
Liberal Democrats	Israk Miah	1,382	9.7	
Conservative	Aklaque Hussain	795	5.6	
Conservative	Chondon Miah	596	4.2	
Conservative	Abdul Malik	574	4.0	
Green	Susannah Stevens	562	3.9	
Turnout		14,252		

=== Crompton ward ===
Crompton ward (3)
Party	Candidate	Votes	%	±%
Liberal Democrats	Ann Wingate	1,637	15.1	
Liberal Democrats	Allan Dillon	1,552	14.2	
Liberal Democrats	Philomena Dillon	1,434	13.2	
Conservative	Valerie Pemberton	1,307	12.0	
Conservative	David Dunning	1,279	11.8	
Conservative	Jack Hulme	918	8.4	
Labour	Duncan Davies	750	6.9	
Independent	Michael Hambley	715	6.6	
Labour	Steven Webb	688	6.3	
Labour	Helen Smith	579	5.3	
Turnout		10,859		

=== Failsworth East ward ===
Failsworth East ward (3)
Party	Candidate	Votes	%	±%
Labour	Barbara Dawson	1,780	25.9	
Labour	James McMahon	1,779	25.9	
Labour	Peter Dean	1,351	19.7	
Conservative	Paul Martin	760	11.1	
Green	Warren Bates	561	8.2	
Liberal Democrats	Susan Barratt	221	3.2	
Liberal Democrats	Dorothy Fennell	209	3.0	
Liberal Democrats	Derek Clayton	206	3.0	
Turnout		6,867		

=== Failsworth West ward ===
Failsworth West ward (3)
Party	Candidate	Votes	%	±%
Labour	John Johnson	1,712	21.8	
Labour	Alan Harrison	1,690	21.5	
Labour	Aileen Bell	1,670	21.2	
BNP	Charles Styles	675	8.6	
Conservative	David Crankshaw	628	8.0	
Green	Joan Spencer	548	7.0	
Liberal Democrats	James Ward	449	5.7	
Liberal Democrats	Jill Barrow	285	3.6	
Liberal Democrats	Lesley Schofield	209	2.6	
Turnout		7,866		

=== Hollinwood ward ===
Hollinwood ward (3)
Party	Candidate	Votes	%	±%
Labour	Jean Stretton	1,138	15.8	
Labour	Stephen Williams	1,107	15.3	
Labour	Brian Ames	1,066	14.8	
Liberal Democrats	David Joynes	989	13.7	
Liberal Democrats	Stephen Barrow	837	11.6	
Liberal Democrats	Robert Longley	720	10.0	
Conservative	John Berry	551	7.6	
Conservative	Christopher Shyne	451	6.2	
Green	Peter Robbie	356	4.9	
Turnout		7,215		

=== Medlock Vale ward ===
Medlock Vale ward (3)
Party	Candidate	Votes	%	±%
Labour	Ur Rehman Ateeque	1,526	18.8	
Labour	Gerald Ball	1,379	17.0	
Labour	Jean Jones	1,297	16.0	
Liberal Democrats	Zahid Hussain	723	8.9	
Green	Ian Payne	673	8.3	
Green	Maureen McGuin	578	7.1	
Liberal Democrats	Jason Robinson	556	6.9	
Liberal Democrats	Bronwyn Thackeray	552	6.8	
Independent	Neelofar Rafiq	451	5.6	
Conservative	Hizzur Rahman	369	4.5	
Turnout		8,104		

=== Royton North ward ===
Royton North ward (3)
Party	Candidate	Votes	%	±%
Labour	Bernard Judge	1,740	18.4	
Labour	John Larkin	1,479	15.7	
Labour	Olwen Chadderton	1,370	14.5	
Conservative	Jack Lees	975	10.3	
BNP	Norman Corbett	953	10.1	
Conservative	Kenneth Heeks	728	7.7	
UKIP	David Short	665	7.0	
Green	Margaret Kelly	597	6.3	
Liberal Democrats	Tony Farrell	356	3.8	
Liberal Democrats	Annie Lord	319	3.4	
Liberal Democrats	George Womack	252	2.7	
Turnout		9,434		

=== Royton South ward ===
Royton South ward (3)
Party	Candidate	Votes	%	±%
Labour	Steven Bashforth	1,438	15.5	
Labour	Philip Harrison	1,438	15.5	
Labour	Jill Read	1,112	12.0	
BNP	Anita Corbett	964	10.4	
Conservative	Joseph Farquhar	865	9.3	
Conservative	Allan Fish	745	8.0	
Conservative	Sarah Farquhar	701	7.5	
UKIP	Trevor Hilton	537	5.8	
Liberal Democrats	David Shaw	522	5.6	
Liberal Democrats	Marjorie Solan	345	3.7	
Green	Ben McCarthy	326	3.5	
Liberal Democrats	Kenneth Wingate	288	3.1	
Turnout		9,281		

=== Saddleworth North ward ===
Saddleworth North ward (3)
Party	Candidate	Votes	%	±%
Liberal Democrats	Paul Buckley	1,700	15.8	
Liberal Democrats	Derek Heffernan	1,526	14.2	
Liberal Democrats	Ian McInnes	1,429	13.3	
Conservative	Barbara Jackson	1,124	10.5	
Conservative	Graham Sheldon	1,089	10.1	
Conservative	Ann Gee	1,050	9.8	
Labour	Kenneth Hulme	865	8.0	
Labour	Paul Hickling	738	6.9	
Labour	Paul Fryer	633	5.9	
Green	Andrew Threlfall	587	5.5	
Turnout		10,741		

=== Saddleworth South ward ===
Saddleworth South ward (3)
Party	Candidate	Votes	%	±%
Liberal Democrats	Richard Knowles	1,988	16.6	
Liberal Democrats	Christine Wheeler	1,977	16.5	
Conservative	John Hudson	1,843	15.4	
Liberal Democrats	Valerie Knowles	1,483	12.4	
Conservative	Patricia Byrne	1,473	12.3	
Conservative	Richard Postle	1,288	10.7	
Green	Kay Roney	521	4.3	
Labour	Alastair McGregor	520	4.3	
Labour	Annette Battye	492	4.1	
Labour	Cathryn Ball	390	3.3	
Turnout		11,975		

=== Saddleworth West and Lees ward ===
Saddleworth West and Lees ward (3)
Party	Candidate	Votes	%	±%
Liberal Democrats	Valerie Sedgwick	1,430	14.6	
Liberal Democrats	Brian Lord	1,239	12.6	
Liberal Democrats	Thomas Beeley	1,143	11.7	
Conservative	Elizabeth Boon	946	9.7	
Labour	John McArdle	934	9.5	
Conservative	George Buston	900	9.2	
Labour	Norman Bennett	803	8.2	
Conservative	John Caddick	780	8.0	
Labour	Ann Buscema	678	6.9	
Green	Mark Lees	572	5.8	
Independent	Robert Allsopp	369	3.8	
Turnout		9,794		

=== St James ward ===
St James ward (3)
Party	Candidate	Votes	%	±%
Liberal Democrats	Jaqueline Stanton	1,354	18.4	
Liberal Democrats	James McArdle	1,259	17.1	
Liberal Democrats	Roger Hindle	1,146	15.5	
Labour	Adrian Alexander	808	11.0	
BNP	Michael Treacy	797	10.8	
Labour	Raymond Mallinson	590	8.0	
Labour	Brian Hurst	588	8.0	
Independent	Paul Andrew	440	6.0	
Conservative	Eileen Hulme	388	5.3	
Turnout		7,370		

=== St Marys ward ===
St Marys ward (3)
Party	Candidate	Votes	%	±%
Labour	Riaz Ahmed	1,966	16.4	
Liberal Democrats	Mohammed Masud	1,938	16.1	
Liberal Democrats	Aqeel Salamat	1,711	14.2	
Liberal Democrats	Mohammed Sharif	1,675	13.9	
Labour	Abdul Shah	1,653	13.8	
Labour	Mohammed Azam	1,348	11.2	
Conservative	Nadeem Hussain	1,067	8.9	
Conservative	David Atherton	653	5.4	
Turnout		12,011		

=== Shaw ward ===
Shaw ward (3)
Party	Candidate	Votes	%	±%
Liberal Democrats	Howard Sykes	1,952	20.8	
Liberal Democrats	Angie Farrell	1,773	18.9	
Liberal Democrats	Roderick Blyth	1,694	18.1	
Conservative	David Bentley	716	7.6	
BNP	Alwyn Stott	705	7.5	
Conservative	Kevin Howard	605	6.5	
Conservative	Carole Masters	596	6.4	
Labour	Michael Connolly	476	5.1	
Labour	David Faulkner	476	5.1	
Labour	Lester Chattein	374	4.0	
Turnout		9,367		

=== Waterhead ward ===
Waterhead ward (3)
Party	Candidate	Votes	%	±%
Liberal Democrats	John Anchor	1,643	19.0	
Liberal Democrats	Kay Knox	1,608	18.6	
Liberal Democrats	Lynn Thompson	1,316	15.2	
Labour	James Leyden	981	11.4	
Labour	Christopher Jones	879	10.2	
Labour	Shadab Qumer	877	10.2	
BNP	Martin Brierley	660	7.6	
Conservative	Edna Wolstenhulme	365	4.2	
Independent	Stuart Allsopp	298	3.4	
Turnout		8,627		

=== Werneth ward ===
Werneth ward (3)
Party	Candidate	Votes	%	±%
Labour	Fida Hussain	2,350	20.6	
Liberal Democrats	Khurshid Ahmed	2,094	18.4	
Labour	Shoab Akhtar	1,872	16.4	
Labour	Kamran Ghafoor	1,698	14.9	
Liberal Democrats	Faisal Khan	1,546	13.6	
Liberal Democrats	Keith Pendlebury	1,232	10.8	
Conservative	Paul Stephenson	567	5.0	
Turnout		11,395		
