= 2004 Maidstone Borough Council election =

2004 UK local government election

Results of the 2004 Maidstone District Council election

The 2004 Maidstone Borough Council election took place on 10 June 2004 to elect members of Maidstone Borough Council in Kent, England. One third of the council was up for election and the council stayed under no overall control.

After the election, the composition of the council was:

- Conservative 23
- Liberal Democrat 20
- Labour 9
- Independent 3

== Background ==
Before the election both the Conservative and Liberal Democrat parties had 21 seats, with 10 Labour and 3 independent councillors making up the council. 19 seats were being contested with the Conservatives and Liberal Democrats defending 7 each, Labour 4 and an independent 1 seat. A total of 80 candidates were standing in the election with both the Conservative and Labour parties having a full 19 candidates. The Liberal Democrats had 18 candidates, the United Kingdom Independence Party 17, Green Party 5, British National Party 1 and 1 independent candidate.

== Election result ==
Overall turnout in the election was 39.33%.

Maidstone local election result 2004
Party	Seats	Gains	Losses	Net gain/loss	Seats %	Votes %	Votes	+/−
Conservative	9	3	1	+2	47.4	40.1	14,067	-2.1%
Liberal Democrats	6	1	2	-1	31.6	31.5	11,049	-2.8%
Labour	3	0	1	-1	15.8	13.5	4,753	-2.8%
Independent	1	0	0	0	5.3	2.0	710	-2.3%
UKIP	0	0	0	0	0	10.9	3,823	+8.0%
Green	0	0	0	0	0	1.5	529	+1.5%
BNP	0	0	0	0	0	0.5	163	+0.5%

== Ward results ==
Allington
Party	Candidate	Votes	%	±%
Liberal Democrats	Malcolm Robertson	1,317	52.5	−9.0
Conservative	James Taghdissian	617	24.6	+0.5
UKIP	Gareth Kendall	326	13.0	+9.0
Labour	Marianna Poliszczuk	250	10.0	−0.4
Majority		700	27.9	−9.4
Turnout		2,510	44.4	+10.9
Liberal Democrats hold		Swing		

Barming
Party	Candidate	Votes	%	±%
Conservative	Paul Oldham	877	84.7	−4.8
Liberal Democrats	Shona Stevens	95	9.2	−1.3
Labour	Patrick Coates	64	6.2	+6.2
Majority		782	75.5	−3.5
Turnout		1,036	53.9	+5.9
Conservative hold		Swing		

Bearsted
Party	Candidate	Votes	%	±%
Conservative	Richard Ash	1,733	60.6	−1.6
Liberal Democrats	Shella Chittenden	473	16.5	−0.7
UKIP	Frank Gandy	351	12.3	+7.4
Labour	Anthony Hull	302	10.6	−5.1
Majority		1,260	44.1	−0.9
Turnout		2,859	44.5	+12.0
Conservative hold		Swing		

Boughton Monchelsea and Chart Sutton
Party	Candidate	Votes	%	±%
Independent	Michael Fitzgerald	710	70.1	+1.4
Conservative	Theresa Stirk	261	25.8	−5.5
Labour	Edith Davis	42	4.1	+4.1
Majority		449	44.3	+6.9
Turnout		1,013	50.0	+5.0
Independent hold		Swing		

Boxley
Party	Candidate	Votes	%	±%
Conservative	Wendy Hinder	1,105	45.2	−0.9
Liberal Democrats	Ian Chittenden	781	32.0	−6.9
UKIP	Yvonne Whitehead	199	8.1	+3.4
Labour	Simon Wady	195	8.0	−2.4
BNP	William Hitches	163	6.7	+6.7
Majority		324	13.3	+6.0
Turnout		2,443	38.3	+12.6
Conservative hold		Swing		

Bridge
Party	Candidate	Votes	%	±%
Liberal Democrats	Michael Tucker	655	40.8	
Conservative	Derek Nicholson	605	37.7	
Labour	Marion Saumtally	201	12.5	
UKIP	Robert Thompson	143	8.9	
Majority		50	3.1	
Turnout		1,604	41.4	+12.9
Liberal Democrats gain from Conservative		Swing		

Coxheath and Hunton
Party	Candidate	Votes	%	±%
Conservative	Adrian Brindle	982	40.4	−0.6
Liberal Democrats	Moria Walter	976	40.1	−8.6
UKIP	Duncan Spencer	241	9.9	+9.9
Labour	Ernest Small	232	9.5	−0.7
Majority		6	0.3	
Turnout		2,431	45.2	+9.6
Conservative gain from Liberal Democrats		Swing		

East
Party	Candidate	Votes	%	±%
Liberal Democrats	Patrick Sellar	1,167	47.6	−6.6
Conservative	Alan Warner	724	29.5	−2.0
UKIP	Anthony Robertson	249	10.2	+6.8
Labour	Ann Hall	226	9.2	−1.7
Green	James Shalice	87	3.5	+3.5
Majority		443	18.1	−4.7
Turnout		2,453	39.7	+7.9
Liberal Democrats hold		Swing		

Fant
Party	Candidate	Votes	%	±%
Labour	Merello D'Souza	693	33.5	−2.2
Liberal Democrats	Stephen Beerling	619	29.9	−13.7
Conservative	Margaret Leggat	437	21.1	+4.6
UKIP	Stephen Dean	197	9.5	+5.4
Green	Ian McDonald	121	5.9	+5.9
Majority		74	3.6	
Turnout		2,067	37.3	+8.3
Labour hold		Swing		

Headcorn
Party	Candidate	Votes	%	±%
Conservative	Ian Thick	1,153	63.6	
Liberal Democrats	Juliet Maddocks	206	11.4	
UKIP	Pamela O'Brien	181	10.0	
Green	Penelope Kemp	146	8.1	
Labour	Elizabeth Stevens	126	7.0	
Majority		947	52.2	
Turnout		1,812	47.3	+8.8
Conservative hold		Swing		

Heath
Party	Candidate	Votes	%	±%
Liberal Democrats	Peter Hooper	671	53.2	
Conservative	Scott Hahnefeld	358	28.4	
Labour	Brian Wood	142	11.3	
UKIP	Antony Whitehead	91	7.2	
Majority		313	24.8	
Turnout		1,262	35.4	+9.1
Liberal Democrats hold		Swing		

High Street
Party	Candidate	Votes	%	±%
Liberal Democrats	Denise Joy	734	41.7	−6.1
Conservative	Paul Butcher	469	26.7	+2.1
Labour	Leonard Burfield	282	16.0	−3.6
UKIP	Terence Kendall	274	15.6	+7.6
Majority		265	15.1	−8.1
Turnout		1,759	30.5	+8.5
Liberal Democrats hold		Swing		

Marden and Yalding
Party	Candidate	Votes	%	±%
Conservative	Paddy Germain	1,154	49.6	−12.7
Liberal Democrats	Carol Jacques	672	28.9	+10.6
UKIP	Lisa Evans	275	11.8	+7.0
Labour	John Hughes	226	9.7	−4.8
Majority		482	20.7	−23.3
Turnout		2,327	39.7	+10.1
Conservative hold		Swing		

North
Party	Candidate	Votes	%	±%
Liberal Democrats	Jennifer Paterson	997	51.2	−7.2
Conservative	Carolyn Warner	486	25.0	−1.1
UKIP	Margaret Kendall	214	11.0	+6.5
Labour	Keith Adkinson	169	8.7	−2.4
Green	Jennifer Reid	80	4.1	+4.1
Majority		511	26.3	−6.0
Turnout		1,946	36.8	+9.0
Liberal Democrats hold		Swing		

North Downs
Party	Candidate	Votes	%	±%
Conservative	Daphne Parvin	516	59.5	−4.3
UKIP	Michael Bedwell	134	15.5	+15.5
Liberal Democrats	Jeanne Harwood	132	15.2	−9.1
Labour	Michael Casserley	85	9.8	−2.1
Majority		382	44.1	+4.7
Turnout		867	45.5	+8.5
Conservative hold		Swing		

Park Wood
Party	Candidate	Votes	%	±%
Labour	James Cook	271	30.4	
Conservative	Timothy Crockford	242	27.2	
Liberal Democrats	Robert Field	214	24.0	
UKIP	Stanley Dale	164	18.4	
Majority		29	3.2	
Turnout		891	28.2	+7.3
Labour hold		Swing		

Shepway North
Party	Candidate	Votes	%	±%
Conservative	Christopher Garland	881	42.1	−0.3
Labour	Julie Skinner	617	29.5	−11.2
UKIP	Michael George	266	12.7	+8.6
Liberal Democrats	Geoffry Samme	234	11.2	−1.6
Green	Stephen Muggeridge	95	4.5	+4.5
Majority		264	12.6	+10.9
Turnout		2,093	33.6	+9.0
Conservative gain from Labour		Swing		

Shepway South
Party	Candidate	Votes	%	±%
Labour	Kenneth Stevens	453	37.3	
Conservative	Charles Worsfold	390	32.1	
UKIP	Charles Richardson	231	19.0	
Liberal Democrats	Michael Shaw	140	11.5	
Majority		63	5.2	
Turnout		1,214	28.4	+4.8
Labour hold		Swing		

South
Party	Candidate	Votes	%	±%
Conservative	Lesley Polley	1,077	43.0	+9.4
Liberal Democrats	John Wilson	966	38.5	+9.1
UKIP	Michael Oakley	287	11.4	+9.4
Labour	Richard Coates	177	7.1	+2.3
Majority		111	4.4	+1.0
Turnout		2,507	42.2	+5.6
Conservative gain from Liberal Democrats		Swing		
