= 2004 Ellesmere Port and Neston Borough Council election =

2004 Election

Results of the 2004 Ellesmere Port and Neston Borough Council election

Elections to Ellesmere Port and Neston Borough Council were held on 10 June 2004. One third of the council was up for election and the Labour Party stayed in overall control of the council.

After the election, the composition of the council was:

- Labour 29
- Conservative 12
- Liberal Democrat 2

== Results ==
Ellesmere Port and Neston local election result 2004
Party	Seats	Gains	Losses	Net gain/loss	Seats %	Votes %	Votes	+/−
Labour	8			-2	57.1			
Conservative	5			+2	35.7			
Liberal Democrats	1			0	7.1			
UKIP	0			0	0.0			
