= 2004 Cherwell District Council election =

2004 UK local government election

Results of the 2004 Cherwell District Council election

The 2004 Cherwell District Council election took place on 10 June 2004 to elect members of Cherwell District Council in Oxfordshire, England. One third of the council was up for election and the Conservative Party stayed in overall control of the council.

After the election, the composition of the council was:

- Conservative 36
- Labour 10
- Liberal Democrat 4

== Election result ==
Cherwell local election result 2004
| Party | Seats | Gains | Losses | Net gain/loss | Seats % | Votes % | Votes | +/− |
|---|---|---|---|---|---|---|---|---|
| Conservative | 14 | 2 | 0 | +2 | 87.5 | 57.1 | 14,099 | +9.4% |
| Labour | 2 | 0 | 2 | -2 | 12.5 | 24.2 | 5,982 | -1.2% |
| Liberal Democrats | 0 | 0 | 0 | 0 | 0 | 17.1 | 4,220 | -6.7% |
| National Front | 0 | 0 | 0 | 0 | 0 | 0.9 | 231 | +0.2% |
| Green | 0 | 0 | 0 | 0 | 0 | 0.6 | 152 | -0.2% |

== Ward results ==
Adderbury
| Party | Candidate | Votes | % | ±% |
|---|---|---|---|---|
| Conservative | John Harper | 637 | 61.4 | |
| Liberal Democrats | Ian Thomas | 401 | 38.6 | |
| Majority | | 236 | 22.8 | |
| Turnout | | 1,038 | | |
| Conservative hold | | Swing | | |

Banbury Easington
| Party | Candidate | Votes | % | ±% |
|---|---|---|---|---|
| Conservative | Charles Blackwell | 1,511 | 69.3 | +21.4 |
| Labour | Royston Mold | 668 | 30.7 | +12.0 |
| Majority | | 843 | 38.6 | +9.4 |
| Turnout | | 2,179 | | |
| Conservative hold | | Swing | | |

Banbury Grimsbury & Castle
| Party | Candidate | Votes | % | ±% |
|---|---|---|---|---|
| Conservative | Carole Bonner | 1,099 | 57.1 | +6.4 |
| Labour | Neil Mepham | 827 | 42.9 | −6.4 |
| Majority | | 272 | 14.2 | +12.8 |
| Turnout | | 1,926 | | |
| Conservative gain from Labour | | Swing | | |

Banbury Hardwick
| Party | Candidate | Votes | % | ±% |
|---|---|---|---|---|
| Conservative | John Donaldson | 819 | 66.1 | +5.7 |
| Labour | Martin Weir | 420 | 33.9 | −5.7 |
| Majority | | 399 | 32.2 | +11.4 |
| Turnout | | 1,239 | | |
| Conservative hold | | Swing | | |

Banbury Neithrop
| Party | Candidate | Votes | % | ±% |
|---|---|---|---|---|
| Labour | Surinder Dhesi | 656 | 55.3 | |
| Conservative | Wendy Moore | 530 | 44.7 | |
| Majority | | 126 | 10.6 | |
| Turnout | | 1,186 | | |
| Labour hold | | Swing | | |

Banbury Ruscote
| Party | Candidate | Votes | % | ±% |
|---|---|---|---|---|
| Labour | Patrick Cartledge | 883 | 53.6 | +2.7 |
| Conservative | Keith Strangwood | 763 | 46.4 | −2.7 |
| Majority | | 120 | 7.2 | +5.4 |
| Turnout | | 1,646 | | |
| Labour hold | | Swing | | |

Bicester East
| Party | Candidate | Votes | % | ±% |
|---|---|---|---|---|
| Conservative | Ajit Bhart | 755 | 55.6 | +12.8 |
| Labour | John Broad | 603 | 44.4 | −2.2 |
| Majority | | 152 | 11.2 | |
| Turnout | | 1,358 | | |
| Conservative hold | | Swing | | |

Bicester North
| Party | Candidate | Votes | % | ±% |
|---|---|---|---|---|
| Conservative | Lynn Pratt | 957 | 64.2 | +6.8 |
| Liberal Democrats | Stephen Creed | 533 | 35.8 | +20.9 |
| Majority | | 424 | 28.4 | −1.2 |
| Turnout | | 1,490 | | |
| Conservative hold | | Swing | | |

Bicester South
| Party | Candidate | Votes | % | ±% |
|---|---|---|---|---|
| Conservative | Daniel Sames | 688 | 55.0 | +12.4 |
| Liberal Democrats | Nicholas Cotter | 564 | 45.0 | +4.3 |
| Majority | | 124 | 10.0 | +8.1 |
| Turnout | | 1,252 | | |
| Conservative hold | | Swing | | |

Bicester Town
| Party | Candidate | Votes | % | ±% |
|---|---|---|---|---|
| Conservative | Deborah Pickford | 852 | 63.3 | +11.0 |
| Labour | Nicholas Cherry | 494 | 36.7 | +5.1 |
| Majority | | 358 | 26.6 | +5.9 |
| Turnout | | 1,346 | | |
| Conservative hold | | Swing | | |

Bicester West
| Party | Candidate | Votes | % | ±% |
|---|---|---|---|---|
| Conservative | Russell Hurle | 1,144 | 57.4 | +18.8 |
| Labour | Alan Hasted | 618 | 31.0 | −12.3 |
| National Front | James Starkey | 231 | 11.6 | +3.7 |
| Majority | | 526 | 26.4 | |
| Turnout | | 1,993 | | |
| Conservative hold | | Swing | | |

Bloxham & Bodicote
| Party | Candidate | Votes | % | ±% |
|---|---|---|---|---|
| Conservative | Lynda Smart | 1,310 | 63.2 | |
| Liberal Democrats | Peter Davies | 763 | 36.8 | |
| Majority | | 547 | 26.4 | |
| Turnout | | 2,073 | | |
| Conservative hold | | Swing | | |

Caversfield
| Party | Candidate | Votes | % | ±% |
|---|---|---|---|---|
| Conservative | Catherine Fulljames | 505 | 71.6 | −3.4 |
| Liberal Democrats | Andrew Murray | 200 | 28.4 | +15.1 |
| Majority | | 305 | 43.2 | −18.5 |
| Turnout | | 769 | | |
| Conservative hold | | Swing | | |

Kidlington South
| Party | Candidate | Votes | % | ±% |
|---|---|---|---|---|
| Conservative | Maurice Billington | 1,004 | 38.0 | +9.5 |
| Liberal Democrats | Devena Rae | 833 | 31.5 | −2.4 |
| Labour | Robert Laynes | 656 | 24.8 | −12.8 |
| Green | Janet Warren | 152 | 5.7 | +5.7 |
| Majority | | 171 | 6.5 | |
| Turnout | | 2,645 | | |
| Conservative gain from Labour | | Swing | | |

Launton
| Party | Candidate | Votes | % | ±% |
|---|---|---|---|---|
| Conservative | David Hughes | 740 | 78.4 | +1.4 |
| Liberal Democrats | Neil Walton | 204 | 21.6 | −1.4 |
| Majority | | 536 | 56.8 | +2.8 |
| Turnout | | 944 | | |
| Conservative hold | | Swing | | |

Yarnton, Gosford & Water Eaton
| Party | Candidate | Votes | % | ±% |
|---|---|---|---|---|
| Conservative | Maureen Hastings | 785 | 47.2 | +7.5 |
| Liberal Democrats | Brendan Morrison | 722 | 43.4 | −11.8 |
| Labour | Joyce Ruiz | 157 | 9.4 | +9.4 |
| Majority | | 63 | 3.8 | |
| Turnout | | 1,664 | | |
| Conservative hold | | Swing | | |
