= 2004 Waveney District Council election =

2004 UK local government election

Map of the results

The 2004 Waveney Council election took place on 10 June 2004 to elect members of Waveney District Council in Suffolk, England. One third of the council was up for election and the council stayed under no overall control.

== Election result ==
2004 Waveney District Council election
Party	This election			Full council			This election		
Party	Seats	Net	Seats %	Other	Total	Total %	Votes	Votes %	+/−
Conservative	10	▲2	58.8	14	24	50.0	10,761	38.0	+0.6
Labour	4	▼3	23.5	12	16	33.3	8,081	28.5	-2.8
Independent	2	▲1	11.8	3	5	10.4	1,896	6.7	+0.2
Liberal Democrats	1	Steady	5.9	2	3	6.3	3,816	13.5	-2.8
Green	0	Steady	0.0	0	0	0.0	2,945	10.4	+3.5
UKIP	0	Steady	0.0	0	0	0.0	820	2.9	+1.6

== Ward results ==
Beccles North
Party	Candidate	Votes	%	±%
Conservative	Christopher Punt	728	42.3	+8.6
Labour	Alan Thwaites	483	28.0	−1.2
Green	Graham Elliott	274	15.9	+4.4
Liberal Democrats	Frances Mitchell	237	13.8	+4.3
Majority		245	14.2	+9.7
Turnout		1,722	44.7	+3.5
Conservative hold		Swing		

Beccles South
Party	Candidate	Votes	%	±%
Labour	Jack Walmsley	447	32.9	−7.6
Conservative	Barry Bee	376	27.7	−8.7
UKIP	Brian Aylett	355	26.2	+26.2
Liberal Democrats	Alison Briggs	115	8.5	−8.7
Green	Nicola Elliott	64	4.7	−1.2
Majority		71	5.2	+1.2
Turnout		1,357	35.1	+11.5
Labour hold		Swing		

Bungay
Party	Candidate	Votes	%	±%
Conservative	Simon Woods	604	39.3	−9.3
Labour	David Jermy	500	32.5	+3.3
Liberal Democrats	Wendy Curry	232	15.1	+3.0
Green	Simon Thompson	201	13.1	+3.1
Majority		104	6.8	−12.6
Turnout		1,537	39.6	+2.3
Conservative gain from Labour		Swing		

Carlton
Party	Candidate	Votes	%	±%
Conservative	Stephen Ardley	598	52.7	−5.4
Labour	Angela Turner	260	22.9	−0.2
Liberal Democrats	Brian Howe	176	15.5	+0.1
Green	Liam Carroll	101	8.9	+5.4
Majority		338	29.8	−5.2
Turnout		1,135	31.8	+7.8
Conservative hold		Swing		

Carlton Colville
Party	Candidate	Votes	%	±%
Conservative	Stephen Sayer	636	39.3	−11.1
UKIP	Bertie Poole	465	28.7	+28.7
Labour	Alan Brown	414	25.6	−5.4
Green	Richard Vinton	105	6.5	+1.9
Majority		171	10.6	−8.9
Turnout		1,620	29.6	+7.8
Conservative hold		Swing		

Gunton and Corton
Party	Candidate	Votes	%	±%
Conservative	Mary Rudd	1,004	57.7	
Labour	Tracey Smith	309	17.8	
Liberal Democrats	Patricia Anderson	261	15.0	
Green	Maxine Narburgh	165	9.5	
Majority		695	39.9	
Turnout		1,739	45.4	+1.8
Conservative hold		Swing		

Halesworth
Party	Candidate	Votes	%	±%
Conservative	Patricia Flegg	997	57.1	+7.5
Labour	Paul Widdowson	386	22.1	+2.2
Green	Paul Whitlow	363	20.8	+1.2
Majority		611	35.0	+5.2
Turnout		1,746	44.8	+9.0
Conservative hold		Swing		

Harbour
Party	Candidate	Votes	%	±%
Independent	Patricia Hawes	676	40.3	+1.9
Labour	Ian Graham	446	26.6	−0.9
Conservative	Gerald Mitzman	227	13.5	+3.5
Liberal Democrats	Andrew Thomas	185	11.0	−9.3
Green	Lucille Mason	143	8.5	+4.8
Majority		230	13.7	+2.8
Turnout		1,677	30.0	+3.2
Independent hold		Swing		

Kessingland
Party	Candidate	Votes	%	±%
Conservative	David Provan	622	39.8	
Labour	Kate McGee	501	32.1	
Liberal Democrats	Nicholas Bromley	285	18.2	
Green	Emma Waller	154	9.9	
Majority		121	7.7	
Turnout		1,562	40.7	+4.3
Conservative gain from Labour		Swing		

Kirkley
Party	Candidate	Votes	%	±%
Liberal Democrats	David Young	807	45.7	−5.5
Labour	Bharat Patel	568	32.2	+2.2
Conservative	Neil Littler	257	14.6	+1.8
Green	Melanie Harrison	132	7.5	+1.6
Majority		239	13.5	−7.7
Turnout		1,764	32.7	+7.2
Liberal Democrats hold		Swing		

Normanston
Party	Candidate	Votes	%	±%
Labour	Keith Patience	645	40.6	+1.2
Conservative	Dorothy Blenkinsopp	474	29.8	−4.3
Liberal Democrats	Jack Thain	305	19.2	+3.2
Green	Stephen Sizer	164	10.3	+4.8
Majority		171	10.8	+5.6
Turnout		1,588	30.2	+8.4
Labour hold		Swing		

Oulton Broad
Party	Candidate	Votes	%	±%
Conservative	Sandra Keller	641	44.7	
Labour	Allyson Barron	393	27.4	
Liberal Democrats	Antony Tibbitt	248	17.3	
Green	Kerry Taylor	151	10.5	
Majority		248	17.3	
Turnout		1,433	37.3	+2.1
Conservative hold		Swing		

Pakefield
Party	Candidate	Votes	%	±%
Conservative	Stuart Foulger	769	36.6	+5.4
Labour	Malcolm Pitchers	739	35.2	−8.2
Liberal Democrats	Lorraine Lakes	351	16.7	−3.4
Green	Ann Skipper	243	11.6	+6.3
Majority		30	1.4	
Turnout		2,102	38.6	+5.8
Conservative gain from Labour		Swing		

Southwold and Reydon
Party	Candidate	Votes	%	±%
Independent	Susan Allen	718	41.8	
Conservative	Peter Austin	644	37.5	
Green	John Windell	198	11.5	
Labour	Lynn Derges	158	9.2	
Majority		74	4.3	
Turnout		1,718	53.5	+0.4
Independent gain from Conservative		Swing		

St. Margarets
Party	Candidate	Votes	%	±%
Labour	Jonathan Winterton	675	34.9	−8.6
Conservative	John Burford	624	32.3	−5.2
Independent	George Hawes	502	26.0	+26.0
Green	Colin Boor	133	6.9	+2.0
Majority		51	2.6	−3.4
Turnout		1,934	33.1	+8.1
Labour hold		Swing		

Whitton
Party	Candidate	Votes	%	±%
Labour	Sally Spore	810	39.0	−1.8
Conservative	Mary Reader	706	34.0	+7.7
Liberal Democrats	Sandra Tonge	346	16.7	+3.6
Green	Jennifer Berry	213	10.3	+6.7
Majority		104	5.0	−9.6
Turnout		2,075	35.6	+8.1
Labour hold		Swing		

Worlingham
Party	Candidate	Votes	%	±%
Conservative	Alan Duce	854	53.0	−3.7
Labour	William Mason	347	21.5	−1.3
Liberal Democrats	Philip Mitchell	268	16.6	+0.8
Green	Susan Boor	141	8.8	+4.1
Majority		507	31.5	−2.4
Turnout		1,610	44.3	+7.8
Conservative hold		Swing		
