= 2004 Tamworth Borough Council election =

2004 UK local government election

Results of the 2004 Tamworth Borough Council election

Elections to Tamworth Borough Council were held on 10 June 2004. One third of the council was up for election and the Conservative Party gained overall control of the council from the Labour Party. Overall turnout was 31.4%

After the election, the composition of the council was:

- Conservative 16
- Labour 13
- Independent 1

== Election result ==
Tamworth local election result 2004
| Party | Seats | Gains | Losses | Net gain/loss | Seats % | Votes % | Votes | +/− |
|---|---|---|---|---|---|---|---|---|
| Conservative | 8 | 5 | 0 | +5 | 80.0 | 43.0 | 7,581 | +0.2% |
| Labour | 2 | 0 | 5 | -5 | 20.0 | 37.3 | 6,571 | -4.7% |
| Liberal Democrats | 0 | 0 | 0 | 0 | 0 | 11.3 | 1,998 | +2.0% |
| Independent | 0 | 0 | 0 | 0 | 0 | 8.4 | 1,487 | +2.5% |

== Ward results ==
Amington
| Party | Candidate | Votes | % | ±% |
|---|---|---|---|---|
| Conservative | Evelyn Rowe | 881 | 47.4 | +2.7 |
| Labour | Gordon Owen | 623 | 33.5 | −7.0 |
| Liberal Democrats | Simon Walton | 355 | 19.1 | +4.3 |
| Majority | | 258 | 13.9 | +9.7 |
| Turnout | | 1,859 | 30.7 | +6.9 |
| Conservative hold | | Swing | | |

Belgrave
| Party | Candidate | Votes | % | ±% |
|---|---|---|---|---|
| Conservative | Robert Pritchard | 575 | 36.8 | +0.9 |
| Labour | Brian Granger | 544 | 34.8 | −10.1 |
| Independent | Robert Taylor | 443 | 28.4 | +9.2 |
| Majority | | 31 | 2.0 | |
| Turnout | | 1,562 | 28.5 | +9.6 |
| Conservative gain from Labour | | Swing | | |

Bolehall
| Party | Candidate | Votes | % | ±% |
|---|---|---|---|---|
| Labour | John Faulkner | 925 | 56.5 | +0.5 |
| Conservative | Geoffrey Parsons | 711 | 43.5 | −0.5 |
| Majority | | 214 | 13.0 | +1.0 |
| Turnout | | 1,636 | 31.1 | +7.4 |
| Labour hold | | Swing | | |

Castle
| Party | Candidate | Votes | % | ±% |
|---|---|---|---|---|
| Conservative | Alan Lees | 801 | 43.4 | +5.1 |
| Labour | Pamela Faulkner | 661 | 35.8 | −9.7 |
| Liberal Democrats | Jennifer Pinkett | 382 | 20.7 | +4.6 |
| Majority | | 140 | 7.6 | |
| Turnout | | 1,844 | 33.2 | +7.7 |
| Conservative gain from Labour | | Swing | | |

Glascote
| Party | Candidate | Votes | % | ±% |
|---|---|---|---|---|
| Labour | Dennis Powick | 593 | 38.8 | +6.1 |
| Independent | Mark Green | 568 | 37.1 | −13.8 |
| Conservative | Diana Wells | 369 | 24.1 | +7.7 |
| Majority | | 25 | 1.7 | |
| Turnout | | 1,530 | 26.6 | +6.9 |
| Labour hold | | Swing | | |

Mercian
| Party | Candidate | Votes | % | ±% |
|---|---|---|---|---|
| Conservative | Samuel Munn | 832 | 42.1 | +2.5 |
| Labour | John Garforth | 707 | 35.8 | −5.4 |
| Liberal Democrats | Geoffrey Blake | 435 | 22.0 | +2.8 |
| Majority | | 125 | 6.3 | |
| Turnout | | 1,974 | 37.2 | +8.3 |
| Conservative gain from Labour | | Swing | | |

Spital
| Party | Candidate | Votes | % | ±% |
|---|---|---|---|---|
| Conservative | Ronald Cook | 1,063 | 51.2 | −1.5 |
| Labour | Karen Hirons | 621 | 29.9 | −2.8 |
| Liberal Democrats | Jennifer Blake | 394 | 19.0 | +4.3 |
| Majority | | 412 | 21.3 | +1.3 |
| Turnout | | 2,078 | 39.6 | +7.1 |
| Conservative hold | | Swing | | |

Stonydelph
| Party | Candidate | Votes | % | ±% |
|---|---|---|---|---|
| Conservative | Daniel Cook | 517 | 35.8 | −16.3 |
| Independent | Jacqueline Butcher | 476 | 33.0 | +33.0 |
| Labour | David Foster | 451 | 31.2 | −16.7 |
| Majority | | 41 | 2.8 | −11.7 |
| Turnout | | 1,444 | 24.8 | +10.3 |
| Conservative gain from Labour | | Swing | | |

Trinity
| Party | Candidate | Votes | % | ±% |
|---|---|---|---|---|
| Conservative | Gerald Pinner | 937 | 48.7 | −0.3 |
| Labour | Michelle Abbots | 557 | 28.9 | −7.3 |
| Liberal Democrats | Roger Jones | 432 | 22.4 | +7.6 |
| Majority | | 380 | 19.8 | +7.0 |
| Turnout | | 1,926 | 33.1 | +6.5 |
| Conservative hold | | Swing | | |

Wilnecote
| Party | Candidate | Votes | % | ±% |
|---|---|---|---|---|
| Conservative | Mary Oates | 895 | 50.2 | −1.0 |
| Labour | Joan Jenkins | 889 | 49.8 | +1.0 |
| Majority | | 6 | 0.4 | −2.0 |
| Turnout | | 1,784 | 30.3 | +10.1 |
| Conservative gain from Labour | | Swing | | |
