= 2004 Purbeck District Council election =

2004 UK local government election

Results of the 2004 Purbeck District Council election

Elections to Purbeck District Council were held on 10 June 2004. One third of the council was up for election and the Conservative Party stayed in overall control of the council.

After the election, the composition of the council was

- Conservative 13
- Liberal Democrat 8
- Independent 3

== Election result ==
Purbeck local election result 2004
Party	Seats	Gains	Losses	Net gain/loss	Seats %	Votes %	Votes	+/−
Conservative	6			0	75.0	49.2	5,934	+4.9%
Liberal Democrats	2			0	25.0	37.0	4,459	+0.6%
Labour	0			0	0	9.3	1,118	-3.5%
UKIP	0			0	0	4.5	541	+4.5%

== Ward results ==
Lytchett Matravers
Party	Candidate	Votes	%	±%
Conservative	John Hyde	781	56.6	+56.6
Liberal Democrats	Michael Peacock	598	43.4	−3.5
Majority		183	13.2	
Turnout		1,379		

Lytchett Minster and Upton East
Party	Candidate	Votes	%	±%
Liberal Democrats	Wendy Starr	570	52.2	−9.3
Conservative	Pamela Hindley	523	47.8	+9.3
Majority		47	4.4	−18.6
Turnout		1,093		

Lytchett Minster and Upton West
Party	Candidate	Votes	%	±%
Conservative	Paul Johns	848	59.1	+15.1
Liberal Democrats	Angela Jones	502	35.0	−10.6
Labour	David Collis	86	6.0	−4.4
Majority		346	24.1	
Turnout		1,436		

St Martin
Party	Candidate	Votes	%	±%
Liberal Democrats	Beryl Ezzard	523	50.8	−3.5
Conservative	Malcolm Russell	432	41.9	+10.6
Labour	James Selby Bennett	75	7.3	−7.1
Majority		91	8.9	−14.1
Turnout		1,030		

Swanage North
Party	Candidate	Votes	%	±%
Conservative	Antony Miller	904	55.2	−5.5
Liberal Democrats	Michael Hadley	549	33.5	+6.1
Labour	Christine Rabson	184	11.2	−0.7
Majority		355	21.7	−11.6
Turnout		1,637		

Swanage South
Party	Candidate	Votes	%	±%
Conservative	Colin Bright	727	35.6	−14.7
Labour	Cherry Bartlett	614	30.0	+7.4
Liberal Democrats	David Scull	455	22.3	−4.9
UKIP	Ken Harvey	248	12.1	+12.1
Majority		113	5.6	−17.5
Turnout		2,044		

Wareham
Party	Candidate	Votes	%	±%
Conservative	Roy Anderson	1,132	50.9	+24.0
Liberal Democrats	Keith Critchley	1,093	49.1	+15.5
Majority		39	1.8	
Turnout		2,225		

Wool
Party	Candidate	Votes	%	±%
Conservative	Malcolm Shakesby	587	48.6	−21.4
UKIP	John Barnes	293	24.3	+24.3
Liberal Democrats	Judith Webb	169	14.0	+14.0
Labour	Jon Davey	159	13.2	−16.8
Majority		294	24.3	−15.7
Turnout		1,208		
