= 2011 United Kingdom elections =

The 2011 United Kingdom elections may refer to one of six elections in the United Kingdom that took place on 5 May 2011:

- 2011 United Kingdom local elections
- 2011 Scottish Parliament election
- 2011 National Assembly for Wales election
- 2011 Northern Ireland Assembly election
- 2011 Leicester South by-election
- 2011 United Kingdom Alternative Vote referendum
