= Law of the Tropics =

1941 film by Ray Enright

- Directed by: Ray Enright
- Written by: George Beatty
- Screenplay by: Charles Grayson; M. Coates Webster; Barry Trivers
- Based on: Oil for the Lamps of China by Alice Tisdale Hobart
- Produced by: Bryan Foy; Benjamin Stoloff
- Starring: Constance Bennett; Jeffrey Lynn; Regis Toomey; Mona Maris
- Cinematography: Sidney Hickox
- Edited by: Frederick Richards
- Music by: Howard Jackson
- Production company: Warner Bros. Pictures
- Distributed by: Warner Bros. Pictures
- Release date: October 4, 1941
- Running time: 76 minutes
- Country: United States
- Language: English

Law of the Tropics is a 1941 American drama film directed by Ray Enright and starring Constance Bennett, Jeffrey Lynn and Regis Toomey. By the time Bennett made the film, her career was in steep decline. It was produced and distributed by Warner Bros. Pictures.

The film is loosely based on the 1935 movie Oil for the Lamps of China, but the setting is changed from China to the Amazon jungle, and the tone is somewhat lighter. The conflict between a man's conscience and his corporate loyalty, which is a principal theme of the original, is less important in this film.

== Synopsis ==
Jim Conway, working on a South American rubber plantation, goes to the port to meet his fiancée who he is expecting to come out to him. Instead he received a telegram from her telling him she has married another man. Disconsolate he heads to a waterfront dive where he encounters singer Joan Madison. He offers to take her to live with him on his plantation, something attractive to her as she is on the run from the law.

== Cast ==
- Constance Bennett as Joan Madison
- Jeffrey Lynn as Jim Conway
- Regis Toomey as Tom Marshall
- Mona Maris as Rita Marshall
- Hobart Bosworth as Boss Frank Davis
- Frank Puglia as Tito
- Thomas E. Jackson as Det. Maguire
- Paul Harvey as Alfred King Sr.
- Craig Stevens as Alfred King Jr.
- Charles Judels as Cap
- Roland Drew as Hotel Clerk
- Cliff Clark as Bartender
- Rolfe Sedan as Julio André
- Emory Parnell as Bartender

== Bibliography ==
- Fetrow, Alan G. Feature Films, 1940-1949: a United States Filmography. McFarland, 1994.
