= 2004 United States presidential election in California =

- November 2, 2004
- Turnout: 76.04% (of registered voters) ▲5.10 pp 57.03% (of eligible voters) ▲5.11 pp

Nominee	John Kerry	George W. Bush
Party	Democratic	Republican
Home state	Massachusetts	Texas
Running mate	John Edwards	Dick Cheney
Electoral vote	55	0
Popular vote	6,745,485	5,509,826
Percentage	54.31%	44.36%

Kerry
40–50%
50–60%
60–70%
70–80%
80–90%
Bush
40–50%
50–60%
60–70%
70–80%
President before election
George W. Bush
Republican
Elected President
George W. Bush
Republican

The 2004 United States presidential election in California took place on November 2 as part of the 2004 United States presidential election. Voters chose 55 representatives, or electors to the Electoral College, who voted for president and vice president.

California was won by Democratic nominee John Kerry by a 9.95% margin of victory. Prior to the election, all leading news organizations considered this a state Kerry would win, or otherwise considered as a safe blue state. Republican presidential candidates have not taken California's electoral votes since Bush's father George H. W. Bush in his victory over Michael Dukakis in 1988. Bush would become the first Republican to win two terms in the White House without winning California at least once. With its 55 electoral votes, California was John Kerry's biggest electoral prize in 2004.

This marked the first election since 1880 in which the Republican nominee won the nationwide popular vote without California and the first time since 1976 that it voted for the popular vote loser. It was also the first time since Californian statehood in 1850 that a presidential candidate, of any party, was elected to two terms to the presidency without winning the state either time.

This is the most recent election in which a Republican presidential candidate has received more than 40% of the vote in California. It is also the most recent time a Republican has won more than a third of the vote in Los Angeles County, and the latest time the gap between the Republican and Democratic candidates was less than two million votes and a single-digit margin.

== Primaries ==
- 2004 California Democratic presidential primary
- 2004 California Republican presidential primary

== Campaign ==
=== Predictions ===
There were 12 news organizations who made state-by-state predictions of the election. Here are their last predictions before election day.

Source	Ranking
D.C. Political Report	Solid D
Associated Press	Solid D
CNN	Likely D
Cook Political Report	Solid D
Newsweek	Solid D
New York Times	Solid D
Rasmussen Reports	Likely D
Research 2000	Solid D
Washington Post	Likely D
Washington Times	Solid D
Zogby International	Likely D
Washington Dispatch	Likely D

=== Polling ===
Kerry led every single pre-election poll. The final 3 polls average Kerry leading at 52% to Bush at 43% to Nader at 2%.

=== Fundraising ===
Bush raised $20,296,645, the second most money raised state for him. It accounted for 10.7% of all the money he raised in 2004. Kerry raised $36,378,063, which is by far the most money raised for Kerry by any state. The money raised in California accounted for almost 20% of all money he raised in 2004.

=== Advertising and visits ===
Neither Kerry nor Bush advertised or campaigned in the state during the fall election.

== Analysis ==
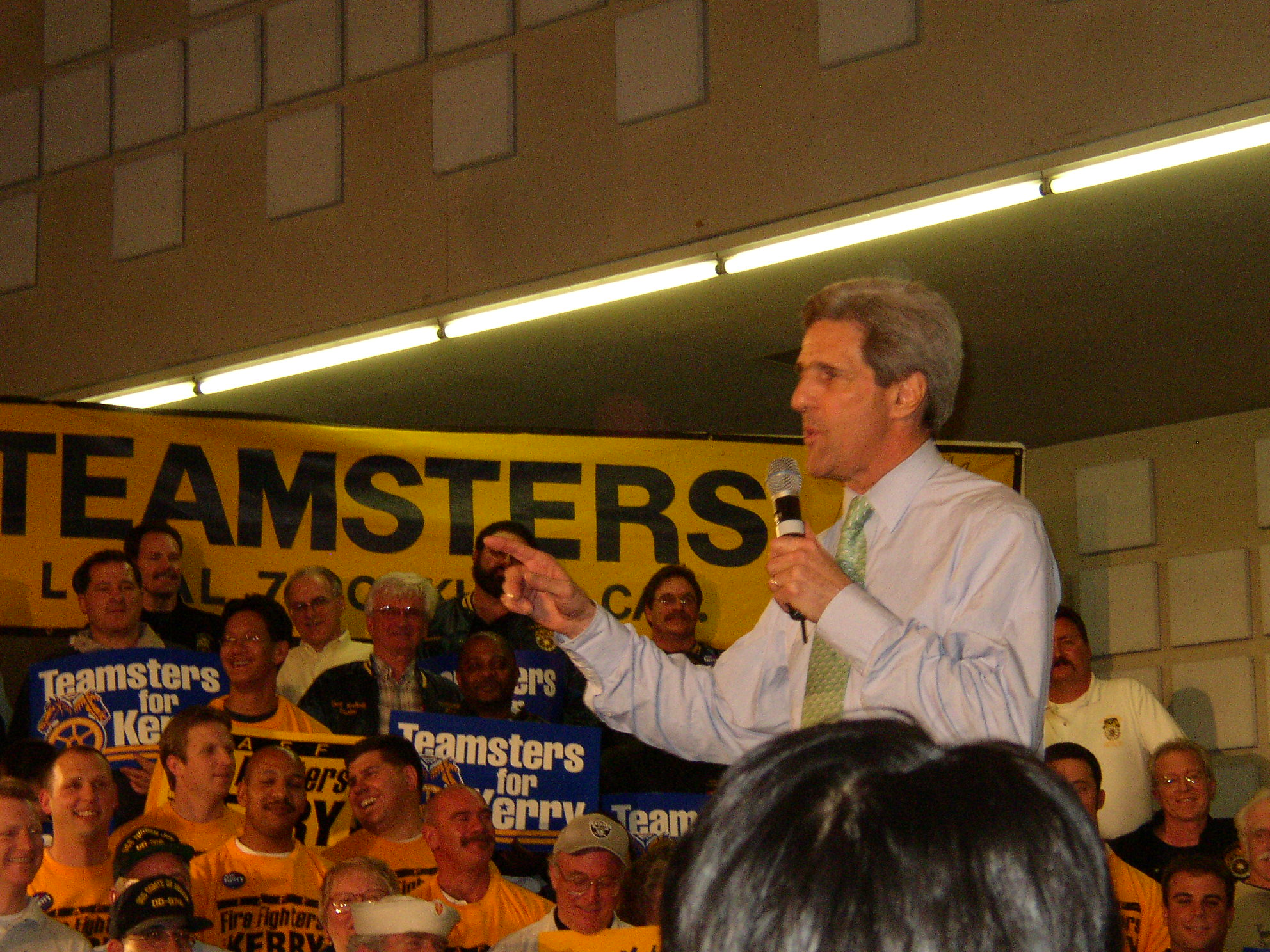
John Kerry at rally for the Teamsters in Oakland, 2004

California was once a Republican-leaning swing state, supporting Republican candidates in every election from 1952 through 1988, except in 1964. However, since the 1990s, California has become a reliably Democratic state with a highly diverse ethnic population (mostly Latino) and liberal bastions such as the San Francisco Bay Area and Los Angeles County. The last time a Republican candidate won the state was in 1988 by George H. W. Bush.

In 2004, the state did swing slightly Republican by a 1.9% margin from 2000 due to strong swings in heavily populated San Diego, Orange, Riverside, San Bernardino, Ventura, Kern, Fresno, Stanislaus, and San Joaquin counties, in all of which Bush increased his margin by substantially more than he did nationally, and all of which save San Diego, San Joaquin, and Ventura he won by double digits. Bush also won over a million votes in Los Angeles County, the most populous county in the United States; and he held Kerry to a 0.2% margin in Sacramento County (which Gore had won by 4.0%). Bush also benefited from strong support by Arnold Schwarzenegger, the state's Republican governor. These factors likely contributed to California being closer than expected in 2004.

Bush remains the last Republican candidate to win San Diego, San Luis Obispo and Ventura counties in a presidential election. Fresno, Merced, Riverside, San Bernardino, San Joaquin, and Stanislaus counties would not vote Republican again until 2024. He is also the last candidate of any party to win Butte County by a majority. This is the last time the Democratic Party failed to obtain at least 60% of the vote until 2024. Alpine County voted Democratic for the first time since 1936 and Mono County for the first time since 1940.

Bush won whites 51%-47%, while Kerry won African-Americans 81%-18%, Latinos 63%-32%, and Asians 66%-34%.

== Results ==
2004 United States presidential election in California
Party	Candidate	Votes	Percentage	Electoral votes
Democratic	John Forbes Kerry and John Reid Edwards	6,745,485	54.31%	55
Republican	George Walker Bush and Richard Bruce Cheney (incumbent)	5,509,826	44.36%	0
Libertarian	Michael Badnarik	50,165	0.40%	0
Green	David Cobb	40,771	0.33%	0
Peace and Freedom	Leonard Peltier	27,607	0.22%	0
American Independent	Michael Peroutka	26,645	0.21%	0
Independent	Ralph Nader (write-in)	20,714	0.17%	0
Independent	John Joseph Kennedy (write-in)	82	0.00%	0
Independent	John Parker (write-in)	49	0.00%	0
Independent	James Alexander-Pace (write-in)	8	0.00%	0
Independent	Anthony Jabin (write-in)	1	0.00%	0
Totals		12,421,353	100.00%	55
Voter turnout (Voting Age voters)				74.7%

=== By county ===
County	John Kerry Democratic		George W. Bush Republican		Various candidates Other parties		Margin		Total votes cast
County	#	%	#	%	#	%	#	%	Total votes cast
Alameda	422,585	75.18%	130,911	23.29%	8,594	1.53%	291,674	51.89%	562,090
Alpine	373	53.21%	311	44.37%	17	2.43%	62	8.84%	701
Amador	6,541	36.56%	11,107	62.08%	243	1.36%	-4,566	-25.52%	17,891
Butte	42,448	44.14%	51,662	53.73%	2,047	2.13%	-9,214	-9.58%	96,157
Calaveras	8,286	37.09%	13,601	60.87%	456	2.04%	-5,315	-23.79%	22,343
Colusa	1,947	31.58%	4,142	67.17%	77	1.25%	-2,195	-35.60%	6,166
Contra Costa	257,254	62.28%	150,608	36.46%	5,166	1.25%	106,646	25.82%	413,028
Del Norte	3,892	41.31%	5,356	56.85%	173	1.84%	-1,464	-15.54%	9,421
El Dorado	32,242	37.33%	52,878	61.23%	1,244	1.44%	-20,636	-23.89%	86,364
Fresno	103,154	41.68%	141,988	57.38%	2,321	0.94%	-38,834	-15.69%	247,463
Glenn	2,995	31.68%	6,308	66.72%	151	1.60%	-3,313	-35.04%	9,454
Humboldt	37,988	57.66%	25,714	39.03%	2,184	3.31%	12,274	18.63%	65,886
Imperial	17,964	52.41%	15,890	46.36%	420	1.23%	2,074	6.05%	34,274
Inyo	3,350	38.88%	5,091	59.09%	175	2.03%	-1,741	-20.21%	8,616
Kern	68,603	32.49%	140,417	66.49%	2,154	1.02%	-71,814	-34.01%	211,174
Kings	10,833	33.74%	21,003	65.41%	274	0.85%	-10,170	-31.67%	32,110
Lake	13,141	53.16%	11,093	44.88%	485	1.96%	2,048	8.29%	24,719
Lassen	3,158	27.58%	8,126	70.97%	166	1.45%	-4,968	-43.39%	11,450
Los Angeles	1,907,736	63.10%	1,076,225	35.60%	39,319	1.30%	831,511	27.50%	3,023,280
Madera	13,481	34.70%	24,871	64.02%	498	1.28%	-11,390	-29.32%	38,850
Marin	99,070	73.21%	34,378	25.40%	1,877	1.39%	64,692	47.80%	135,325
Mariposa	3,251	37.55%	5,215	60.23%	192	2.22%	-1,964	-22.68%	8,658
Mendocino	24,385	63.45%	12,955	33.71%	1,089	2.83%	11,430	29.74%	38,429
Merced	24,491	42.26%	32,773	56.54%	696	1.20%	-8,282	-14.29%	57,960
Modoc	1,149	25.72%	3,235	72.42%	83	1.86%	-2,086	-46.70%	4,467
Mono	2,628	49.23%	2,621	49.10%	89	1.67%	7	0.13%	5,338
Monterey	75,241	60.36%	47,838	38.38%	1,574	1.26%	27,403	21.98%	124,653
Napa	33,666	59.48%	22,059	38.97%	874	1.54%	11,607	20.51%	56,599
Nevada	24,220	44.92%	28,790	53.39%	910	1.69%	-4,570	-8.48%	53,920
Orange	419,239	38.98%	641,832	59.68%	14,328	1.33%	-222,593	-20.70%	1,075,399
Placer	55,573	36.26%	95,969	62.61%	1,736	1.13%	-40,396	-26.35%	153,278
Plumas	4,129	36.90%	6,905	61.71%	156	1.39%	-2,776	-24.81%	11,190
Riverside	228,806	41.04%	322,473	57.83%	6,300	1.13%	-93,667	-16.80%	557,579
Sacramento	236,657	49.52%	235,539	49.29%	5,670	1.19%	1,118	0.23%	477,866
San Benito	9,851	52.61%	8,698	46.45%	176	0.94%	1,153	6.16%	18,725
San Bernardino	227,789	43.57%	289,306	55.34%	5,682	1.09%	-61,517	-11.77%	522,777
San Diego	526,437	46.33%	596,033	52.45%	13,874	1.22%	-69,596	-6.12%	1,136,344
San Francisco	296,772	83.02%	54,355	15.21%	6,338	1.77%	242,417	67.82%	357,465
San Joaquin	87,012	45.83%	100,978	53.18%	1,874	0.99%	-13,966	-7.36%	189,864
San Luis Obispo	58,742	45.52%	67,995	52.69%	2,313	1.79%	-9,253	-7.17%	129,050
San Mateo	197,922	69.48%	83,315	29.25%	3,620	1.27%	114,607	40.23%	284,857
Santa Barbara	90,314	53.17%	76,806	45.22%	2,741	1.61%	13,508	7.95%	169,861
Santa Clara	386,100	63.94%	209,094	34.63%	8,622	1.43%	177,006	29.31%	603,816
Santa Cruz	89,102	72.98%	30,354	24.86%	2,628	2.15%	58,748	48.12%	122,084
Shasta	24,339	31.31%	52,249	67.22%	1,143	1.47%	-27,910	-35.91%	77,731
Sierra	646	33.16%	1,249	64.12%	53	2.72%	-603	-30.95%	1,948
Siskiyou	7,880	37.71%	12,673	60.64%	346	1.66%	-4,793	-22.93%	20,899
Solano	85,096	57.17%	62,301	41.86%	1,440	0.97%	22,795	15.32%	148,837
Sonoma	148,261	67.18%	68,204	30.90%	4,225	1.91%	80,057	36.28%	220,690
Stanislaus	58,829	40.40%	85,407	58.65%	1,388	0.95%	-26,578	-18.25%	145,624
Sutter	9,602	31.85%	20,254	67.19%	289	0.96%	-10,652	-35.34%	30,145
Tehama	7,504	32.01%	15,572	66.42%	368	1.57%	-8,068	-34.41%	23,444
Trinity	2,782	42.71%	3,560	54.66%	171	2.63%	-778	-11.95%	6,513
Tulare	32,494	32.87%	65,399	66.15%	967	0.98%	-32,905	-33.28%	98,860
Tuolumne	10,104	38.51%	15,745	60.02%	386	1.47%	-5,641	-21.50%	26,235
Ventura	148,859	47.53%	160,314	51.19%	4,020	1.28%	-11,455	-3.66%	313,193
Yolo	42,885	59.34%	28,005	38.75%	1,379	1.91%	14,880	20.59%	72,269
Yuba	5,687	31.55%	12,076	67.00%	261	1.45%	-6,389	-35.45%	18,024
Total	6,745,485	54.31%	5,509,826	44.36%	166,042	1.34%	1,235,659	9.95%	12,421,353

==== Counties that flipped from Republican to Democratic ====
- Alpine (largest municipality: Markleeville)
- Mono (largest municipality: Mammoth Lakes)

=== By congressional district ===
Kerry won 31 of 53 congressional districts, with the remaining 22 going to Bush, including two that elected Democrats.

District	Bush	Kerry	Representative
1st	38%	60%	Mike Thompson
2nd	62%	37%	Wally Herger
3rd	58%	41%	Doug Ose
3rd	58%	41%	Dan Lungren
4th	61%	37%	John Doolittle
5th	38%	61%	Bob Matsui
6th	28%	70%	Lynn Woolsey
7th	32%	67%	George Miller
8th	14%	84%	Nancy Pelosi
9th	13%	86%	Barbara Lee
10th	40%	59%	Ellen Tauscher
11th	54%	45%	Richard Pombo
12th	27%	72%	Tom Lantos
13th	28%	71%	Pete Stark
14th	30%	68%	Anna Eshoo
15th	36%	63%	Mike Honda
16th	36%	63%	Zoe Lofgren
17th	33%	66%	Sam Farr
18th	50%	49%	Dennis Cardoza
19th	61%	38%	George Radanovich
20th	48%	51%	Cal Dooley
20th	48%	51%	Jim Costa
21st	65%	34%	Devin Nunes
22nd	68%	31%	Bill Thomas
23rd	40%	58%	Lois Capps
24th	56%	43%	Elton Gallegly
25th	59%	40%	Howard McKeon
26th	55%	44%	David Dreier
27th	39%	59%	Brad Sherman
28th	28%	71%	Howard Berman
29th	37%	61%	Adam Schiff
30th	33%	66%	Henry Waxman
31st	22%	77%	Xavier Becerra
32nd	37%	62%	Hilda Solis
33rd	16%	83%	Diane Watson
34th	30%	69%	Lucille Roybal-Allard
35th	20%	79%	Maxine Waters
36th	40%	59%	Jane Harman
37th	25%	74%	Juanita Millender-McDonald
38th	34%	65%	Grace Napolitano
39th	40%	59%	Linda Sánchez
40th	60%	38%	Ed Royce
41st	62%	37%	Jerry Lewis
42nd	62%	37%	Gary Miller
43rd	41%	58%	Joe Baca
44th	59%	40%	Ken Calvert
45th	56%	43%	Mary Bono Mack
46th	57%	42%	Dana Rohrabacher
47th	50%	49%	Loretta Sanchez
48th	58%	40%	Christopher Cox
48th	58%	40%	John Campbell
49th	63%	36%	Darrell Issa
50th	55%	44%	Brian Bilbray
51st	46%	53%	Bob Filner
52nd	61%	38%	Duncan Hunter
53rd	38%	61%	Susan Davis

=== By city ===
By municipality

Official outcome by city and unincorporated areas of counties, of which Kerry won 266, Bush won 265, and 2 had tied outcomes.
City	County	John Kerry Democratic		George W. Bush Republican		Various candidates Other parties		Margin		Total Votes	2000 to 2004 Swing %
City	County	#	%	#	%	#	%	#	%	Total Votes	2000 to 2004 Swing %
Alameda	Alameda	23,981	74.65%	7,698	23.96%	444	1.38%	16,283	50.69%	32,123	9.29%
Albany	Alameda	7,134	87.84%	868	10.69%	120	1.48%	6,266	77.15%	8,122	11.81%
Berkeley	Alameda	54,409	91.22%	4,010	6.72%	1,224	2.05%	50,399	84.50%	59,643	14.10%
Dublin	Alameda	7,534	56.64%	5,635	42.37%	132	0.99%	1,899	14.28%	13,301	5.03%
Emeryville	Alameda	3,166	86.60%	420	11.49%	70	1.91%	2,746	75.11%	3,656	10.69%
Fremont	Alameda	45,706	66.57%	22,236	32.39%	717	1.04%	23,470	34.18%	68,659	7.93%
Hayward	Alameda	28,412	74.38%	9,350	24.48%	437	1.14%	19,062	49.90%	38,199	3.18%
Livermore	Alameda	17,045	49.93%	16,728	49.00%	368	1.08%	317	0.93%	34,141	1.08%
Newark	Alameda	9,507	68.67%	4,189	30.26%	148	1.07%	5,318	38.41%	13,844	4.15%
Oakland	Alameda	132,167	89.22%	13,834	9.34%	2,141	1.45%	118,333	79.88%	148,142	6.84%
Piedmont	Alameda	4,907	72.42%	1,799	26.55%	70	1.03%	3,108	45.87%	6,776	17.27%
Pleasanton	Alameda	16,469	52.40%	14,663	46.65%	300	0.95%	1,806	5.75%	31,432	6.20%
San Leandro	Alameda	22,199	73.66%	7,629	25.31%	311	1.03%	14,570	48.34%	30,139	5.19%
Union City	Alameda	14,904	73.55%	5,173	25.53%	186	0.92%	9,731	48.02%	20,263	1.35%
Unincorporated Area	Alameda	35,045	67.01%	16,679	31.89%	578	1.11%	18,366	35.12%	52,302	5.27%
Unincorporated Area	Alpine	373	53.36%	311	44.49%	15	2.15%	62	8.87%	699	11.60%
Amador City	Amador	57	44.19%	71	55.04%	1	0.78%	-14	-10.85%	129	-8.93%
Ione	Amador	483	29.89%	1,116	69.06%	17	1.05%	-633	-39.17%	1,616	-8.82%
Jackson	Amador	812	40.02%	1,197	58.99%	20	0.99%	-385	-18.97%	2,029	-8.88%
Plymouth	Amador	171	35.19%	309	63.58%	6	1.23%	-138	-28.40%	486	-7.75%
Sutter Creek	Amador	575	43.23%	735	55.26%	20	1.50%	-160	-12.03%	1,330	0.31%
Unincorporated Area	Amador	2,630	36.60%	4,467	62.16%	89	1.24%	-1,837	-25.56%	7,186	-6.27%
Unapportioned Absentees	Amador	1,813	35.74%	3,212	63.32%	48	0.95%	-1,399	-27.58%	5,073	N/A
Biggs	Butte	194	35.40%	349	63.69%	5	0.91%	-155	-28.28%	548	3.56%
Chico	Butte	17,482	55.37%	13,502	42.77%	588	1.86%	3,980	12.61%	31,572	14.78%
Gridley	Butte	681	41.50%	941	57.34%	19	1.16%	-260	-15.84%	1,641	-3.59%
Oroville	Butte	1,568	39.58%	2,318	58.51%	76	1.92%	-750	-18.93%	3,962	-4.22%
Paradise	Butte	5,738	40.64%	8,164	57.82%	218	1.54%	-2,426	-17.18%	14,120	3.98%
Unincorporated Area	Butte	16,785	38.24%	26,388	60.12%	719	1.64%	-9,603	-21.88%	43,892	2.39%
Angels	Calaveras	301	34.13%	565	64.06%	16	1.81%	-264	-29.93%	882	-6.53%
Unincorporated Area	Calaveras	4,213	38.31%	6,580	59.83%	204	1.86%	-2,367	-21.52%	10,997	-4.55%
Unapportioned Absentees	Calaveras	3,772	36.18%	6,456	61.92%	199	1.91%	-2,684	-25.74%	10,427	N/A
Colusa	Colusa	638	33.39%	1,252	65.52%	21	1.10%	-614	-32.13%	1,911	-4.16%
Williams	Colusa	314	41.70%	427	56.71%	12	1.59%	-113	-15.01%	753	-7.40%
Unincorporated Area	Colusa	995	28.41%	2,463	70.33%	44	1.26%	-1,468	-41.92%	3,502	-0.16%
Antioch	Contra Costa	20,670	61.86%	12,472	37.33%	271	0.81%	8,198	24.54%	33,413	1.16%
Brentwood	Contra Costa	7,187	47.42%	7,882	52.01%	86	0.57%	-695	-4.59%	15,155	-4.65%
Clayton	Contra Costa	2,979	46.66%	3,357	52.58%	48	0.75%	-378	-5.92%	6,384	2.53%
Concord	Contra Costa	28,234	61.35%	17,272	37.53%	514	1.12%	10,962	23.82%	46,020	3.47%
Danville	Contra Costa	11,106	47.22%	12,235	52.02%	181	0.77%	-1,129	-4.80%	23,522	5.20%
El Cerrito	Contra Costa	9,876	83.72%	1,724	14.62%	196	1.66%	8,152	69.11%	11,796	12.63%
Hercules	Contra Costa	6,659	75.57%	2,085	23.66%	68	0.77%	4,574	51.91%	8,812	2.73%
Lafayette	Contra Costa	8,520	60.27%	5,435	38.45%	181	1.28%	3,085	21.82%	14,136	12.50%
Martinez	Contra Costa	11,346	63.31%	6,324	35.29%	251	1.40%	5,022	28.02%	17,921	3.91%
Moraga	Contra Costa	5,062	56.26%	3,835	42.62%	101	1.12%	1,227	13.64%	8,998	14.27%
Oakley	Contra Costa	4,937	53.42%	4,222	45.69%	82	0.89%	715	7.74%	9,241	-5.66%
Orinda	Contra Costa	7,025	61.53%	4,245	37.18%	148	1.30%	2,780	24.35%	11,418	17.18%
Pinole	Contra Costa	5,604	69.76%	2,356	29.33%	73	0.91%	3,248	40.43%	8,033	4.82%
Pittsburg	Contra Costa	12,146	71.41%	4,724	27.77%	139	0.82%	7,422	43.64%	17,009	-2.95%
Pleasant Hill	Contra Costa	10,310	64.08%	5,576	34.66%	204	1.27%	4,734	29.42%	16,090	8.15%
Richmond	Contra Costa	26,508	85.94%	4,012	13.01%	326	1.06%	22,496	72.93%	30,846	2.13%
San Pablo	Contra Costa	4,549	82.35%	912	16.51%	63	1.14%	3,637	65.84%	5,524	-1.68%
San Ramon	Contra Costa	12,872	53.05%	11,172	46.04%	221	0.91%	1,700	7.01%	24,265	7.73%
Walnut Creek	Contra Costa	21,898	60.27%	14,034	38.63%	400	1.10%	7,864	21.64%	36,332	9.51%
Unincorporated Area	Contra Costa	39,766	59.15%	26,734	39.77%	724	1.08%	13,032	19.39%	67,224	3.39%
Crescent City	Del Norte	576	48.12%	593	49.54%	28	2.34%	-17	-1.42%	1,197	5.18%
Unincorporated Area	Del Norte	0	0.00%	0	0.00%	134	100.00%	N/A	N/A	134	N/A (Note: A likely case of a tabulation error.)
Unapportioned Absentees	Del Norte	3,316	40.99%	4,763	58.88%	11	0.14%	-1,447	-17.89%	8,090	N/A
Placerville	El Dorado	1,918	43.58%	2,419	54.96%	64	1.45%	-501	-11.38%	4,401	-0.13%
South Lake Tahoe	El Dorado	4,123	59.55%	2,685	38.78%	116	1.68%	1,438	20.77%	6,924	4.90%
Unincorporated Area	El Dorado	26,201	34.96%	47,774	63.74%	978	1.30%	-21,573	-28.78%	74,953	-2.60%
Clovis	Fresno	10,087	31.03%	22,219	68.34%	205	0.63%	-12,132	-37.32%	32,511	-6.90%
Coalinga	Fresno	908	33.65%	1,773	65.72%	17	0.63%	-865	-32.06%	2,698	-11.42%
Firebaugh	Fresno	540	53.05%	471	46.27%	7	0.69%	69	6.78%	1,018	-13.03%
Fowler	Fresno	597	46.21%	687	53.17%	8	0.62%	-90	-6.97%	1,292	-17.19%
Fresno	Fresno	59,105	47.33%	64,639	51.77%	1,122	0.90%	-5,534	-4.43%	124,866	-3.52%
Huron	Fresno	458	80.35%	108	18.95%	4	0.70%	350	61.40%	570	-11.31%
Kerman	Fresno	1,100	48.98%	1,133	50.45%	13	0.58%	-33	-1.47%	2,246	-5.79%
Kingsburg	Fresno	1,069	25.21%	3,140	74.04%	32	0.75%	-2,071	-48.83%	4,241	-10.35%
Mendota	Fresno	676	65.82%	341	33.20%	10	0.97%	335	32.62%	1,027	-28.87%
Orange Cove	Fresno	474	62.29%	284	37.32%	3	0.39%	190	24.97%	761	-20.37%
Parlier	Fresno	1,117	71.15%	442	28.15%	11	0.70%	675	42.99%	1,570	-23.14%
Reedley	Fresno	2,044	38.59%	3,191	60.24%	62	1.17%	-1,147	-21.65%	5,297	-4.59%
San Joaquin	Fresno	220	69.40%	95	29.97%	2	0.63%	125	39.43%	317	-19.56%
Sanger	Fresno	2,402	53.77%	2,037	45.60%	28	0.63%	365	8.17%	4,467	-19.45%
Selma	Fresno	2,388	47.75%	2,586	51.71%	27	0.54%	-198	-3.96%	5,001	-12.35%
Unincorporated Area	Fresno	19,969	33.69%	38,842	65.53%	467	0.79%	-18,873	-31.84%	59,278	-4.72%
Orland	Glenn	705	36.43%	1,202	62.12%	28	1.45%	-497	-25.68%	1,935	5.31%
Willows	Glenn	674	33.47%	1,307	64.90%	33	1.64%	-633	-31.43%	2,014	0.69%
Unincorporated Area	Glenn	1,616	29.46%	3,799	69.25%	71	1.29%	-2,183	-39.79%	5,486	2.23%
Arcata	Humboldt	8,137	79.02%	1,696	16.47%	464	4.51%	6,441	62.55%	10,297	26.48%
Blue Lake	Humboldt	437	61.90%	249	35.27%	20	2.83%	188	26.63%	706	16.78%
Eureka	Humboldt	6,842	57.90%	4,639	39.26%	335	2.84%	2,203	18.64%	11,816	12.61%
Ferndale	Humboldt	351	42.39%	463	55.92%	14	1.69%	-112	-13.53%	828	3.96%
Fortuna	Humboldt	5,937	45.69%	6,770	52.10%	286	2.20%	-833	-6.41%	12,993	17.84%
Rio Dell	Humboldt	469	37.76%	752	60.55%	21	1.69%	-283	-22.79%	1,242	13.80%
Trinidad	Humboldt	188	71.48%	69	26.24%	6	2.28%	119	45.25%	263	25.07%
Unincorporated Area	Humboldt	15,627	57.11%	11,076	40.48%	662	2.42%	4,551	16.63%	27,365	18.69%
Brawley	Imperial	2,251	52.51%	1,989	46.40%	47	1.10%	262	6.11%	4,287	-2.23%
Calexico	Imperial	3,471	73.38%	1,190	25.16%	69	1.46%	2,281	48.22%	4,730	-5.09%
Calipatria	Imperial	259	50.19%	248	48.06%	9	1.74%	11	2.13%	516	-19.56%
El Centro	Imperial	3,952	53.61%	3,343	45.35%	77	1.04%	609	8.26%	7,372	1.46%
Holtville	Imperial	479	49.43%	479	49.43%	11	1.14%	0	0.00%	969	17.65%
Imperial	Imperial	853	41.19%	1,197	57.80%	21	1.01%	-344	-16.61%	2,071	-2.72%
Westmorland	Imperial	190	52.49%	164	45.30%	8	2.21%	26	7.18%	362	-11.49%
Unincorporated Area	Imperial	2,446	42.78%	3,201	55.98%	71	1.24%	-755	-13.20%	5,718	-10.66%
Unapportioned Absentees	Imperial	4,063	49.25%	4,079	49.45%	107	1.30%	-16	-0.19%	8,249	N/A
Bishop	Inyo	634	42.58%	829	55.67%	26	1.75%	-195	-13.10%	1,489	10.41%
Unincorporated Area	Inyo	2,716	38.19%	4,262	59.94%	133	1.87%	-1,546	-21.74%	7,111	5.21%
Arvin	Kern	1,118	61.33%	690	37.85%	15	0.82%	428	23.48%	1,823	-15.62%
Bakersfield	Kern	30,777	33.46%	60,578	65.87%	613	0.67%	-29,801	-32.40%	91,968	-8.36%
California City	Kern	905	28.73%	2,213	70.25%	32	1.02%	-1,308	-41.52%	3,150	-14.44%
Delano	Kern	3,554	61.74%	2,164	37.60%	38	0.66%	1,390	24.15%	5,756	-14.88%
Maricopa	Kern	70	19.66%	284	79.78%	2	0.56%	-214	-60.11%	356	-16.82%
McFarland	Kern	819	62.47%	480	36.61%	12	0.92%	339	25.86%	1,311	-22.62%
Ridgecrest	Kern	2,919	26.49%	7,948	72.12%	153	1.39%	-5,029	-45.64%	11,020	-0.46%
Shafter	Kern	1,007	38.73%	1,577	60.65%	16	0.62%	-570	-21.92%	2,600	-9.21%
Taft	Kern	465	19.37%	1,917	79.84%	19	0.79%	-1,452	-60.47%	2,401	-10.31%
Tehachapi	Kern	830	31.31%	1,791	67.56%	30	1.13%	-961	-36.25%	2,651	-9.82%
Wasco	Kern	1,392	46.62%	1,569	52.55%	25	0.84%	-177	-5.93%	2,986	-14.92%
Unincorporated Area	Kern	24,747	29.17%	59,206	69.79%	883	1.04%	-34,459	-40.62%	84,836	-10.72%
Avenal	Kings	441	50.92%	412	47.58%	13	1.50%	29	3.35%	866	-17.14%
Corcoran	Kings	1,047	48.74%	1,087	50.61%	14	0.65%	-40	-1.86%	2,148	-18.82%
Hanford	Kings	4,941	34.05%	9,439	65.05%	130	0.90%	-4,498	-31.00%	14,510	-10.12%
Lemoore	Kings	1,874	30.25%	4,277	69.03%	45	0.73%	-2,403	-38.78%	6,196	-10.37%
Unincorporated Area	Kings	2,530	30.22%	5,788	69.13%	55	0.66%	-3,258	-38.91%	8,373	-14.45%
Clearlake	Lake	2,434	61.70%	1,439	36.48%	72	1.83%	995	25.22%	3,945	-7.05%
Lakeport	Lake	1,064	50.19%	1,032	48.68%	24	1.13%	32	1.51%	2,120	4.41%
Unincorporated Area	Lake	9,643	51.85%	8,622	46.36%	333	1.79%	1,021	5.49%	18,598	-0.68%
Susanville	Lassen	1,139	30.60%	2,532	68.03%	51	1.37%	-1,393	-37.43%	3,722	-4.76%
Unincorporated Area	Lassen	2,019	26.17%	5,594	72.51%	102	1.32%	-3,575	-46.34%	7,715	-4.58%
Agoura Hills	Los Angeles	4,279	52.70%	3,752	46.21%	89	1.10%	527	6.49%	8,120	-9.61%
Alhambra	Los Angeles	15,440	63.89%	8,420	34.84%	308	1.27%	7,020	29.05%	24,168	-7.90%
Arcadia	Los Angeles	18,912	43.13%	24,339	55.51%	598	1.36%	-5,427	-12.38%	43,849	2.50%
Artesia	Los Angeles	6,051	51.40%	5,572	47.33%	150	1.27%	479	4.07%	11,773	-21.07%
Avalon	Los Angeles	7,427	48.41%	7,709	50.24%	207	1.35%	-282	-1.84%	15,343	0.00%
Azusa	Los Angeles	8,337	55.65%	6,445	43.02%	198	1.32%	1,892	12.63%	14,980	-6.09%
Baldwin Park	Los Angeles	8,963	70.58%	3,641	28.67%	95	0.75%	5,322	41.91%	12,699	-15.34%
Bell	Los Angeles	4,369	75.68%	1,317	22.81%	87	1.51%	3,052	52.87%	5,773	-9.31%
Bell Gardens	Los Angeles	4,217	78.12%	1,116	20.67%	65	1.20%	3,101	57.45%	5,398	-14.08%
Bellflower	Los Angeles	10,723	55.99%	8,127	42.43%	302	1.58%	2,596	13.55%	19,152	-10.49%
Beverly Hills	Los Angeles	13,691	62.09%	8,168	37.04%	190	0.86%	5,523	25.05%	22,049	-30.99%
Burbank	Los Angeles	33,170	56.80%	24,415	41.81%	814	1.39%	8,755	14.99%	58,399	-4.03%
Calabasas	Los Angeles	4,531	57.41%	3,292	41.71%	69	0.87%	1,239	15.70%	7,892	-13.49%
Carson	Los Angeles	23,006	70.93%	9,122	28.12%	306	0.94%	13,884	42.81%	32,434	-13.47%
Cerritos	Los Angeles	8,028	52.02%	7,279	47.17%	125	0.81%	749	4.85%	15,432	-8.11%
Claremont	Los Angeles	7,795	58.93%	5,229	39.53%	203	1.53%	2,566	19.40%	13,227	2.41%
Commerce	Los Angeles	2,813	78.84%	709	19.87%	46	1.29%	2,104	58.97%	3,568	-13.96%
Compton	Los Angeles	19,035	90.43%	1,802	8.56%	213	1.01%	17,233	81.87%	21,050	-9.32%
Covina	Los Angeles	7,959	47.83%	8,517	51.18%	164	0.99%	-558	-3.35%	16,640	-8.40%
Cudahy	Los Angeles	2,235	76.23%	655	22.34%	42	1.43%	1,580	53.89%	2,932	-16.21%
Culver City	Los Angeles	16,158	74.67%	5,264	24.33%	218	1.01%	10,894	50.34%	21,640	2.91%
Diamond Bar	Los Angeles	11,218	47.98%	11,937	51.05%	227	0.97%	-719	-3.08%	23,382	-5.91%
Downey	Los Angeles	18,125	54.60%	14,669	44.19%	402	1.21%	3,456	10.41%	33,196	-7.50%
Duarte	Los Angeles	4,529	58.15%	3,150	40.44%	110	1.41%	1,379	17.70%	7,789	-6.60%
El Monte	Los Angeles	11,426	67.32%	5,372	31.65%	174	1.03%	6,054	35.67%	16,972	-14.71%
El Segundo	Los Angeles	3,864	45.16%	4,554	53.23%	138	1.61%	-690	-8.06%	8,556	-2.71%
Gardena	Los Angeles	12,210	69.83%	5,091	29.11%	185	1.06%	7,119	40.71%	17,486	-10.30%
Glendale	Los Angeles	26,911	58.64%	18,342	39.97%	638	1.39%	8,569	18.67%	45,891	10.71%
Glendora	Los Angeles	6,652	36.10%	11,535	62.61%	238	1.29%	-4,883	-26.50%	18,425	-4.18%
Hawaiian Gardens	Los Angeles	1,207	66.17%	590	32.35%	27	1.48%	617	33.83%	1,824	-10.80%
Hawthorne	Los Angeles	14,477	72.70%	5,225	26.24%	210	1.05%	9,252	46.46%	19,912	-6.48%
Hermosa Beach	Los Angeles	14,779	52.87%	12,791	45.75%	386	1.38%	1,988	7.11%	27,956	-4.79%
Hidden Hills	Los Angeles	392	46.50%	442	52.43%	9	1.07%	-50	-5.93%	843	-15.35%
Huntington Park	Los Angeles	6,752	79.16%	1,674	19.62%	104	1.22%	5,078	59.53%	8,530	-9.40%
Industry	Los Angeles	0	0.00%	1	100.00%	0	0.00%	-1	-100.00%	1	N/A (Note: No votes recorded in 2000.)
Inglewood	Los Angeles	28,391	88.43%	3,487	10.86%	229	0.71%	24,904	77.57%	32,107	-6.37%
Irwindale	Los Angeles	275	69.62%	117	29.62%	3	0.76%	158	40.00%	395	-15.25%
La Canada Flintridge	Los Angeles	3,245	44.22%	3,999	54.49%	95	1.29%	-754	-10.27%	7,339	9.35%
La Habra Heights	Los Angeles	1,023	31.00%	2,228	67.52%	49	1.48%	-1,205	-36.52%	3,300	2.53%
La Mirada	Los Angeles	8,103	40.90%	11,492	58.00%	219	1.11%	-3,389	-17.10%	19,814	-9.92%
La Puente	Los Angeles	5,340	71.43%	2,067	27.65%	69	0.92%	3,273	43.78%	7,476	-12.29%
La Verne	Los Angeles	4,922	40.73%	7,036	58.22%	127	1.05%	-2,114	-17.49%	12,085	-6.26%
Lakewood	Los Angeles	15,794	49.05%	16,005	49.70%	403	1.25%	-211	-0.66%	32,202	-9.30%
Lancaster	Los Angeles	12,453	39.03%	19,046	59.70%	404	1.27%	-6,593	-20.67%	31,903	-3.94%
Lawndale	Los Angeles	3,954	65.44%	2,028	33.57%	60	0.99%	1,926	31.88%	6,042	-7.96%
Lomita	Los Angeles	3,106	50.77%	2,941	48.07%	71	1.16%	165	2.70%	6,118	-0.63%
Long Beach	Los Angeles	77,359	64.40%	41,046	34.17%	1,710	1.42%	36,313	30.23%	120,115	-1.10%
Los Angeles	Los Angeles	785,489	71.36%	301,097	27.35%	14,179	1.29%	484,392	44.01%	1,100,765	-6.88%
Lynwood	Los Angeles	9,334	83.47%	1,716	15.34%	133	1.19%	7,618	68.12%	11,183	-12.27%
Malibu	Los Angeles	4,911	59.68%	3,204	38.94%	114	1.39%	1,707	20.74%	8,229	-0.64%
Manhattan Beach	Los Angeles	7,571	51.63%	6,900	47.05%	194	1.32%	671	4.58%	14,665	2.71%
Maywood	Los Angeles	2,894	81.73%	606	17.11%	41	1.16%	2,288	64.61%	3,541	-9.85%
Monrovia	Los Angeles	5,809	53.40%	4,917	45.20%	152	1.40%	892	8.20%	10,878	-2.41%
Montebello	Los Angeles	12,311	70.00%	5,085	28.91%	192	1.09%	7,226	41.08%	17,588	-9.40%
Monterey Park	Los Angeles	12,249	62.91%	7,012	36.01%	211	1.08%	5,237	26.90%	19,472	-9.19%
Norwalk	Los Angeles	16,313	61.16%	10,025	37.59%	333	1.25%	6,288	23.58%	26,671	-13.54%
Palmdale	Los Angeles	13,991	48.24%	14,673	50.59%	337	1.16%	-682	-2.35%	29,001	-4.66%
Palos Verdes Estates	Los Angeles	2,099	38.40%	3,316	60.67%	51	0.93%	-1,217	-22.26%	5,466	4.50%
Paramount	Los Angeles	6,876	73.15%	2,397	25.50%	127	1.35%	4,479	47.65%	9,400	-14.09%
Pasadena	Los Angeles	27,062	68.24%	11,955	30.15%	639	1.61%	15,107	38.10%	39,656	6.18%
Pico Rivera	Los Angeles	13,599	71.17%	5,304	27.76%	204	1.07%	8,295	43.41%	19,107	-14.98%
Pomona	Los Angeles	20,421	64.44%	10,878	34.33%	390	1.23%	9,543	30.11%	31,689	-9.79%
Rancho Palos Verdes	Los Angeles	6,925	45.57%	8,092	53.25%	178	1.17%	-1,167	-7.68%	15,195	5.91%
Redondo Beach	Los Angeles	13,075	54.12%	10,737	44.44%	346	1.43%	2,338	9.68%	24,158	-1.04%
Rolling Hills	Los Angeles	226	28.46%	558	70.28%	10	1.26%	-332	-41.81%	794	8.98%
Rolling Hills Estates	Los Angeles	1,312	39.13%	2,005	59.80%	36	1.07%	-693	-20.67%	3,353	6.35%
Rosemead	Los Angeles	5,888	66.39%	2,872	32.38%	109	1.23%	3,016	34.01%	8,869	-11.83%
San Dimas	Los Angeles	5,159	40.39%	7,480	58.57%	133	1.04%	-2,321	-18.17%	12,772	-6.93%
San Fernando	Los Angeles	3,637	71.30%	1,399	27.43%	65	1.27%	2,238	43.87%	5,101	-11.64%
San Gabriel	Los Angeles	4,230	58.39%	2,938	40.55%	77	1.06%	1,292	17.83%	7,245	-5.30%
San Marino	Los Angeles	2,404	36.78%	4,062	62.14%	71	1.09%	-1,658	-25.36%	6,537	8.19%
Santa Clarita	Los Angeles	25,657	39.26%	39,007	59.68%	695	1.06%	-13,350	-20.43%	65,359	-7.47%
Santa Fe Springs	Los Angeles	3,546	62.53%	2,047	36.10%	78	1.38%	1,499	26.43%	5,671	-16.39%
Santa Monica	Los Angeles	36,676	75.06%	11,569	23.68%	617	1.26%	25,107	51.38%	48,862	1.09%
Sierra Madre	Los Angeles	2,568	51.97%	2,286	46.27%	87	1.76%	282	5.71%	4,941	6.62%
Signal Hill	Los Angeles	1,891	63.63%	1,037	34.89%	44	1.48%	854	28.73%	2,972	-6.41%
South El Monte	Los Angeles	2,515	73.54%	866	25.32%	39	1.14%	1,649	48.22%	3,420	-14.52%
South Gate	Los Angeles	13,186	76.63%	3,801	22.09%	221	1.28%	9,385	54.54%	17,208	-9.45%
South Pasadena	Los Angeles	7,671	62.72%	4,387	35.87%	172	1.41%	3,284	26.85%	12,230	5.06%
Temple City	Los Angeles	4,869	50.97%	4,588	48.03%	96	1.00%	281	2.94%	9,553	-2.97%
Torrance	Los Angeles	27,747	45.93%	31,923	52.85%	736	1.22%	-4,176	-6.91%	60,406	-2.61%
Vernon	Los Angeles	15	48.39%	15	48.39%	1	3.23%	0	0.00%	31	N/A
Walnut	Los Angeles	5,869	51.13%	5,507	47.97%	103	0.90%	362	3.15%	11,479	-6.60%
West Covina	Los Angeles	14,941	56.92%	11,087	42.24%	219	0.83%	3,854	14.68%	26,247	-8.84%
West Hollywood	Los Angeles	12,157	82.50%	2,434	16.52%	144	0.98%	9,723	65.99%	14,735	-9.05%
Westlake Village	Los Angeles	1,634	46.46%	1,853	52.69%	30	0.85%	-219	-6.23%	3,517	1.04%
Whittier	Los Angeles	14,644	49.33%	14,713	49.56%	329	1.11%	-69	-0.23%	29,686	-5.74%
Unincorporated Area	Los Angeles	224,719	57.94%	158,122	40.77%	4,977	1.28%	66,597	17.17%	387,818	-17.07%
Chowchilla	Madera	709	31.16%	1,544	67.87%	22	0.97%	-835	-36.70%	2,275	-11.03%
Madera	Madera	4,252	44.45%	5,236	54.74%	78	0.82%	-984	-10.29%	9,566	-7.93%
Unincorporated Area	Madera	8,520	31.63%	18,091	67.16%	328	1.22%	-9,571	-35.53%	26,939	-1.59%
Belvedere	Marin	810	57.65%	579	41.21%	16	1.14%	231	16.44%	1,405	19.50%
Corte Madera	Marin	4,043	76.20%	1,199	22.60%	64	1.21%	2,844	53.60%	5,306	8.79%
Fairfax	Marin	4,132	86.34%	586	12.24%	68	1.42%	3,546	74.09%	4,786	14.14%
Larkspur	Marin	5,553	74.63%	1,827	24.55%	61	0.82%	3,726	50.07%	7,441	13.45%
Mill Valley	Marin	7,180	81.91%	1,500	17.11%	86	0.98%	5,680	64.80%	8,766	13.41%
Novato	Marin	15,705	64.47%	8,426	34.59%	229	0.94%	7,279	29.88%	24,360	8.11%
Ross	Marin	927	63.28%	524	35.77%	14	0.96%	403	27.51%	1,465	17.07%
San Anselmo	Marin	6,290	82.99%	1,210	15.97%	79	1.04%	5,080	67.03%	7,579	13.16%
San Rafael	Marin	18,932	73.41%	6,545	25.38%	313	1.21%	12,387	48.03%	25,790	11.76%
Sausalito	Marin	3,677	77.02%	1,046	21.91%	51	1.07%	2,631	55.11%	4,774	11.92%
Tiburon	Marin	3,680	67.08%	1,766	32.19%	40	0.73%	1,914	34.89%	5,486	12.70%
Unincorporated Area	Marin	28,141	74.52%	9,170	24.28%	450	1.19%	18,971	50.24%	37,761	13.51%
Unincorporated Area	Mariposa	3,251	37.64%	5,215	60.37%	172	1.99%	-1,964	-22.74%	8,638	0.93%
Fort Bragg	Mendocino	1,894	68.72%	818	29.68%	44	1.60%	1,076	39.04%	2,756	16.14%
Point Arena	Mendocino	153	79.69%	39	20.31%	0	0.00%	114	59.38%	192	18.89%
Ukiah	Mendocino	3,530	59.81%	2,262	38.33%	110	1.86%	1,268	21.48%	5,902	10.43%
Willits	Mendocino	1,079	62.44%	617	35.71%	32	1.85%	462	26.74%	1,728	15.43%
Unincorporated Area	Mendocino	17,729	64.23%	9,219	33.40%	653	2.37%	8,510	30.83%	27,601	18.94%
Atwater	Merced	2,662	38.94%	4,100	59.98%	74	1.08%	-1,438	-21.04%	6,836	-9.02%
Dos Palos	Merced	488	40.60%	702	58.40%	12	1.00%	-214	-17.80%	1,202	-1.18%
Gustine	Merced	752	47.72%	801	50.82%	23	1.46%	-49	-3.11%	1,576	-15.12%
Livingston	Merced	1,160	66.78%	547	31.49%	30	1.73%	613	35.29%	1,737	-14.82%
Los Banos	Merced	3,711	49.85%	3,639	48.89%	94	1.26%	72	0.97%	7,444	-7.02%
Merced	Merced	8,139	45.13%	9,679	53.67%	217	1.20%	-1,540	-8.54%	18,035	-7.40%
Unincorporated Area	Merced	7,579	35.89%	13,305	63.01%	231	1.09%	-5,726	-27.12%	21,115	-7.87%
Alturas	Modoc	415	33.15%	817	65.26%	20	1.60%	-402	-32.11%	1,252	9.06%
Unincorporated Area	Modoc	734	22.91%	2,418	75.47%	52	1.62%	-1,684	-52.56%	3,204	1.82%
Mammoth Lakes	Mono	1,522	57.61%	1,077	40.76%	43	1.63%	445	16.84%	2,642	18.36%
Unincorporated Area	Mono	1,106	41.15%	1,544	57.44%	38	1.41%	-438	-16.29%	2,688	4.73%
Carmel-by-the-Sea	Monterey (Note: From California's Supplement to the Statement of Vote referring to Monterey County: "The sum of the vote results in the supervisorial districts is less than the county total for some Presidential and US Senate candidates. County vote reporting system was programmed to identify overseas voter ballots as a unique, federal-only precinct. These federal-only precincts were not included in the supervisorial precinct report." This explains why Kerry's vote total in Monterey County and statewide is 195 lower than stated elsewhere, and Bush's total is 59 votes lower.)	1,634	59.70%	1,074	39.24%	29	1.06%	560	20.46%	2,737	15.13%
Del Rey Oaks	Monterey	600	62.57%	342	35.66%	17	1.77%	258	26.90%	959	5.05%
Gonzales	Monterey	1,180	69.17%	513	30.07%	13	0.76%	667	39.10%	1,706	-8.40%
Greenfield	Monterey	1,347	72.50%	502	27.02%	9	0.48%	845	45.48%	1,858	-11.64%
King City	Monterey	1,008	56.57%	756	42.42%	18	1.01%	252	14.14%	1,782	-5.56%
Marina	Monterey	4,162	60.69%	2,615	38.13%	81	1.18%	1,547	22.56%	6,858	-1.38%
Monterey	Monterey	8,020	65.51%	4,078	33.31%	145	1.18%	3,942	32.20%	12,243	9.19%
Pacific Grove	Monterey	5,949	68.89%	2,567	29.72%	120	1.39%	3,382	39.16%	8,636	8.75%
Salinas	Monterey	20,037	61.18%	12,358	37.73%	355	1.08%	7,679	23.45%	32,750	-6.09%
Sand City	Monterey	47	54.02%	38	43.68%	2	2.30%	9	10.34%	87	-35.71%
Seaside	Monterey	5,603	68.12%	2,519	30.63%	103	1.25%	3,084	37.50%	8,225	-3.76%
Soledad	Monterey	1,789	68.75%	791	30.40%	22	0.85%	998	38.36%	2,602	-17.87%
Unincorporated Area	Monterey	23,670	53.97%	19,636	44.77%	549	1.25%	4,034	9.20%	43,855	7.08%
American Canyon	Napa	2,190	64.97%	1,145	33.97%	36	1.07%	1,045	31.00%	3,371	0.74%
Calistoga	Napa	781	69.61%	320	28.52%	21	1.87%	461	41.09%	1,122	20.20%
Napa	Napa	11,560	61.64%	6,941	37.01%	253	1.35%	4,619	24.63%	18,754	6.71%
St. Helena	Napa	1,125	66.10%	559	32.84%	18	1.06%	566	33.25%	1,702	15.75%
Yountville	Napa	606	64.95%	307	32.90%	20	2.14%	299	32.05%	933	7.34%
Unincorporated Area	Napa	4,739	52.39%	4,162	46.01%	144	1.59%	577	6.38%	9,045	6.86%
Unapportioned Absentees	Napa	12,665	58.80%	8,625	40.05%	248	1.15%	4,040	18.76%	21,538	N/A
Grass Valley	Nevada	2,477	46.41%	2,780	52.09%	80	1.50%	-303	-5.68%	5,337	4.21%
Nevada City	Nevada	1,115	62.57%	645	36.20%	22	1.23%	470	26.37%	1,782	15.50%
Truckee	Nevada	4,069	58.06%	2,832	40.41%	107	1.53%	1,237	17.65%	7,008	10.82%
Unincorporated Area	Nevada	16,559	41.80%	22,533	56.88%	520	1.31%	-5,974	-15.08%	39,612	8.73%
Aliso Viejo	Orange	7,648	40.73%	10,964	58.39%	166	0.88%	-3,316	-17.66%	18,778	N/A (Note: City not incorporated until 2001.)
Anaheim	Orange	34,598	40.95%	48,914	57.89%	982	1.16%	-14,316	-16.94%	84,494	-8.59%
Brea	Orange	5,722	33.35%	11,248	65.56%	186	1.08%	-5,526	-32.21%	17,156	-5.09%
Buena Park	Orange	9,928	44.10%	12,343	54.83%	242	1.07%	-2,415	-10.73%	22,513	-8.49%
Costa Mesa	Orange	16,442	42.91%	21,284	55.55%	590	1.54%	-4,842	-12.64%	38,316	1.43%
Cypress	Orange	7,790	39.62%	11,623	59.11%	250	1.27%	-3,833	-19.49%	19,663	-7.42%
Dana Point	Orange	6,841	38.79%	10,579	59.98%	217	1.23%	-3,738	-21.19%	17,637	0.47%
Fountain Valley	Orange	8,748	34.00%	16,678	64.82%	305	1.19%	-7,930	-30.82%	25,731	-8.74%
Fullerton	Orange	18,633	40.22%	27,114	58.53%	576	1.24%	-8,481	-18.31%	46,323	-2.81%
Garden Grove	Orange	18,055	37.73%	29,251	61.13%	545	1.14%	-11,196	-23.40%	47,851	-19.40%
Huntington Beach	Orange	35,206	38.80%	54,343	59.89%	1,182	1.30%	-19,137	-21.09%	90,731	-2.99%
Irvine	Orange	32,130	46.65%	36,005	52.28%	733	1.06%	-3,875	-5.63%	68,868	2.88%
La Habra	Orange	7,254	41.10%	10,204	57.81%	193	1.09%	-2,950	-16.71%	17,651	-6.94%
La Palma	Orange	2,607	41.98%	3,544	57.07%	59	0.95%	-937	-15.09%	6,210	-4.24%
Laguna Beach	Orange	8,168	57.15%	5,954	41.66%	170	1.19%	2,214	15.49%	14,292	5.04%
Laguna Hills	Orange	5,019	36.12%	8,711	62.68%	167	1.20%	-3,692	-26.57%	13,897	-2.10%
Laguna Niguel	Orange	11,701	37.83%	18,937	61.23%	290	0.94%	-7,236	-23.40%	30,928	0.13%
Laguna Woods	Orange	6,721	53.03%	5,838	46.06%	115	0.91%	883	6.97%	12,674	-5.06%
Lake Forest	Orange	11,200	34.71%	20,691	64.11%	381	1.18%	-9,491	-29.41%	32,272	-4.98%
Los Alamitos	Orange	2,076	42.63%	2,703	55.50%	91	1.87%	-627	-12.87%	4,870	-3.51%
Mission Viejo	Orange	16,308	34.89%	30,000	64.18%	439	0.94%	-13,692	-29.29%	46,747	-3.62%
Newport Beach	Orange	15,632	33.72%	30,240	65.24%	483	1.04%	-14,608	-31.51%	46,355	3.42%
Orange	Orange	17,549	35.47%	31,361	63.39%	566	1.14%	-13,812	-27.92%	49,476	-4.79%
Placentia	Orange	7,028	35.82%	12,390	63.15%	203	1.03%	-5,362	-27.33%	19,621	-5.51%
Rancho Santa Margarita	Orange	6,671	31.81%	14,119	67.33%	181	0.86%	-7,448	-35.52%	20,971	-5.82%
San Clemente	Orange	9,801	34.47%	18,326	64.46%	304	1.07%	-8,525	-29.98%	28,431	-0.63%
San Juan Capistrano	Orange	4,843	34.28%	9,100	64.42%	183	1.30%	-4,257	-30.14%	14,126	-1.76%
Santa Ana	Orange	28,818	54.27%	23,655	44.55%	628	1.18%	5,163	9.72%	53,101	-13.23%
Seal Beach	Orange	6,648	44.55%	8,104	54.31%	171	1.15%	-1,456	-9.76%	14,923	-5.13%
Stanton	Orange	3,588	43.49%	4,551	55.16%	111	1.35%	-963	-11.67%	8,250	-18.23%
Tustin	Orange	8,882	40.62%	12,691	58.03%	295	1.35%	-3,809	-17.42%	21,868	-1.03%
Villa Park	Orange	830	22.43%	2,838	76.70%	32	0.86%	-2,008	-54.27%	3,700	-0.92%
Westminster	Orange	10,501	34.71%	19,413	64.16%	341	1.13%	-8,912	-29.46%	30,255	-18.32%
Yorba Linda	Orange	8,617	26.88%	23,164	72.25%	279	0.87%	-14,547	-45.37%	32,060	-6.39%
Unincorporated Area	Orange	17,036	32.41%	34,952	66.50%	569	1.08%	-17,916	-34.09%	52,557	-8.83%
Auburn	Placer	3,090	43.40%	3,943	55.38%	87	1.22%	-853	-11.98%	7,120	1.59%
Colfax	Placer	307	39.56%	454	58.51%	15	1.93%	-147	-18.94%	776	-9.58%
Lincoln	Placer	4,920	36.56%	8,450	62.79%	88	0.65%	-3,530	-26.23%	13,458	-4.51%
Loomis	Placer	999	30.44%	2,253	68.65%	30	0.91%	-1,254	-38.21%	3,282	-6.60%
Rocklin	Placer	8,120	33.88%	15,648	65.28%	202	0.84%	-7,528	-31.41%	23,970	-3.96%
Roseville	Placer	17,585	36.57%	30,138	62.68%	360	0.75%	-12,553	-26.11%	48,083	-4.97%
Unincorporated Area	Placer	20,552	36.53%	35,083	62.36%	621	1.10%	-14,531	-25.83%	56,256	-1.42%
Portola	Plumas	363	41.11%	504	57.08%	16	1.81%	-141	-15.97%	883	-11.33%
Unincorporated Area	Plumas	3,766	36.58%	6,401	62.18%	128	1.24%	-2,635	-25.59%	10,295	4.23%
Banning	Riverside	4,353	42.28%	5,852	56.84%	90	0.87%	-1,499	-14.56%	10,295	-12.62%
Beaumont	Riverside	1,944	37.18%	3,215	61.48%	70	1.34%	-1,271	-24.31%	5,229	-20.83%
Blythe	Riverside	1,395	43.06%	1,812	55.93%	33	1.02%	-417	-12.87%	3,240	-13.13%
Calimesa	Riverside	1,193	35.42%	2,136	63.42%	39	1.16%	-943	-28.00%	3,368	-11.69%
Canyon Lake	Riverside	1,264	24.55%	3,850	74.79%	34	0.66%	-2,586	-50.23%	5,148	-12.74%
Cathedral City	Riverside	6,796	53.75%	5,735	45.36%	112	0.89%	1,061	8.39%	12,643	-3.18%
Coachella	Riverside	2,409	74.24%	804	24.78%	32	0.99%	1,605	49.46%	3,245	-21.43%
Corona	Riverside	16,428	38.20%	26,192	60.91%	380	0.88%	-9,764	-22.71%	43,000	-10.81%
Desert Hot Springs	Riverside	2,052	49.55%	2,027	48.95%	62	1.50%	25	0.60%	4,141	-6.24%
Hemet	Riverside	9,024	38.49%	14,161	60.41%	258	1.10%	-5,137	-21.91%	23,443	-12.03%
Indian Wells	Riverside	686	26.27%	1,909	73.11%	16	0.61%	-1,223	-46.84%	2,611	4.41%
Indio	Riverside	6,114	51.39%	5,678	47.72%	106	0.89%	436	3.66%	11,898	-19.02%
La Quinta	Riverside	4,324	34.46%	8,134	64.83%	89	0.71%	-3,810	-30.37%	12,547	-5.34%
Lake Elsinore	Riverside	3,443	36.76%	5,811	62.05%	111	1.19%	-2,368	-25.29%	9,365	-17.64%
Moreno Valley	Riverside	21,417	52.59%	18,907	46.43%	398	0.98%	2,510	6.16%	40,722	-8.68%
Murrieta	Riverside	8,988	29.60%	21,136	69.61%	238	0.78%	-12,148	-40.01%	30,362	-8.06%
Norco	Riverside	2,497	28.60%	6,143	70.35%	92	1.05%	-3,646	-41.75%	8,732	-13.39%
Palm Desert	Riverside	7,911	38.98%	12,236	60.30%	146	0.72%	-4,325	-21.31%	20,293	-2.20%
Palm Springs	Riverside	11,601	62.28%	6,878	36.92%	148	0.79%	4,723	25.36%	18,627	7.63%
Perris	Riverside	4,406	57.17%	3,211	41.66%	90	1.17%	1,195	15.51%	7,707	-12.97%
Rancho Mirage	Riverside	3,441	41.73%	4,772	57.87%	33	0.40%	-1,331	-16.14%	8,246	-3.55%
Riverside	Riverside	37,905	46.69%	42,253	52.05%	1,022	1.26%	-4,348	-5.36%	81,180	-9.39%
San Jacinto	Riverside	3,015	38.85%	4,668	60.15%	77	0.99%	-1,653	-21.30%	7,760	-13.78%
Temecula	Riverside	8,330	30.27%	18,977	68.95%	216	0.78%	-10,647	-38.68%	27,523	-7.48%
Unincorporated Area	Riverside	57,870	37.20%	95,976	61.70%	1,711	1.10%	-38,106	-24.50%	155,557	-11.88%
Citrus Heights	Sacramento	12,678	38.54%	19,885	60.44%	336	1.02%	-7,207	-21.91%	32,899	-8.46%
Elk Grove	Sacramento	21,293	45.99%	24,659	53.26%	344	0.74%	-3,366	-7.27%	46,296	-1.18%
Folsom	Sacramento	9,808	35.98%	17,234	63.23%	214	0.79%	-7,426	-27.25%	27,256	-2.41%
Galt	Sacramento	2,434	37.42%	4,024	61.87%	46	0.71%	-1,590	-24.45%	6,504	-12.03%
Isleton	Sacramento	197	54.42%	160	44.20%	5	1.38%	37	10.22%	362	-29.03%
Rancho Cordova	Sacramento	8,391	47.46%	9,077	51.33%	214	1.21%	-686	-3.88%	17,682	N/A (Note: City not incorporated until 2003.)
Sacramento	Sacramento	90,952	64.38%	48,892	34.61%	1,433	1.01%	42,060	29.77%	141,277	-0.88%
Unincorporated Area	Sacramento	90,904	44.45%	111,608	54.58%	1,977	0.97%	-20,704	-10.12%	204,489	-5.11%
Hollister	San Benito	6,043	58.81%	4,155	40.43%	78	0.76%	1,888	18.37%	10,276	-9.49%
San Juan Bautista	San Benito	426	62.37%	244	35.72%	13	1.90%	182	26.65%	683	0.40%
Unincorporated Area	San Benito	3,382	43.55%	4,299	55.36%	85	1.09%	-917	-11.81%	7,766	-1.83%
Adelanto	San Bernardino	1,747	46.55%	1,949	51.93%	57	1.52%	-202	-5.38%	3,753	-8.09%
Apple Valley	San Bernardino	6,809	29.97%	15,686	69.03%	228	1.00%	-8,877	-39.07%	22,723	-10.69%
Barstow	San Bernardino	2,346	42.21%	3,143	56.55%	69	1.24%	-797	-14.34%	5,558	-15.37%
Big Bear Lake	San Bernardino	866	31.55%	1,842	67.10%	37	1.35%	-976	-35.56%	2,745	-3.30%
Chino	San Bernardino	8,607	44.00%	10,754	54.98%	200	1.02%	-2,147	-10.98%	19,561	-11.77%
Chino Hills	San Bernardino	10,370	39.81%	15,450	59.31%	228	0.88%	-5,080	-19.50%	26,048	-8.28%
Colton	San Bernardino	6,771	60.94%	4,199	37.79%	141	1.27%	2,572	23.15%	11,111	-13.50%
Fontana	San Bernardino	18,033	56.47%	13,644	42.73%	254	0.80%	4,389	13.75%	31,931	-12.92%
Grand Terrace	San Bernardino	1,923	41.88%	2,623	57.12%	46	1.00%	-700	-15.24%	4,592	-7.57%
Hesperia	San Bernardino	6,728	31.56%	14,359	67.35%	233	1.09%	-7,631	-35.79%	21,320	-14.14%
Highland	San Bernardino	6,124	44.45%	7,515	54.55%	138	1.00%	-1,391	-10.10%	13,777	-13.52%
Loma Linda	San Bernardino	2,655	41.80%	3,616	56.94%	80	1.26%	-961	-15.13%	6,351	-4.99%
Montclair	San Bernardino	4,239	55.71%	3,277	43.07%	93	1.22%	962	12.64%	7,609	-11.47%
Needles	San Bernardino	630	45.59%	734	53.11%	18	1.30%	-104	-7.53%	1,382	-21.24%
Ontario	San Bernardino	18,610	52.00%	16,785	46.90%	392	1.10%	1,825	5.10%	35,787	-8.72%
Rancho Cucamonga	San Bernardino	21,050	39.68%	31,550	59.47%	454	0.86%	-10,500	-19.79%	53,054	-9.14%
Redlands	San Bernardino	11,522	41.62%	15,881	57.36%	283	1.02%	-4,359	-15.74%	27,686	-4.87%
Rialto	San Bernardino	12,922	62.34%	7,574	36.54%	232	1.12%	5,348	25.80%	20,728	-12.02%
San Bernardino	San Bernardino	23,902	56.21%	18,116	42.61%	502	1.18%	5,786	13.61%	42,520	-10.87%
Twentynine Palms	San Bernardino	1,266	32.23%	2,607	66.37%	55	1.40%	-1,341	-34.14%	3,928	-10.18%
Upland	San Bernardino	11,148	41.18%	15,650	57.80%	276	1.02%	-4,502	-16.63%	27,074	-3.54%
Victorville	San Bernardino	8,505	40.40%	12,303	58.44%	245	1.16%	-3,798	-18.04%	21,053	-11.65%
Yucaipa	San Bernardino	5,903	32.69%	11,967	66.27%	188	1.04%	-6,064	-33.58%	18,058	-12.50%
Yucca Valley	San Bernardino	2,336	33.25%	4,622	65.79%	67	0.95%	-2,286	-32.54%	7,025	-9.93%
Unincorporated Area	San Bernardino	32,777	37.50%	53,460	61.16%	1,166	1.33%	-20,683	-23.66%	87,403	-9.68%
Carlsbad	San Diego	20,122	42.30%	27,006	56.77%	442	0.93%	-6,884	-14.47%	47,570	0.10%
Chula Vista	San Diego	33,725	49.03%	34,524	50.19%	539	0.78%	-799	-1.16%	68,788	-7.07%
Coronado	San Diego	3,326	36.26%	5,773	62.93%	74	0.81%	-2,447	-26.68%	9,173	4.59%
Del Mar	San Diego	1,593	56.71%	1,181	42.04%	35	1.25%	412	14.67%	2,809	9.09%
El Cajon	San Diego	11,500	37.62%	18,800	61.51%	265	0.87%	-7,300	-23.88%	30,565	-8.23%
Encinitas	San Diego	17,177	54.54%	13,958	44.32%	358	1.14%	3,219	10.22%	31,493	7.34%
Escondido	San Diego	14,794	35.65%	26,312	63.40%	393	0.95%	-11,518	-27.75%	41,499	-4.47%
Imperial Beach	San Diego	3,531	48.84%	3,599	49.78%	100	1.38%	-68	-0.94%	7,230	-5.52%
La Mesa	San Diego	12,344	48.26%	12,967	50.70%	267	1.04%	-623	-2.44%	25,578	-1.41%
Lemon Grove	San Diego	4,573	49.87%	4,492	48.99%	104	1.13%	81	0.88%	9,169	-5.66%
National City	San Diego	6,313	58.36%	4,388	40.56%	117	1.08%	1,925	17.79%	10,818	-13.99%
Oceanside	San Diego	25,741	42.44%	34,280	56.51%	638	1.05%	-8,539	-14.08%	60,659	-3.70%
Poway	San Diego	7,959	33.39%	15,676	65.76%	205	0.86%	-7,717	-32.37%	23,840	-6.01%
San Diego	San Diego	270,746	55.06%	215,904	43.91%	5,071	1.03%	54,842	11.15%	491,721	0.42%
San Marcos	San Diego	9,489	39.13%	14,568	60.08%	192	0.79%	-5,079	-20.95%	24,249	-4.01%
Santee	San Diego	7,595	32.32%	15,674	66.70%	229	0.97%	-8,079	-34.38%	23,498	-13.05%
Solana Beach	San Diego	3,626	49.64%	3,611	49.43%	68	0.93%	15	0.21%	7,305	7.68%
Vista	San Diego	10,456	39.01%	16,080	60.00%	264	0.99%	-5,624	-20.99%	26,800	-3.00%
Unincorporated Area	San Diego	61,827	32.40%	127,240	66.68%	1,753	0.92%	-65,413	-34.28%	190,820	-5.51%
San Francisco	San Francisco	296,772	83.38%	54,355	15.27%	4,802	1.35%	242,417	68.11%	355,929	8.67%
Escalon	San Joaquin	825	30.74%	1,838	68.48%	21	0.78%	-1,013	-37.74%	2,684	-19.03%
Lathrop	San Joaquin	1,602	53.81%	1,344	45.15%	31	1.04%	258	8.67%	2,977	-6.83%
Lodi	San Joaquin	7,093	33.00%	14,217	66.15%	183	0.85%	-7,124	-33.15%	21,493	-7.27%
Manteca	San Joaquin	7,904	42.78%	10,414	56.37%	158	0.86%	-2,510	-13.59%	18,476	-5.88%
Ripon	San Joaquin	1,264	23.84%	4,018	75.77%	21	0.40%	-2,754	-51.93%	5,303	-7.74%
Stockton	San Joaquin	40,367	56.15%	30,990	43.10%	538	0.75%	9,377	13.04%	71,895	-5.17%
Tracy	San Joaquin	11,457	50.65%	10,976	48.53%	185	0.82%	481	2.13%	22,618	-3.21%
Unincorporated Area	San Joaquin	16,500	37.45%	27,181	61.69%	378	0.86%	-10,681	-24.24%	44,059	-8.55%
Arroyo Grande	San Luis Obispo	3,888	42.01%	5,251	56.74%	115	1.24%	-1,363	-14.73%	9,254	0.97%
Atascadero	San Luis Obispo	5,309	39.66%	7,834	58.52%	244	1.82%	-2,525	-18.86%	13,387	3.34%
El Paso de Robles	San Luis Obispo	4,001	35.63%	7,108	63.31%	119	1.06%	-3,107	-27.67%	11,228	-1.75%
Grover Beach	San Luis Obispo	2,604	47.96%	2,729	50.27%	96	1.77%	-125	-2.30%	5,429	0.96%
Morro Bay	San Luis Obispo	3,305	54.91%	2,608	43.33%	106	1.76%	697	11.58%	6,019	6.88%
Pismo Beach	San Luis Obispo	2,336	46.37%	2,643	52.46%	59	1.17%	-307	-6.09%	5,038	6.14%
San Luis Obispo	San Luis Obispo	14,250	59.28%	9,344	38.87%	445	1.85%	4,906	20.41%	24,039	10.57%
Unincorporated Area	San Luis Obispo	23,049	42.48%	30,478	56.18%	726	1.34%	-7,429	-13.69%	54,253	2.95%
Atherton	San Mateo	2,080	48.27%	2,178	50.55%	51	1.18%	-98	-2.27%	4,309	17.35%
Belmont	San Mateo	8,621	69.60%	3,619	29.22%	147	1.19%	5,002	40.38%	12,387	9.05%
Brisbane	San Mateo	1,535	79.33%	374	19.33%	26	1.34%	1,161	60.00%	1,935	11.76%
Burlingame	San Mateo	8,893	67.13%	4,222	31.87%	133	1.00%	4,671	35.26%	13,248	8.77%
Colma	San Mateo	365	78.49%	95	20.43%	5	1.08%	270	58.06%	465	4.64%
Daly City	San Mateo	21,017	75.25%	6,736	24.12%	178	0.64%	14,281	51.13%	27,931	-0.50%
East Palo Alto	San Mateo	4,690	88.66%	550	10.40%	50	0.95%	4,140	78.26%	5,290	-3.22%
Foster City	San Mateo	8,480	66.98%	4,085	32.26%	96	0.76%	4,395	34.71%	12,661	6.97%
Half Moon Bay	San Mateo	3,570	65.41%	1,823	33.40%	65	1.19%	1,747	32.01%	5,458	8.23%
Hillsborough	San Mateo	2,796	47.33%	3,070	51.96%	42	0.71%	-274	-4.64%	5,908	12.22%
Menlo Park	San Mateo	10,864	71.31%	4,201	27.58%	169	1.11%	6,663	43.74%	15,234	13.83%
Millbrae	San Mateo	5,711	64.28%	3,100	34.89%	74	0.83%	2,611	29.39%	8,885	5.45%
Pacifica	San Mateo	13,409	73.50%	4,626	25.36%	208	1.14%	8,783	48.14%	18,243	4.80%
Portola Valley	San Mateo	1,819	62.64%	1,034	35.61%	51	1.76%	785	27.03%	2,904	16.02%
Redwood City	San Mateo	19,815	68.56%	8,776	30.37%	309	1.07%	11,039	38.20%	28,900	6.41%
San Bruno	San Mateo	10,751	71.85%	4,076	27.24%	137	0.92%	6,675	44.61%	14,964	5.03%
San Carlos	San Mateo	10,335	66.52%	5,048	32.49%	154	0.99%	5,287	34.03%	15,537	8.38%
San Mateo	San Mateo	26,573	69.08%	11,535	29.99%	357	0.93%	15,038	39.10%	38,465	6.91%
South San Francisco	San Mateo	15,035	73.85%	5,154	25.31%	171	0.84%	9,881	48.53%	20,360	1.13%
Woodside	San Mateo	1,868	55.91%	1,438	43.04%	35	1.05%	430	12.87%	3,341	18.28%
Unincorporated Area	San Mateo	19,695	71.22%	7,575	27.39%	382	1.38%	12,120	43.83%	27,652	9.57%
Buellton	Santa Barbara	852	40.75%	1,211	57.91%	28	1.34%	-359	-17.17%	2,091	-4.06%
Carpinteria	Santa Barbara	3,392	59.36%	2,252	39.41%	70	1.23%	1,140	19.95%	5,714	8.37%
Goleta	Santa Barbara	8,170	58.51%	5,562	39.83%	231	1.65%	2,608	18.68%	13,963	N/A (Note: City not incorporated until 2002.)
Guadalupe	Santa Barbara	863	59.81%	567	39.29%	13	0.90%	296	20.51%	1,443	-17.48%
Lompoc	Santa Barbara	4,986	41.76%	6,840	57.29%	113	0.95%	-1,854	-15.53%	11,939	-5.08%
Santa Barbara	Santa Barbara	28,512	69.53%	11,912	29.05%	583	1.42%	16,600	40.48%	41,007	14.31%
Santa Maria	Santa Barbara	8,831	41.27%	12,404	57.97%	162	0.76%	-3,573	-16.70%	21,397	-3.19%
Solvang	Santa Barbara	1,073	39.25%	1,641	60.02%	20	0.73%	-568	-20.78%	2,734	10.40%
Unincorporated Area	Santa Barbara	33,635	48.79%	34,417	49.93%	885	1.28%	-782	-1.13%	68,937	4.46%
Campbell	Santa Clara	9,787	63.00%	5,513	35.49%	236	1.52%	4,274	27.51%	15,536	3.14%
Cupertino	Santa Clara	13,732	65.42%	6,999	33.34%	259	1.23%	6,733	32.08%	20,990	12.26%
Gilroy	Santa Clara	8,188	60.18%	5,273	38.75%	145	1.07%	2,915	21.42%	13,606	-1.45%
Los Altos	Santa Clara	10,196	62.01%	6,035	36.70%	212	1.29%	4,161	25.31%	16,443	13.95%
Los Altos Hills	Santa Clara	2,674	55.33%	2,089	43.22%	70	1.45%	585	12.10%	4,833	16.84%
Los Gatos	Santa Clara	9,244	59.50%	6,090	39.20%	202	1.30%	3,154	20.30%	15,536	6.41%
Milpitas	Santa Clara	11,228	60.99%	6,989	37.96%	194	1.05%	4,239	23.02%	18,411	-2.38%
Monte Sereno	Santa Clara	1,054	52.36%	939	46.65%	20	0.99%	115	5.71%	2,013	10.95%
Morgan Hill	Santa Clara	7,339	53.40%	6,255	45.51%	149	1.08%	1,084	7.89%	13,743	0.32%
Mountain View	Santa Clara	20,275	73.05%	7,030	25.33%	451	1.62%	13,245	47.72%	27,756	8.44%
Palo Alto	Santa Clara	24,912	77.71%	6,721	20.97%	425	1.33%	18,191	56.74%	32,058	10.09%
San Jose	Santa Clara	181,589	63.26%	102,299	35.64%	3,186	1.11%	79,290	27.62%	287,074	-0.55%
Santa Clara	Santa Clara	23,255	66.32%	11,296	32.22%	513	1.46%	11,959	34.11%	35,064	4.07%
Saratoga	Santa Clara	8,886	55.18%	7,054	43.80%	165	1.02%	1,832	11.38%	16,105	14.11%
Sunnyvale	Santa Clara	30,063	66.93%	14,150	31.50%	702	1.56%	15,913	35.43%	44,915	7.35%
Unincorporated Area	Santa Clara	23,678	61.45%	14,362	37.27%	491	1.27%	9,316	24.18%	38,531	2.18%
Capitola	Santa Cruz	3,757	73.11%	1,292	25.14%	90	1.75%	2,465	47.97%	5,139	12.37%
Santa Cruz	Santa Cruz	26,623	83.68%	4,497	14.13%	695	2.18%	22,126	69.55%	31,815	19.53%
Scotts Valley	Santa Cruz	3,532	57.23%	2,554	41.38%	86	1.39%	978	15.85%	6,172	9.97%
Watsonville	Santa Cruz	7,413	72.71%	2,665	26.14%	117	1.15%	4,748	46.57%	10,195	2.18%
Unincorporated Area	Santa Cruz	47,777	69.84%	19,346	28.28%	1,289	1.88%	28,431	41.56%	68,412	13.72%
Anderson	Shasta	1,099	36.46%	1,883	62.48%	32	1.06%	-784	-26.01%	3,014	-1.55%
Redding	Shasta	12,220	32.49%	24,936	66.30%	453	1.20%	-12,716	-33.81%	37,609	-0.40%
Shasta Lake	Shasta	1,399	36.31%	2,392	62.08%	62	1.61%	-993	-25.77%	3,853	-7.62%
Unincorporated Area	Shasta	9,621	29.07%	23,038	69.61%	436	1.32%	-13,417	-40.54%	33,095	-1.60%
Loyalton	Sierra	110	29.65%	256	69.00%	5	1.35%	-146	-39.35%	371	-5.45%
Unincorporated Area	Sierra	536	34.05%	993	63.09%	45	2.86%	-457	-29.03%	1,574	5.47%
Dorris	Siskiyou	74	25.61%	211	73.01%	4	1.38%	-137	-47.40%	289	-1.73%
Dunsmuir	Siskiyou	486	58.13%	339	40.55%	11	1.32%	147	17.58%	836	13.25%
Etna	Siskiyou	110	29.33%	262	69.87%	3	0.80%	-152	-40.53%	375	8.90%
Fort Jones	Siskiyou	84	27.81%	212	70.20%	6	1.99%	-128	-42.38%	302	2.62%
Montague	Siskiyou	114	21.51%	409	77.17%	7	1.32%	-295	-55.66%	530	-3.98%
Mt. Shasta	Siskiyou	1,018	57.29%	719	40.46%	40	2.25%	299	16.83%	1,777	13.40%
Tulelake	Siskiyou	66	25.88%	181	70.98%	8	3.14%	-115	-45.10%	255	14.52%
Weed	Siskiyou	575	55.66%	446	43.18%	12	1.16%	129	12.49%	1,033	1.33%
Yreka	Siskiyou	1,072	32.22%	2,209	66.40%	46	1.38%	-1,137	-34.17%	3,327	1.21%
Unincorporated Area	Siskiyou	4,281	35.27%	7,685	63.31%	173	1.43%	-3,404	-28.04%	12,139	7.48%
Benicia	Solano	8,426	60.56%	5,330	38.31%	158	1.14%	3,096	22.25%	13,914	2.07%
Dixon	Solano	2,820	44.63%	3,441	54.45%	58	0.92%	-621	-9.83%	6,319	-5.31%
Fairfield	Solano	18,788	55.23%	14,913	43.84%	314	0.92%	3,875	11.39%	34,015	-1.45%
Rio Vista	Solano	1,537	46.79%	1,718	52.30%	30	0.91%	-181	-5.51%	3,285	-0.37%
Suisun City	Solano	5,590	61.91%	3,362	37.24%	77	0.85%	2,228	24.68%	9,029	-0.52%
Vacaville	Solano	15,564	46.38%	17,696	52.73%	297	0.89%	-2,132	-6.35%	33,557	-5.60%
Vallejo	Solano	28,913	72.18%	10,827	27.03%	315	0.79%	18,086	45.15%	40,055	-0.74%
Unincorporated Area	Solano	3,458	40.34%	5,014	58.49%	100	1.17%	-1,556	-18.15%	8,572	-4.80%
Cloverdale	Sonoma	2,144	61.49%	1,303	37.37%	40	1.15%	841	24.12%	3,487	3.66%
Cotati	Sonoma	2,551	72.37%	904	25.65%	70	1.99%	1,647	46.72%	3,525	8.43%
Healdsburg	Sonoma	3,646	67.59%	1,685	31.24%	63	1.17%	1,961	36.36%	5,394	10.46%
Petaluma	Sonoma	18,016	67.85%	8,130	30.62%	407	1.53%	9,886	37.23%	26,553	6.69%
Rohnert Park	Sonoma	11,125	65.33%	5,637	33.10%	266	1.56%	5,488	32.23%	17,028	5.81%
Santa Rosa	Sonoma	46,441	67.52%	21,281	30.94%	1,057	1.54%	25,160	36.58%	68,779	9.93%
Sebastopol	Sonoma	3,395	79.32%	799	18.67%	86	2.01%	2,596	60.65%	4,280	15.94%
Sonoma	Sonoma	3,952	69.09%	1,689	29.53%	79	1.38%	2,263	39.56%	5,720	9.99%
Windsor	Sonoma	6,372	58.31%	4,405	40.31%	150	1.37%	1,967	18.00%	10,927	0.96%
Unincorporated Area	Sonoma	50,619	68.05%	22,371	30.08%	1,394	1.87%	28,248	37.98%	74,384	10.90%
Ceres	Stanislaus	4,616	44.49%	5,660	54.55%	99	0.95%	-1,044	-10.06%	10,375	-12.01%
Hughson	Stanislaus	625	31.77%	1,323	67.26%	19	0.97%	-698	-35.49%	1,967	-20.94%
Modesto	Stanislaus	27,962	43.33%	35,986	55.76%	590	0.91%	-8,024	-12.43%	64,538	-9.61%
Newman	Stanislaus	924	47.14%	1,013	51.68%	23	1.17%	-89	-4.54%	1,960	-9.46%
Oakdale	Stanislaus	2,030	33.91%	3,894	65.04%	63	1.05%	-1,864	-31.13%	5,987	-14.02%
Patterson	Stanislaus	1,829	53.22%	1,586	46.14%	22	0.64%	243	7.07%	3,437	-2.43%
Riverbank	Stanislaus	2,029	41.25%	2,854	58.02%	36	0.73%	-825	-16.77%	4,919	-13.39%
Turlock	Stanislaus	7,395	38.12%	11,849	61.09%	153	0.79%	-4,454	-22.96%	19,397	-9.09%
Waterford	Stanislaus	632	32.02%	1,319	66.82%	23	1.17%	-687	-34.80%	1,974	-15.85%
Unincorporated Area	Stanislaus	10,787	34.84%	19,923	64.35%	250	0.81%	-9,136	-29.51%	30,960	-9.54%
Live Oak	Sutter	815	47.72%	871	51.00%	22	1.29%	-56	-3.28%	1,708	-7.38%
Yuba City	Sutter	6,393	34.23%	12,108	64.82%	178	0.95%	-5,715	-30.60%	18,679	-2.02%
Unincorporated Area	Sutter	2,394	24.53%	7,275	74.55%	89	0.91%	-4,881	-50.02%	9,758	-9.45%
Corning	Tehama	677	36.85%	1,131	61.57%	29	1.58%	-454	-24.71%	1,837	-2.18%
Red Bluff	Tehama	1,706	38.46%	2,663	60.03%	67	1.51%	-957	-21.57%	4,436	-1.33%
Tehama	Tehama	65	32.99%	130	65.99%	2	1.02%	-65	-32.99%	197	-10.48%
Unincorporated Area	Tehama	5,056	29.86%	11,648	68.78%	231	1.36%	-6,592	-38.93%	16,935	-2.01%
Unincorporated Area	Trinity	2,782	42.94%	3,560	54.95%	137	2.11%	-778	-12.01%	6,479	12.28%
Dinuba	Tulare	1,512	43.80%	1,912	55.39%	28	0.81%	-400	-11.59%	3,452	-10.93%
Exeter	Tulare	824	28.34%	2,060	70.84%	24	0.83%	-1,236	-42.50%	2,908	-11.65%
Farmersville	Tulare	719	47.65%	777	51.49%	13	0.86%	-58	-3.84%	1,509	-22.43%
Lindsay	Tulare	690	49.29%	699	49.93%	11	0.79%	-9	-0.64%	1,400	-11.69%
Porterville	Tulare	3,358	35.83%	5,925	63.23%	88	0.94%	-2,567	-27.39%	9,371	-11.71%
Tulare	Tulare	3,869	34.04%	7,420	65.29%	76	0.67%	-3,551	-31.25%	11,365	-16.06%
Visalia	Tulare	10,855	31.39%	23,450	67.82%	274	0.79%	-12,595	-36.42%	34,579	-6.19%
Woodlake	Tulare	537	54.52%	433	43.96%	15	1.52%	104	10.56%	985	-15.45%
Unincorporated Area	Tulare	10,130	30.54%	22,723	68.50%	317	0.96%	-12,593	-37.97%	33,170	-9.67%
Sonora	Tuolumne	970	48.67%	1,003	50.33%	20	1.00%	-33	-1.66%	1,993	-2.23%
Unincorporated Area	Tuolumne	9,134	37.75%	14,742	60.93%	319	1.32%	-5,608	-23.18%	24,195	-5.78%
Camarillo	Ventura	12,590	41.29%	17,555	57.57%	349	1.14%	-4,965	-16.28%	30,494	-3.31%
Fillmore	Ventura	2,227	50.04%	2,177	48.92%	46	1.03%	50	1.12%	4,450	-10.97%
Moorpark	Ventura	5,731	41.64%	7,900	57.40%	133	0.97%	-2,169	-15.76%	13,764	-4.68%
Ojai	Ventura	2,452	60.83%	1,533	38.03%	46	1.14%	919	22.80%	4,031	10.58%
Oxnard	Ventura	26,551	60.84%	16,633	38.11%	459	1.05%	9,918	22.73%	43,643	-5.66%
Port Hueneme	Ventura	3,480	54.47%	2,820	44.14%	89	1.39%	660	10.33%	6,389	-3.16%
San Buenaventura	Ventura	25,356	52.57%	22,150	45.92%	725	1.50%	3,206	6.65%	48,231	3.30%
Santa Paula	Ventura	4,585	57.64%	3,249	40.85%	120	1.51%	1,336	16.80%	7,954	-6.80%
Simi Valley	Ventura	19,407	38.09%	30,942	60.73%	602	1.18%	-11,535	-22.64%	50,951	-7.75%
Thousand Oaks	Ventura	26,892	43.68%	34,063	55.33%	611	0.99%	-7,171	-11.65%	61,566	-0.80%
Unincorporated Area	Ventura	19,588	47.27%	21,292	51.39%	556	1.34%	-1,704	-4.11%	41,436	0.74%
Davis	Yolo	22,742	74.16%	7,386	24.08%	539	1.76%	15,356	50.07%	30,667	11.79%
West Sacramento	Yolo	6,792	53.41%	5,736	45.10%	189	1.49%	1,056	8.30%	12,717	-11.83%
Winters	Yolo	1,231	51.02%	1,147	47.53%	35	1.45%	84	3.48%	2,413	-1.04%
Woodland	Yolo	8,367	46.49%	9,407	52.27%	222	1.23%	-1,040	-5.78%	17,996	-1.20%
Unincorporated Area	Yolo	3,753	45.68%	4,329	52.69%	134	1.63%	-576	-7.01%	8,216	4.32%
Marysville	Yuba	1,276	35.34%	2,284	63.25%	51	1.41%	-1,008	-27.91%	3,611	-7.09%
Wheatland	Yuba	321	29.42%	757	69.39%	13	1.19%	-436	-39.96%	1,091	-22.91%
Unincorporated Area	Yuba	4,090	30.71%	9,035	67.84%	193	1.45%	-4,945	-37.13%	13,318	-8.20%
Totals (Note: Statewide candidate vote percentages and the total vote number differ here because California's Supplement to Statement of Vote does not count write in votes as part of the city totals.)		6,745,290	54.40%	5,509,777	44.43%	145,186	1.17%	1,235,513	9.96%	12,400,253	-1.84%

==== Cities & Unincorporated Areas that flipped from Democratic to Republican ====
- Brentwood (Contra Costa)
- Fowler (Fresno)
- Kerman (Fresno)
- Selma (Fresno)
- Wasco (Kern)
- Corcoran (Kings)
- Covina (Los Angeles)
- Diamond Bar (Los Angeles)
- Hidden Hills (Los Angeles)
- Lakewood (Los Angeles)
- Palmdale (Los Angeles)
- Whittier (Los Angeles)
- Gustine (Merced)
- Stanton (Orange)
- Blythe (Riverside)
- Riverside (Riverside)
- Adelanto (San Bernardino)
- Barstow (San Bernardino)
- Chino (San Bernardino)
- Highland (San Bernardino)
- Needles (San Bernardino)
- Chula Vista (San Diego)
- Imperial Beach (San Diego)
- Ceres (Stanislaus)
- Newman (Stanislaus)
- Live Oak (Sutter)
- Farmersville (Tulare)
- Lindsay (Tulare)
- Sonora (Tuolumne)

==== Cities & Unincorporated Areas that flipped from Republican to Democratic ====
- Livermore (Alameda)
- Pleasanton (Alameda)
- Unincorporated Area of Alpine
- Chico (Butte)
- Moraga (Contra Costa)
- San Ramon (Contra Costa)
- Unincorporated Area of Humboldt
- Lakeport (Lake)
- Sierra Madre (Los Angeles)
- Belvedere (Marin)
- Mammoth Lakes (Mono)
- Unincorporated Area of Napa
- Solana Beach (San Diego)
- Woodside (San Mateo)
- Los Altos Hills (Santa Clara)
- Monte Sereno (Santa Clara)
- Saratoga (Santa Clara)

==== City that flipped from Republican to Tied ====
- Holtville (Los Angeles)

== Electors ==
Technically, the voters of California cast their ballots for electors: representatives to the Electoral College. California is allocated 55 electors because it has 53 congressional districts and 2 senators. All candidates who appear on the ballot or qualify to receive write-in votes must submit a list of 53 electors who pledge to vote for their candidate and his or her running mate. Whoever wins the majority of votes in the state is awarded all 53 electoral votes. Their chosen electors then vote for president and vice president. Although electors are pledged to their candidate and running mate, they are not obligated to vote for them. An elector who votes for someone other than his or her candidate is known as a faithless elector.

The electors of each state and the District of Columbia met on December 13, 2004, to cast their votes for president and vice president. The Electoral College itself never meets as one body. Instead, the electors from each state and the District of Columbia met in their respective capitols.

The following were the members of the Electoral College from California. All were pledged to and voted for John Kerry and John Edwards.

1. Robert H. Manley
2. Barbara Schraeger
3. Paul Johnson
4. Gary Simmons
5. Paul Batterson
6. Diana Madoshi
7. Kyriakos Tsakopoulos
8. Donald Linker
9. Paula Sandusky
10. Adam Woo
11. Chloe Drew
12. Karl Sliferv
13. Gary Prost
14. Joseph Cotchett
15. John Smith
16. George Marcus
17. Mark Hsu
18. Adele Bihn
19. Darrell Darling
20. Amarjit Dhaliwal
21. Rocco Davis
22. Kenneth Costa
23. Barbara Pyle
24. David Johnson
25. Andrew M. Siegel
26. Michael Carpenter
27. Lynda Von Husen
28. Randy Monroe
29. Lane M. Sherman
30. Moreen Blum
31. Yolanda Dyer
32. Paul I. Goldenberg
33. Lenore Wax
34. Mitch O'Farrell
35. Franklin A. Acevedo
36. Gwen Moore
37. Pedro Carillo
38. Karen Walters
39. Ted Lieu
40. Valerie McDonald
41. Marvin
42. Douglas E. Hitchcock
43. Barbara Kerr
44. Salvador Sanchez
45. Joe Baca Jr.
46. Grant Gruber
47. James T. Ewing
48. Louise Giacoppe
49. James G. Bohm
50. Mark Lam
51. Chuck Lower
52. Susan Koehler
53. Mary Salas
54. Andrew Benjamin
55. Margaret Lawrence
