= Patrick Rodgers Farm =

- Patrick Rodgers Ranch
- U.S. National Register of Historic Places
- U.S. Historic district
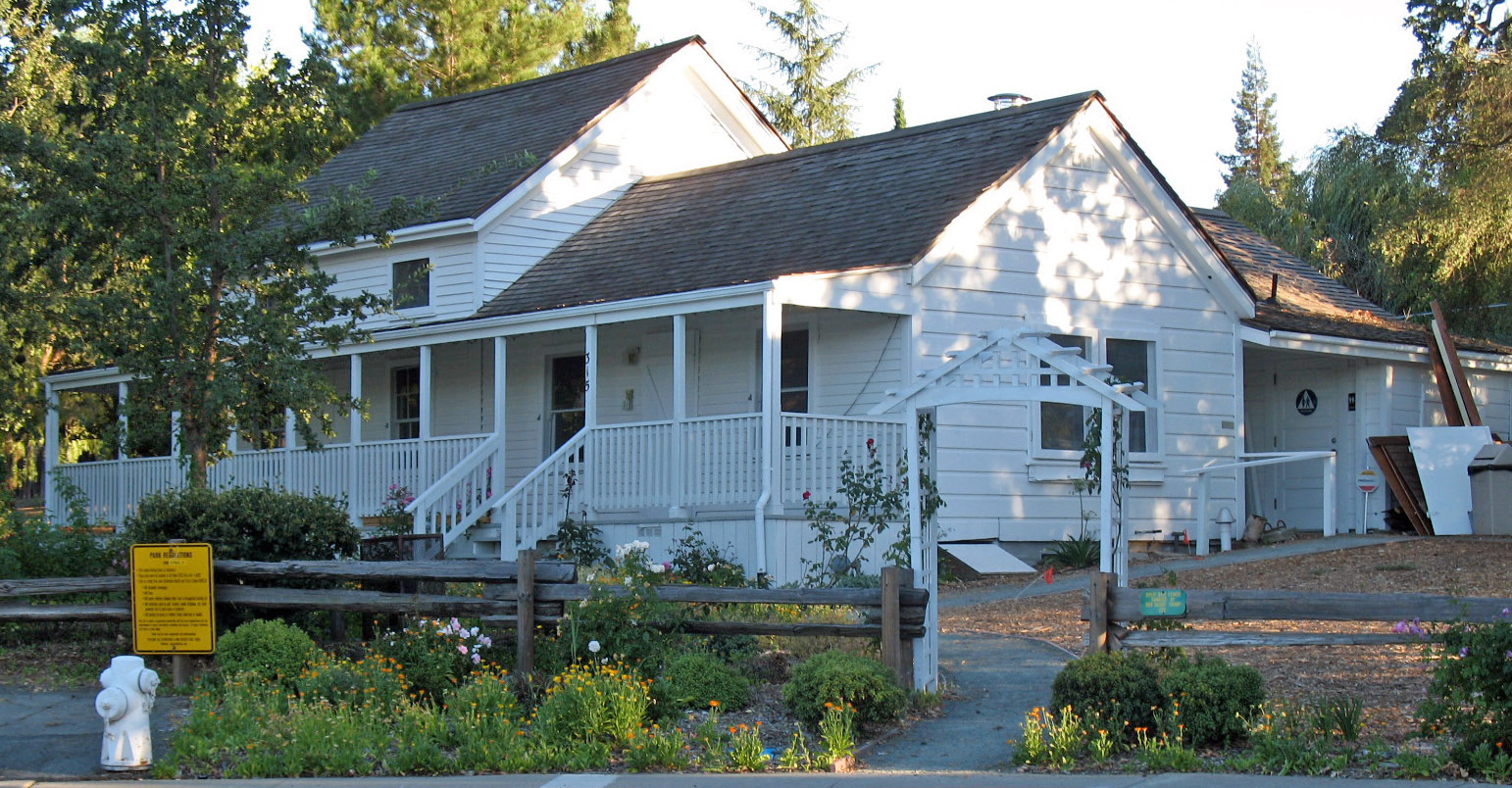

- Location within California Location within the United States
- Location: 315 Cortsen Rd., Pleasant Hill, California
- Coordinates: 37°56′35.04″N 122°5′12.88″W
- Area: 1.7 acres (0.69 ha)
- Architect: Patrick Rodgers
- NRHP reference No.: 91000305
- Added to NRHP: March 22, 1991

The Patrick Rodgers Farm, or Rodgers Ranch, is a historic home and ranch located in Pleasant Hill, California. In 1991, the property was listed on the National Register of Historic Places.

== History ==
In 1868, Patrick Rodgers and his family moved to this area from the Sierra Nevada region to what was then a 149-acre (60 ha) farm. Patrick Rodgers died in 1891 leaving the ranch to his heirs. 16 years later the property was divided among his heirs. Alice and James Rodgers received a 38-acre (15 ha) portion containing the house and barn which were constructed in the 1860s.

In 1915, the ranch was sold to Rollo Hough, a partner in the Luther Burbank Company, to become a demonstration farm, but because of financial difficulties it never came to be. A few years later the property was reduced to 18 acres (7.3 ha) and remained that size until the area was developed. In 1937, author Alice Hobart purchased the property.

In 1942, the ranch was sold to Kaho Daily, who maintained it as a working ranch until 1978. A development for single family homes was approved in 1987. The Pleasant Hill Historical Society stepped in to save what remained of the ranch and the property was added to the National Register of Historic Places in 1991.

== See also ==
- National Register of Historic Places listings in Contra Costa County, California
