= Dinosaur Hill Park =

Park in Pleasant Hill, California, US

Coordinates: 37°56′10″N 122°05′19″W

Dinosaur Hill Park (also known as Dino Hill) is a park in Pleasant Hill, California. Located off Taylor Blvd, the park includes 13 acres (5.3 hectares) of open space, hiking, and scenic views. The elevation is 308 feet. There is a small parking area accessible only by northbound traffic. From here a staircase and railroad tie steps lead to the top of the hill. The park is one of several parks owned and managed by the Pleasant Hill Recreation and Park District. The park offers good views of Mount Diablo and is popular on the 4th of July as several simultaneous (although distant) fireworks displays can be seen. The park offers a panoramic view of Pleasant Hill, Concord, and Walnut Creek and the northern reach of the Diablo Range.

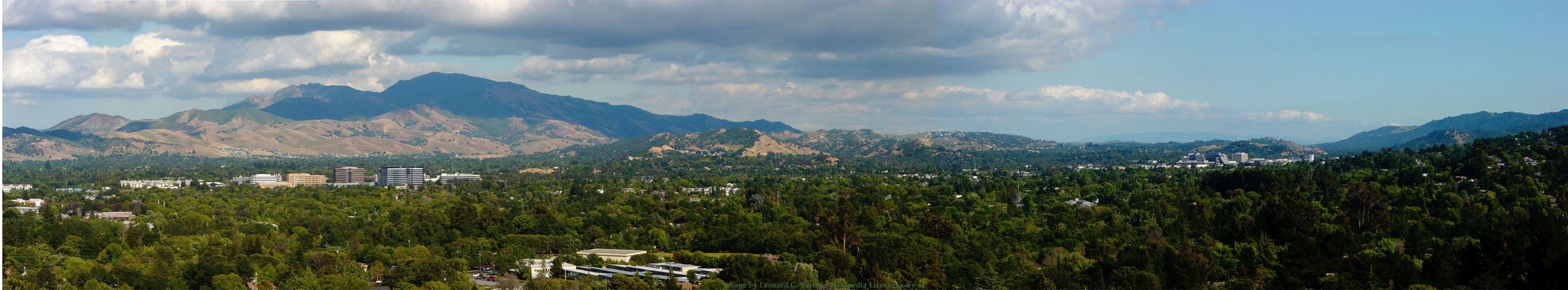
View of Mt. Diablo and part of the Diablo Valley from Dinosaur Hill Park
