= 2004 California Republican presidential primary =

- March 2, 2004

173 Republican National Convention delegates (170 pledged, 3 unpledged) The number of pledged delegates received is determined by the popular vote
Candidate	George W. Bush
Home state	Texas
Delegate count	170
Popular vote	2,216,351
Percentage	99.986%

The 2004 California Republican presidential primary was held on March 2, 2004, the same day as the Democratic primary. As expected, incumbent President George W. Bush won near-unanimously over the disbanded opposition. Bush later won the general election over Senator John Kerry of Massachusetts.

== Results ==
2004 California Republican presidential primary
Candidate	Votes	%	Delegates
George W. Bush (incumbent)	2,216,047	99.986	170
Nancy Warrick (write-in)	95	0.004	0
Bill Wyatt (write-in)	90	0.004	0
Blake Ashby (write-in)	56	0.003	0
Bradley J. Barton (write-in)	22	0.001	0
Richard Allen Holtz (write-in)	17	0.0008	0
Richard P. Bosa (write-in)	12	0.0006	0
Doc Castellano (write-in)	12	0.0006	0
Total	2,216,351	100%	170

== See also ==
- 2004 California Democratic presidential primary
- 2004 Republican Party presidential primaries
- 2004 United States presidential election in California
