= 2004 California Democratic presidential primary =

- March 2, 2004

441 Democratic National Convention delegates (370 pledged, 17 unpledged) The number of pledged delegates received is determined by the popular vote
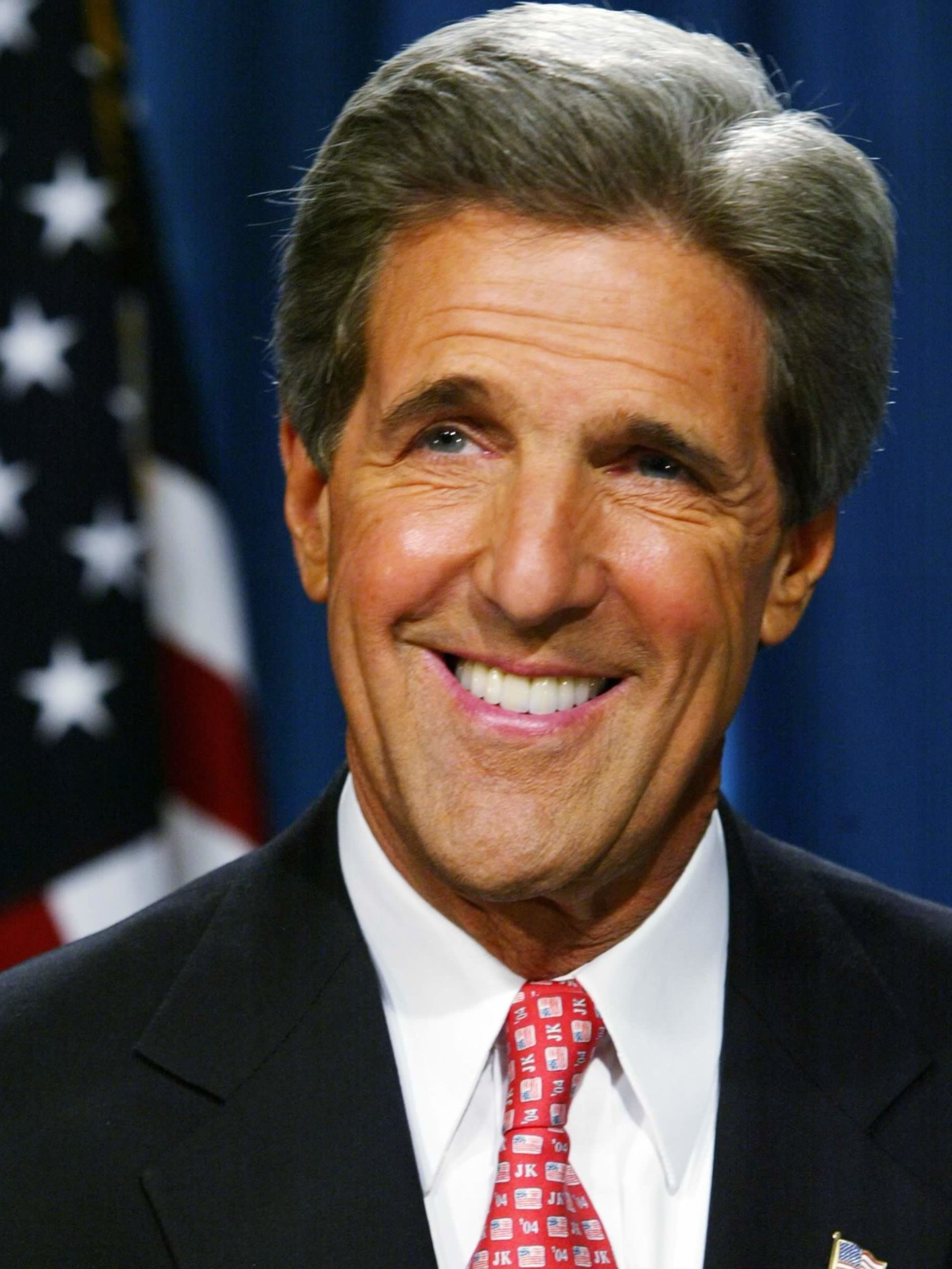

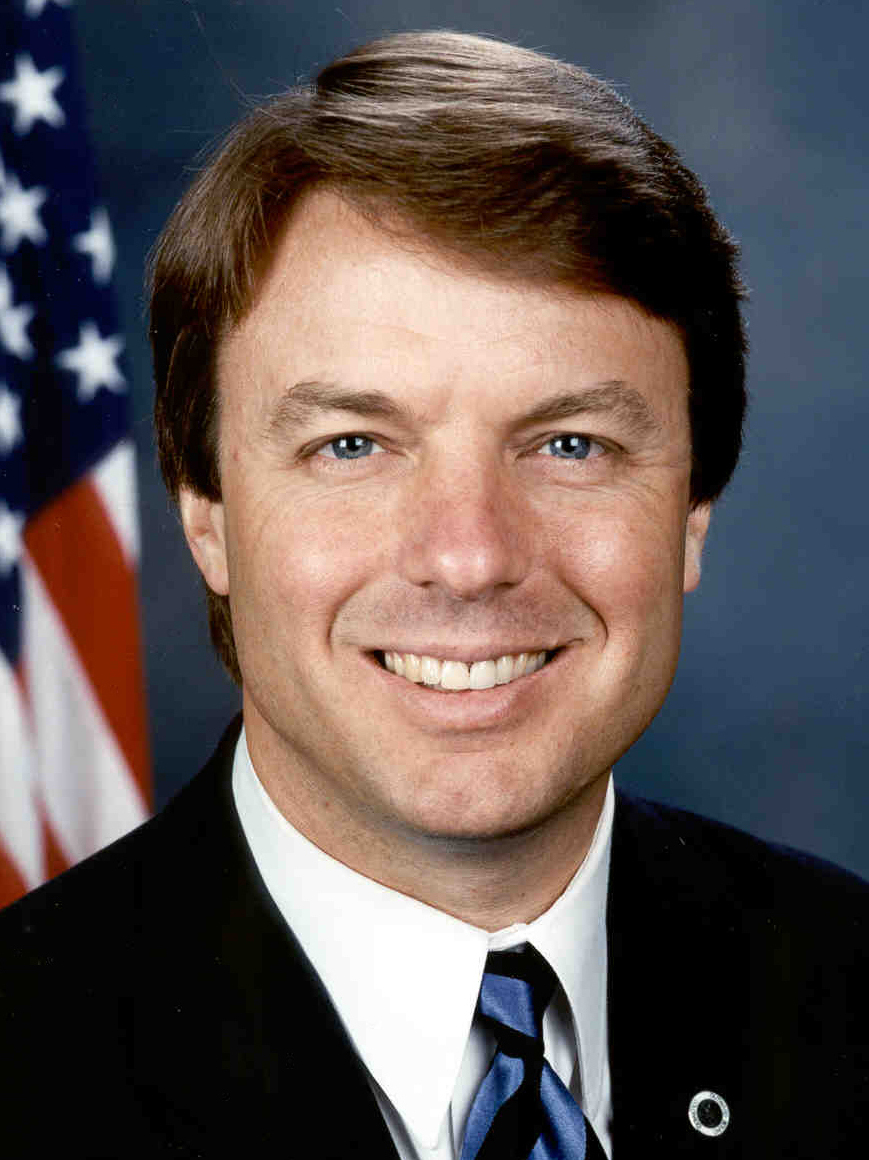

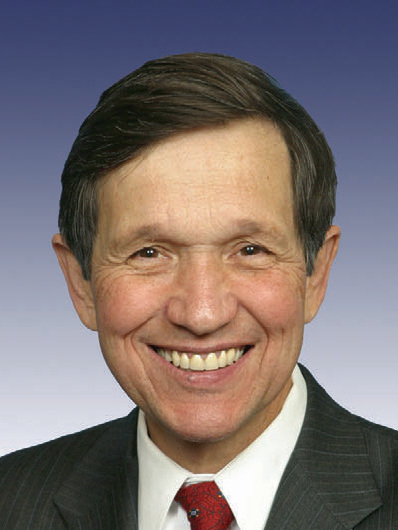

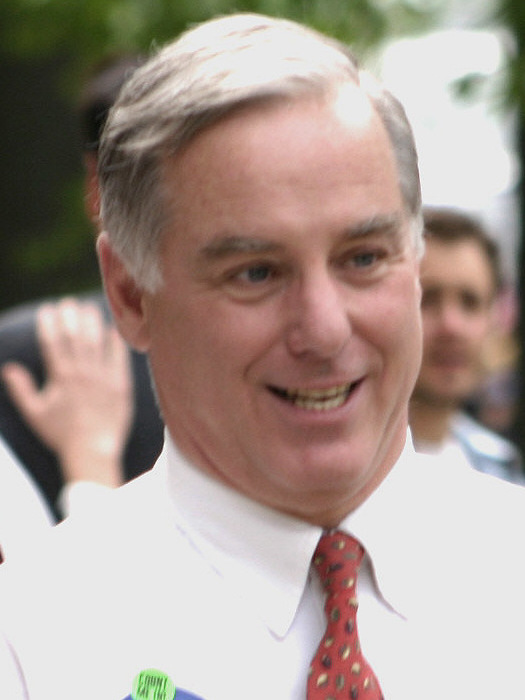
Candidate	John Kerry	John Edwards
Home state	Massachusetts	North Carolina
Delegate count	288	82
Popular vote	2,002,539	614,441
Percentage	64.44%	19.77%
Candidate	Dennis Kucinich	Howard Dean (withdrawn)
Home state	Ohio	Vermont
Delegate count	0	0
Popular vote	144,954	130,892
Percentage	4.66%	4.21%
- Primary results by county Kerry: 50–60% 60–70%

The 2004 California Democratic presidential primary was held on March 2, 2004, the same day as the Republican primary. Senator John Kerry overwhelmingly won the primary over rivals Senator John Edwards, Congressman Dennis Kucinich, and Reverend Al Sharpton. The primary was open to both registered Democrats and unaffiliated voters. 440 delegates were at stake, with 370 tied to the March primary.

== Candidates ==
=== Remaining ===
- Senator John Kerry of Massachusetts
- Senator John Edwards of North Carolina
- Congressman Dennis Kucinich of Ohio
- Reverend Al Sharpton of New York

=== Dropped out ===
- Governor Howard Dean of Vermont dropped out on February 17, 2004.
- NATO Commander Wesley Clark of Arkansas dropped out on February 11, 2004.
- Senator Joe Lieberman of Connecticut dropped out on February 3, 2004.
- Congressman Dick Gephardt of Missouri dropped out on January 20, 2004.
- Senator Carol Moseley Braun of Illinois dropped out on January 15, 2004.

== Campaign ==
With the Wisconsin primary results, which pitted John Kerry and John Edwards in a close fight, and Dean's withdrawal from the race, the campaign moved to Super Tuesday contests. California shared its primary with 9 other states, including New York and Ohio who also placed their primaries on March 2, 2004, or Super Tuesday.

For months Governor Dean had been leading in California, but since his fall and Kerry's rise, polls in California were mixed. However, when Dean exited the race polls showed Kerry with over 2:1 leads over contender John Edwards.

=== John Kerry campaign ===
Following victories in Idaho, Utah and Hawaii, Kerry moved into the Super Tuesday contests swiftly and with major momentum. With polls showing him ahead in big Super Tuesday states such as California, New York, and Ohio, Kerry was positive on big wins in all three.

Kerry campaigned hard in California and didn't take competition from Edwards and Kucinich lightly. The San Francisco Chronicle reported that Senator had spent 5 additional days in the state than any other candidate competing in the state as well as the fact that Kerry has increased State Staffers by 25 and increased Volunteer Numbers by hundreds in mid-February to ensure a sweep through the California Primary.

=== John Edwards campaign ===
John Edwards, having come out with a strong second place showing in Wisconsin (losing to Kerry 40%–34%), claimed significant momentum heading into California and other Super Tuesday nominating contests on the same day.

Edwards, not having as much popularity out west as in the Rust Belt, South, and Mid-West, did not focus on California until his unexpected final surge in Wisconsin, beating one-time California and national front-runner Howard Dean. Edwards sent Elizabeth Edwards out west to help campaign as well as opened Campaign offices across the state in a last-ditch effort for a final surge.

When the Democrats debated on February 26, 2004, in Los Angeles, Edwards hoped to score points by attacking John Kerry like in the New York debate. However, by the time of the debate, Kerry was already ahead of Edwards by 40 points.

== Polling data ==
Polling for 2004 California Democratic presidential primary
Candidate	California Statewide Survey 2/12	Los Angeles Times Poll 2/20	Average
John Kerry	56%	56%	56%
John Edwards	10%	24%	17.5%
Howard Dean	11%	0% (withdrawn)	N/A

=== Exit polling ===
Exit Polling
Classification	% of all	John Kerry	John Edwards	Dennis Kucinich
Male	47%	65%	18%	5%
Female	53%	65%	20%	3%
Democrat	75%	70%	18%	3%
Republican	4%	33%	24%	3%
Independent	21%	53%	23%	6%

== Results ==
Key:	Withdrew prior to contest

2004 California Democratic presidential primary
Candidate	Votes	Percentage	National delegates
John Kerry	2,002,539	64.44%	288
John Edwards	614,441	19.77%	82
Dennis Kucinich	144,954	4.66%	0
Howard Dean	130,892	4.21%	0
Al Sharpton	59,326	1.91%	0
Joe Lieberman	52,780	1.70%	0
Wesley Clark	51,084	1.64%	0
Carol Moseley Braun	24,501	0.79%	0
Dick Gephardt	19,139	0.62%	0
Lyndon LaRouche	7,953	0.26%	0
Katarina Dunmar (write-in)	6	0.00%	0
James Alexander-Pace (write-in)	4	0.00%	0
Bill Pand (write-in)	4	0.00%	0
David Giacomuzzi (write-in)	3	0.00%	0
Fern Penna (write-in)	3	0.00%	0
Totals	3,107,629	100.00%	370

== Analysis ==
On Super Tuesday, Kerry swept all the primaries and eventually won the nomination the next day. He won California by a landslide. He won with nearly 65% of the vote, including every county in the state and every congressional district with over 60% except California's 2nd congressional district. Kerry's only legit opponent left, John Edwards, received under 20% of the vote, insuring his major defeat.

== See also ==
- 2004 California Republican presidential primary
- 2004 Democratic Party presidential primaries
- 2004 United States presidential election in California
