= Pleasant Hill, California =

City in California, United States

- City
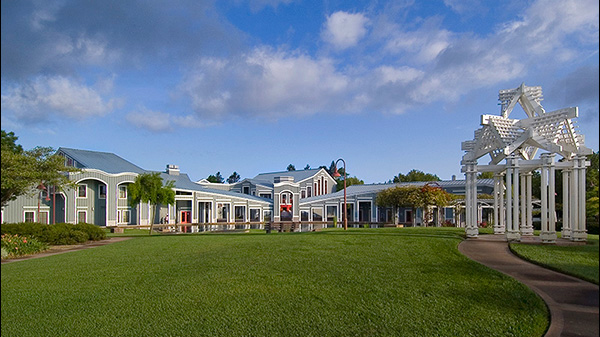
- City Hall

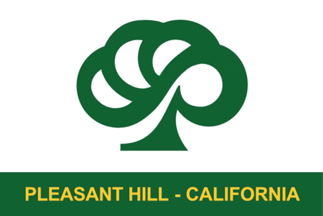
- Flag
- Interactive map of Pleasant Hill, California
- Coordinates: 37°56′53″N 122°03′09″W
- Country: United States
- State: California
- County: Contra Costa
- Incorporated: November 14, 1961

Government
  - City Council: Mayor Zac Shess; Vice Mayor Andrei Obolenskiy; Belle La; Sue Noack; Amanda Szakats
  - City Treasurer: Andrew Kalinowski
  - City Clerk: Lyone Conner
  - State Leg.: Sen. Tim Grayson (D); Asm. Anamarie Avila Farias (D)
  - U. S. Congress: Mark DeSaulnier (D)

Area
  - Total: 7.08 sq mi (18.33 km^{2})
  - Land: 7.07 sq mi (18.32 km^{2})
  - Water: 0 sq mi (0.00 km^{2}) 0%
- Elevation: 52 ft (16 m)

Population (2020)
  - Total: 34,613
  - Density: 4,893/sq mi (1,889/km^{2})
- Time zone: UTC-8 (PST)
  - Summer (DST): UTC-7 (PDT)
- ZIP code: 94523
- Area code: 925
- FIPS code: 06-57764
- GNIS feature IDs: 1659406, 2411439
- Website: Official website

Pleasant Hill is a city in Contra Costa County, California, United States, in the East Bay of the San Francisco Bay Area. The population was 34,613 at the 2020 census. It was incorporated in 1961. Pleasant Hill is the home of College Park High School, Diablo Valley College, the Pleasant Hill Library of the Contra Costa County Library system, and the Pleasant Hill Recreation & Park District.

== History and architecture ==
Before colonization the area was inhabited by members of the Bay Miwok people. The San Ramon Valley Branch Line of the Southern Pacific entered service in 1891 with two flag stops in the area that would become the City of Pleasant Hill: Hookston, located today where the Iron Horse Regional Trail crosses Hookston Road, and Sparkle, where the Southern Pacific and Sacramento Northern Railway intersected and today stands the Pleasant Hill BART station. The area began to be suburbanized in the 1920s following prohibition, as the many local vineyards were removed and the formerly agricultural land was subdivided for housing. Monument Boulevard was named after the Soldiers Memorial Monument to commemorate veterans and war dead of World War I from Contra Costa County. It was erected on December 11, 1927, at the intersection of Monument Boulevard and the Contra Costa Highway, now Contra Costa Boulevard. The monument depicts one black and three white soldiers. It is 45 feet (14 meters) tall, constructed of formed concrete, and weighs 150 tons. In 1954 the monument was moved to its current site at the intersection of Boyd Road and Contra Costa Boulevard to make way for the construction of State Route 21.

Developed largely in the years following World War II, the area did not have a post office until 1948. The city incorporated in 1961.

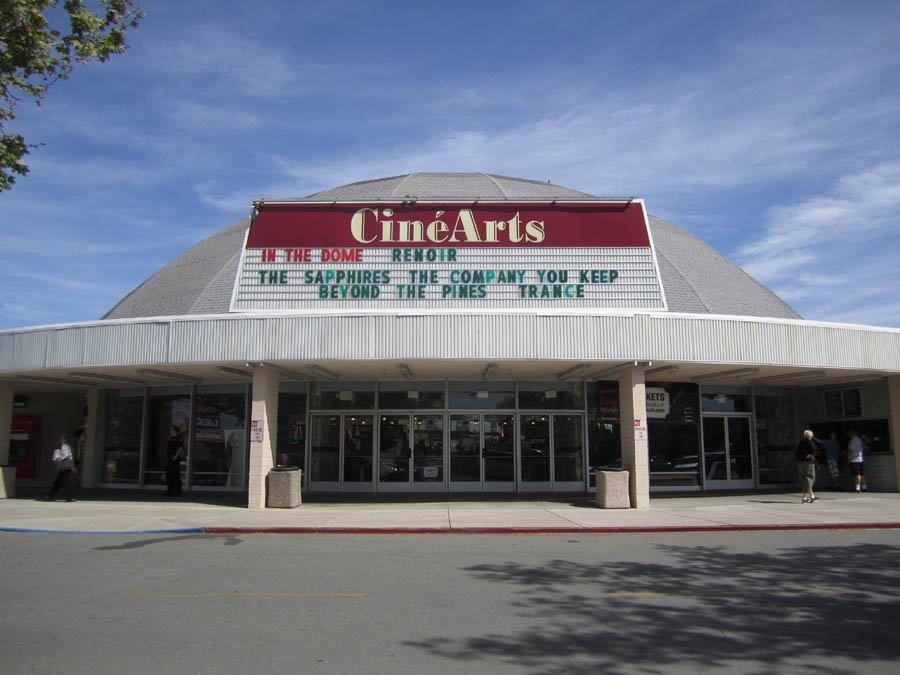
CinéArts "Dome" Theater, 2013

On February 21, 1967, Century 21 Theaters opened an 895-seat dome theater between Monument Boulevard and Hookston Road, just off I-680. The futuristic dome-topped cinema became an iconic landmark for the newly incorporated city. The theater was designed by prolific Bay Area architect Vincent G. Raney. It had a distinctive 50-foot-high domed ceiling and oversized curved screen. The theater was initially built to showcase the Cinerama widescreen process developed in the 1950s. The screen was later updated to standard flat-screen. In 1973, four additional single-screen auditoriums were added to the front of the building. Renamed as Century 5 Theatres, it continued to be known familiarly as the Dome.

The city hall of Pleasant Hill was designed by architect Charles Moore. Completed in the late 20th century, it has won several awards for architectural design.

For most of its history, Pleasant Hill did not have a true downtown or Main Street. In 1991, the city began planning the redevelopment of the area around the intersection of Monument and Contra Costa boulevards. In July 2000, Downtown Pleasant Hill finally opened. The privately owned and operated outdoor shopping center was designed to resemble a typical small Main Street.

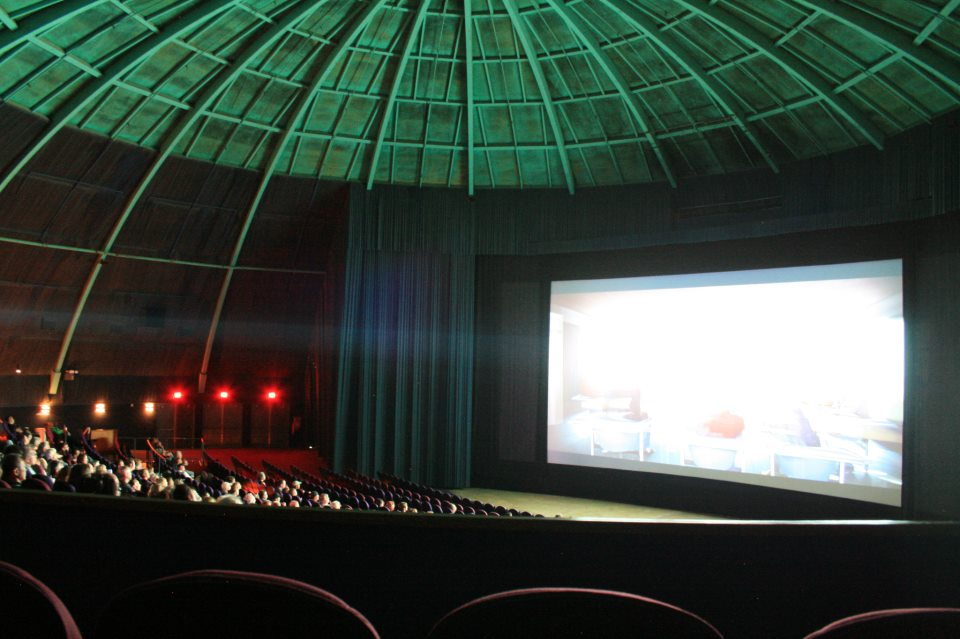
Interior of the CinéArts "Dome" Theater on its last night of operation – April 21, 2013

Starting in 2003, CinéArts operated the former Century 5 Theatres, screening primarily independent and foreign films. Due to changes in viewing habits, as many people screened movies at home, business continued to decline. The theater's property owner, SyWest Development, closed the Dome on April 21, 2013. On its last night of operation, CinéArts screened Stanley Kubrick's classic 2001: A Space Odyssey.

Sywest gained the approval of the Pleasant Hill City Council for its proposal to tear down the theater and redevelop the property as a two-story, 73,000+ square-foot building to house a Dick's Sporting Goods. Supporters of the theater submitted two separate appeals to overturn the approval of demolition: one by a resident of Pleasant Hill, and one by Save the Pleasant Hill Dome (SPHD) organization. Both appeals were voted down by a majority of the city council; Mayor Michael G. Harris and councilmember Ken Carlson voted in favor of the appeal. SyWest had the Dome demolished on May 8, 2013, precluding any further court action.

On October 14, 2019, a magnitude 4.5 earthquake shook the city.

== Geography and climate ==
According to the United States Census Bureau, the city has a total area of 7.1 square miles (18 square kilometers), 100% land. Pleasant Hill has a varied landscape with some valleys and rolling hills. In undisturbed wilderness, oak woodlands and mixed woods can be found. It is located in the central East San Francisco Bay.

This region has warm and dry summers, with no average monthly temperatures above 71 degrees Fahrenheit (22 degrees Celsius). According to the Köppen Climate Classification system, Pleasant Hill has a warm-summer Mediterranean climate, abbreviated "Csb" on climate maps. Winter daytime temperatures tend to be in the fifties to low sixties Fahrenheit (ten to seventeen Celsius), and summers range in the seventies to upper eighties Fahrenheit (twenty one to thirty one Celsius), occasionally reaching the low nineties Fahrenheit (thirty three to thirty four Celsius). On very rare occasions, the temperatures can reach the one hundred degree Fahrenheit (thirty eight Celsius) range during extreme heat waves. Freezing in winter is rare, but it does happen. Summer fog is occasional but winter fog is very common.

== Education ==
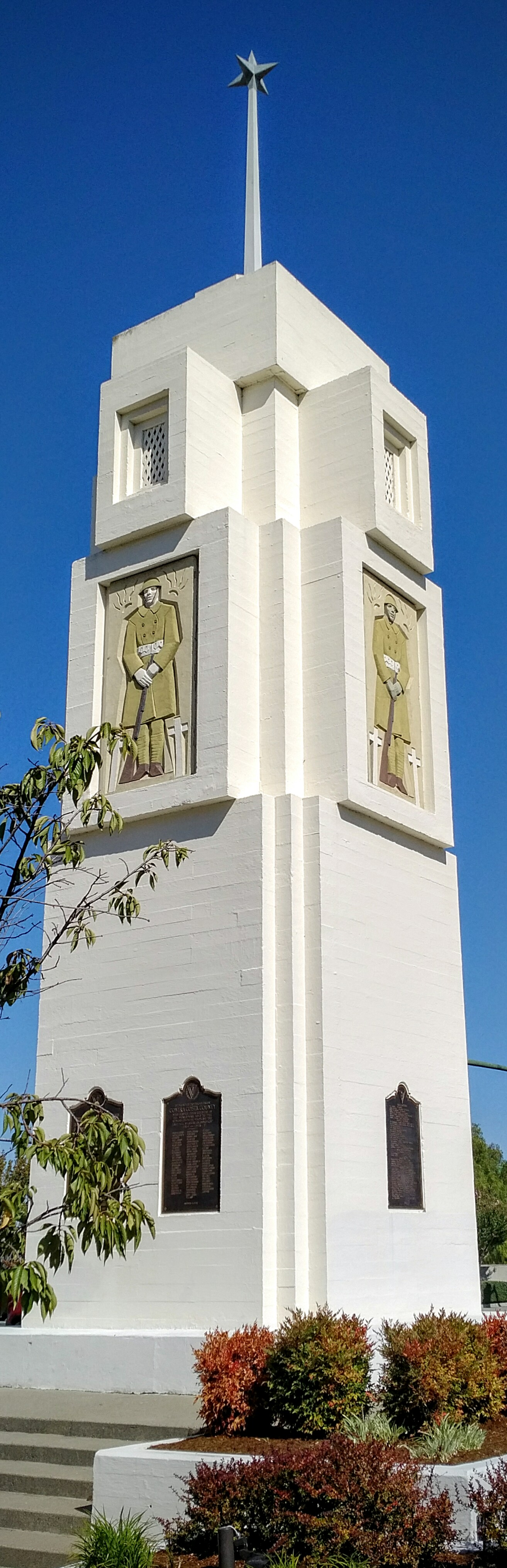
Soldiers Monument

=== Primary and secondary schools ===
==== Public schools ====
Elementary schools

- Fair Oaks Elementary School
- Gregory Gardens Elementary School
- Pleasant Hill Elementary School
- Sequoia Elementary School
- Strandwood Elementary School
- Valhalla Elementary School

Middle schools

- Pleasant Hill Middle School
- Sequoia Middle School
- Valley View Middle School

High schools

- College Park High School

==== Private schools ====
- Christ the King Catholic School
- Pleasant Hill Adventist Academy

=== Colleges and universities ===
- Diablo Valley College
- John F. Kennedy University
- Carrington College

=== Public libraries ===
The Pleasant Hill Library is part of the Contra Costa County Library system. The library system was headquartered in Pleasant Hill before relocating to Martinez in preparation for the construction of a new Pleasant Hill Library.

== Parks and recreation ==
Parks in Pleasant Hill are maintained and managed by the Pleasant Hill Recreation & Park District. The district is a separate entity from the City of Pleasant Hill.

- Brookwood Park
- Chilpancingo Park
- Dinosaur Hill Park
- Las Juntas Open Space
- Paso Nogal Park
- Pinewood Park
- Pleasant Hill Aquatic Park
- Pleasant Hill Education Center Pool
- Pleasant Hill Park
- Pleasant Oaks Park
- Rodgers Ranch Heritage Center (See Patrick Rodgers Farm)
- Rodgers-Smith Park
- Shannon Hills Park
- Sherman Acres Park
- Shadowood Park
- Soldiers Memorial Park (Owned by Contra Costa County)

== Demographics ==
Historical population
Census	Pop.	Note	%±
1950	5,686		—
1960	23,844		319.3%
1970	24,610		3.2%
1980	25,547		3.8%
1990	31,585		23.6%
2000	32,837		4.0%
2010	33,152		1.0%
2020	34,613		4.4%
U.S. Decennial Census

=== 2020 census ===
As of the 2020 census, Pleasant Hill had a population of 34,613. The population density was 4,892.3 inhabitants per square mile (1,888.9/km^{2}). The median age was 41.7 years. About 19.5% of residents were under the age of 18, and 19.1% were 65 years of age or older. For every 100 females, there were 93.2 males, and for every 100 females age 18 and over, there were 90.4 males age 18 and over.

The census reported that 98.2% of the population lived in households, 0.8% lived in non-institutionalized group quarters, and 1.0% were institutionalized. In addition, 100.0% of residents lived in urban areas, while 0.0% lived in rural areas.

There were 13,918 households, out of which 29.4% included children under the age of 18. Of all households, 50.0% were married-couple households, 6.7% were cohabiting couple households, 16.3% had a male householder with no spouse or partner present, and 27.0% had a female householder with no spouse or partner present. About 26.2% of households were one person, and 11.9% were one person aged 65 or older. The average household size was 2.44. There were 9,003 families (64.7% of all households).

There were 14,458 housing units at an average density of 2,043.5 units per square mile (789.0 units/km^{2}). Of all housing units, 3.7% were vacant and 96.3% were occupied. Of occupied housing units, 62.4% were owner-occupied and 37.6% were occupied by renters. The homeowner vacancy rate was 0.5%, and the rental vacancy rate was 5.5%.

Racial composition as of the 2020 census
Race	Number	Percent
White	21,825	63.1%
Black or African American	921	2.7%
American Indian and Alaska Native	201	0.6%
Asian	5,329	15.4%
Native Hawaiian and Other Pacific Islander	110	0.3%
Some other race	1,584	4.6%
Two or more races	4,643	13.4%
Hispanic or Latino (of any race)	4,957	14.3%

=== Income and poverty ===
In 2023, the US Census Bureau estimated that the median household income was $144,513, and the per capita income was $68,493. About 4.3% of families and 6.1% of the population were below the poverty line.

== Planning and environmental factors ==
The Gregory Gardens subdivision developed in 1950 required purchasers of new homes to accept a Covenant that restricted ownership to Caucasians (such provisions have since been ruled as unconstitutional). The Covenant also limited the structures that could be built, animals allowed on premises, and commercial activities.

Pleasant Hill used a system of environmental planning at a relatively early stage of its modern growth. Notably the city authorized a study in the 1980s of hillside development, which included detailed mapping of biota, geotechnical hazards, sound levels and other environmental constraints. These studies were used to establish appropriate zoning and development densities for all the principal undeveloped hillside areas within the city.

== Media ==
The city of Pleasant Hill is served by the East Bay Times daily newspaper, published by Bay Area News Group-East Bay (part of the Media News Group of Denver, Colorado). It is also served by the Community Focus newspaper. Community Focus is an independent, monthly newspaper that concentrates on local events and information.

The city is also served by Pleasant Hill Patch, a local news website covering community news and events. Patch Media is owned by AOL Inc.

== Sister cities ==
Pleasant Hill, California has one sister city, as designated by Sister Cities International:

- Chilpancingo, Mexico

== Notable people ==
- Adin Brown (born 1978), soccer player and coach
- Tom Hanks (born 1956), Academy Award and Golden Globe winning actor who grew up and spent his early childhood in Pleasant Hill
- Tim Scully (born 1944), underground LSD chemist
- Gary Simmons (born 1944), NHL hockey player
- Leslie Smith (born 1982), professional mixed martial artist
- Julie Strain (1962–2021), model and actress; attended Diablo Valley College
- Bob Roll (born 1960), professional cyclist, TV personality, cycling commentator, writer
- Bob Wilson (born 1940), singer, songwriter, guitarist and Era label recording artist
- Ron Wotus (born 1961), bench coach for the San Francisco Giants
- Oscar Verhoeven (born 2006), soccer player
