= Alice Tisdale Hobart =

American novelist

- Born: Alice Nourse; January 28, 1882; Lockport, New York, U.S.
- Died: March 14, 1964 (aged 82); Oakland, California, U.S.
- Spouse: Earle Tisdale Hobart (m. 1914)
- Writing career
- Notable work: Oil for the Lamps of China

Alice Tisdale Hobart (née Nourse; January 28, 1882 – March 14, 1967) was an American novelist. Her most famous book, Oil for the Lamps of China, which was also made into a film, drew heavily on her experiences as the wife of an American oil executive in China amid the turmoil of the overthrow of the Qing dynasty in 1912.

== Personal life ==
Spinal meningitis in infancy and a fall when she was seventeen left Alice Nourse with frail health and back trouble which caused her to be semi-invalid at periods throughout her life.

She attended the University of Chicago, but never graduated, opting instead to take a job. She first traveled to China in 1908 to visit her sister Mary, who taught at a girls' school in Hangzhou, and returned two years later to take up a post at the same establishment. After marrying Earle Tisdale Hobart, a Standard Oil Company executive, in Tientsin in 1914, she traveled to northeast China and in 1916 published an article on her experiences at the hands of Honghuzi bandits in The Atlantic Monthly. It led to a series of pieces entitled Leaves From a Manchurian Diary and formed the basis for her first book, Pioneering Where the World is Old in 1917.

Her life in Changsha formed the backdrop for her second book, By the City of the Long Sand in 1926, while an assault on Nanjing by Nationalist soldiers and her escape over the city wall to the safety of the waiting American gunboats was recounted in Within the Walls of Nanking in 1928. This book started as a piece in Harper's Magazine. Her fictional account of her experiences in China, not surprisingly, focused on the role played by Western businessmen, especially those engaged in importing and selling petroleum products.

Pidgin Cargo, set among traders on the Yangtze River, appeared in 1929 and Oil for the Lamps of China in 1933. After making her home in California in the 1940s, her subject matter expanded to encompass contemporary Mexico in The Peacock Sheds His Tail (1945) and Californian agrarian life in The Cup and the Sword (1942) and The Cleft Rock (1948). In 1959 she published her memoir, Gusty's Child.

She published more than a dozen novels in all by the time of her death in 1967, with almost four million copies in print.

== Writings ==
- Oil for the Lamps of China also published as an Armed Services Edition during WWII.
- Leaves From a Manchurian Diary
- Pioneering Where the World is Old
- By the City of the Long Sand
- Within the Walls of Nanking
- Pidgin Cargo
- River Supreme
- The Peacock Sheds His Tail
- The Cup and the Sword
- The Cleft Rock
- Gusty's Child
- Yang and Yin
- Their Own Country
- Venture Into Darkness
- The Serpent-Wreathed Staff
- The Innocent Dreamers

== See also ==
- Patrick Rodgers Farm

== Sources ==
- Novelguide
