= List of elections in 2004 =

The following elections occurred in the year 2004.

== Africa ==
- 2004 Algerian presidential election
- 2004 Botswana general election
- 2004 Botswana local elections
- 2004 Cameroonian presidential election
- 2004 Cape Verdean local elections
- 2004 Central African constitutional referendum
- 2004 Comorian legislative election
- 2004 Equatorial Guinean legislative election
- 2004 Ghanaian parliamentary election
- 2004 Ghanaian presidential election
- 2004 Guinea-Bissau legislative election
- 2004 Mahoran legislative election
- 2004 Malawian general election
- 2004 Mozambican general election
- 2004 Namibian general election
- 2004 Namibian local and regional elections
- 2004 Nigerien general election
- 2004 Nigerien parliamentary election
- 2004 Nigerien presidential election
- 2004 Somali presidential election
- 2004 South African general election
- 2004 South African presidential election
- 2004 Tunisian general election

== Asia ==
- 2004 Abkhazian local elections
- 2004 Abkhazian presidential election
- 2004 Afghan presidential election
- 2004–05 East Timorese local elections
- 2004 Georgian presidential election
- 2004 Georgian legislative election
- 2004 Hong Kong legislative election
- 2004 Indonesian legislative election
- 2004 Indonesian presidential election
- 2004 Iranian legislative election
- 2004 Kazakhstani legislative election
- 2004 Malaysian general election
- 2004 Mongolian legislative election
- 2004 Pakistani presidential election
- 2004–05 Palestinian local elections
- 2004 Republic of China legislative election (Taiwan)
- 2004 Republic of China presidential election (Taiwan)
- 2004 Russian presidential election
- 2004 South Korean legislative election
- 2004 Sri Lankan parliamentary election
- 2004 Sri Lankan provincial council election
- 2004 Turkish local elections
- 2004 Turkmen parliamentary election
- 2004–05 Uzbek parliamentary election

=== India ===
- Indian general election in Arunachal Pradesh, 2004
- Indian general election in Kerala, 2004
- Indian general election in Madhya Pradesh, 2004
- Indian general election in Sikkim, 2004
- Indian general elections, 2004-Assam
- Indian general elections, 2004-Regional Scenarios
- Indian general election full results, 2004
- Indian general election in Andhra Pradesh, 2004
- Indian general election in Assam, 2004
- Indian general election in Bihar, 2004
- Indian general election in Chhattisgarh, 2004
- Indian general election in Haryana, 2004
- Indian general election in Manipur, 2004
- Indian general election in Tamil Nadu, 2004
- 2004 Karnataka Legislative Assembly election
- 2004 Maharashtra state assembly elections
- State Assembly elections in India, 2004

==== Indian general ====
- 2004 Indian general election analysis
- India Shining
- Indian general election in Gujarat, 2004
- Indian general election in Karnataka, 2004
- Indian general election in National Capital Territory of Delhi, 2004
- 2004 Indian general election
- Results of the 2004 Indian general election by parliamentary constituency
- Results of the 2004 Indian general election in Tamil Nadu by assembly constituents

=== Japan ===
- 2004 Iwate gubernatorial election
- 2004 Japanese House of Councillors election

=== Malaysia ===
- 2004 Malaysian general election

=== Philippines ===
- 2004 Cebu City local elections
- 2004 Philippine House of Representatives elections
- 2004 Philippine Senate election
- 2004 Philippine general election
- 2004 Philippine presidential election

=== Russia ===
- Krasnodar Krai Head of Administration elections
- 2004 Russian presidential election

== Australia ==
- 2004 Australian Capital Territory election
- 2004 Australian federal election
  - 'Not happy, John!' campaign
- 2004 Dubbo state by-election
- 2004 Queensland state election

== Europe ==
- 2004 Belarusian parliamentary election
- 2004 Belarusian referendum
- 2004 Belgian regional elections
- 2004 Bosnia and Herzegovina municipal elections
- 2004 Czech Senate election
- 2004 Cypriot Annan Plan referendum
- Elections in Alderney
- 2004 European Parliament election in Slovenia
- 2004 Faroese parliamentary election
- 2004 Finnish local elections
- 2004 Georgian presidential election
- 2004 Georgian legislative election
- 2004 Greek legislative election
- 2004 Guernsey general election
- 2004 Icelandic presidential election
- 2004 Irish local elections
- 2004 Irish presidential election
- 2004 Kosovan parliamentary election
- 2004 Lithuanian parliamentary election
- 2004 Lithuanian presidential election
- 2004 Luxembourg general election
- 2004 Macedonian autonomy referendum
- 2004 Macedonian presidential election
- 2004 Montenegrin municipal elections
- 2004 Romanian legislative election
- 2004 Romanian local election
- 2004 Romanian presidential election
- 2004 Serbian presidential election
- 2004 Slovak presidential election
- 2004 Slovenian parliamentary election
- 2004 South Ossetian parliamentary election
- 2004 Swiss referendums
- 2004 Turkish local elections
- 2004 Ukrainian presidential election
- 2004 Vojvodina parliamentary election

=== Austria ===
- 2004 Austrian presidential election
- 2004 European Parliament election in Austria
- 2004 Vorarlberg state election

=== European Parliament ===
- 2004 European Parliament election
- 2004 European Parliament election in Austria
- 2004 European Parliament election in Belgium
- 2004 European Parliament election in Cyprus
- 2004 European Parliament election in the Czech Republic
- 2004 European Parliament election in Denmark
- 2004 European Parliament election in Estonia
- 2004 European Parliament election in Portugal
- 2004 European Parliament election in Aosta Valley
- 2004 European Parliament election in Lombardy
- 2004 European Parliament election in Piedmont
- 2004 European Parliament election in Sardinia
- 2004 European Parliament election in Sicily
- 2004 European Parliament election in Trentino-Alto Adige/Südtirol
- 2004 European Parliament election in Veneto
- 2004 European Parliament election in Finland
- 2004 European Parliament election in France
- 2004 European Parliament election in Germany
- 2004 European Parliament election in Gibraltar
- 2004 European Parliament election in Greece
- 2004 European Parliament election in Hungary
- 2004 European Parliament election in Ireland
- 2004 European Parliament election in Italy
- 2004 European Parliament election in Latvia
- 2004 European Parliament election in Lithuania
- 2004 European Parliament election in Luxembourg
- 2004 European Parliament election in Malta
- 2004 European Parliament election in the Netherlands
- 2004 European Parliament election in Poland
- 2004 European Parliament election in Slovakia
- 2004 European Parliament election in Slovenia
- 2004 European Parliament election in Spain
- 2004 European Parliament election in Sweden
- 2004 European Parliament election in the United Kingdom

=== Faroe Islands ===
- 2004 Faroese general election

=== France ===
- 2004 Alsace regional election
- 2004 Auvergne regional election
- 2004 Brittany regional election
- 2004 Champagne-Ardenne regional election
- 2004 European Parliament election in France
- 2004 Franche-Comté regional election
- 2004 French Polynesian legislative election
- 2004 French regional elections
- 2004 French Senate election
- 2004 French cantonal elections
- 2004 Île-de-France regional election
- 2004 Poitou-Charentes regional election
- 2004 Provence-Alpes-Côte d'Azur regional election
- 2004 Rhône-Alpes regional election

=== Georgia ===
- 2004 Georgian parliamentary election
- 2004 Georgian presidential election

=== Germany ===
- 2004 Brandenburg state election
- 2004 European Parliament election in Germany
- 2004 Hamburg state election
- 2004 German presidential election
- 2004 Saarland state election
- 2004 Saxony state election
- 2004 Thuringia state election

=== Greece ===
- 2004 Greek legislative election

=== Iceland ===
- 2004 Icelandic presidential election

=== Italy ===
- 2004 European Parliament election in Aosta Valley
- 2004 European Parliament election in Italy
- 2004 European Parliament election in Lombardy
- 2004 European Parliament election in Piedmont
- 2004 European Parliament election in Sardinia
- 2004 European Parliament election in Sicily
- 2004 European Parliament election in Trentino-Alto Adige/Südtirol
- 2004 European Parliament election in Veneto
- 2004 Sardinian regional election

=== Kosovo ===
- 2004 Kosovan parliamentary election

=== Lithuania ===
- 2004 Lithuanian parliamentary election
- 2004 Lithuanian presidential election
- 2004 Luxembourg general election

=== Macedonia ===
- 2004 Macedonian presidential election

=== Romania ===
- 2004 Romanian general election

=== Russia ===
- Krasnodar Krai Head of Administration elections
- 2004 Russian presidential election

=== San Marino ===
- 2004 Sammarinese local elections

=== Slovakia ===
- 2004 Slovak presidential election

=== Slovenia ===
- 2004 Slovenian parliamentary election

=== South Ossetia ===
- South Ossetian parliamentary election

=== Spain ===
- 2004 European Parliament election in Spain
- 2004 Spanish general election

=== United Kingdom ===
- 2004 United Kingdom elections
- 2004 European Parliament election in the United Kingdom
- 2004 Birmingham Hodge Hill by-election
- 2004 Hartlepool by-election
- 2004 Leicester South by-election
- 2004 United Kingdom local elections
- 2004 London Assembly election
- 2004 London mayoral election
- 2004 Ulster Unionist Party leadership election

==== United Kingdom local ====
- 2004 United Kingdom local elections

===== English local =====
- 2004 Adur Council election
- 2004 Amber Valley Council election
- 2004 Barnsley Council election
- 2004 Barrow-in-Furness Council election
- 2004 Bassetlaw Council election
- 2004 Blackburn with Darwen Council election
- 2004 Bolton Council election
- 2004 Brentwood Council election
- 2004 Broxbourne Council election
- 2004 Burnley Council election
- 2004 Calderdale Council election
- 2004 Cheltenham Council election
- 2004 Cherwell Council election
- 2004 Chorley Council election
- 2004 Coventry Council election
- 2004 Craven Council election
- 2004 Daventry Council election
- 2004 Derby Council election
- 2004 Eastleigh Council election
- 2004 Ellesmere Port and Neston Council election
- 2004 Epping Forest Council election
- 2004 Fareham Council election
- 2004 Gateshead Council election
- 2004 Gosport Council election
- 2004 Halton Council election
- 2004 Harlow Council election
- 2004 Hart Council election
- 2004 Hastings Council election
- 2004 Hull Council election
- 2004 Hyndburn Council election
- 2004 Ipswich Borough Council election
- 2004 Knowsley Council election
- 2004 Lincoln Council election
- 2004 Liverpool Council election
- 2004 Mole Valley Council election
- 2004 Newcastle-under-Lyme Council election
- 2004 North Tyneside Council election
- 2004 Nuneaton and Bedworth Council election
- 2004 Oxford City Council election
- 2004 Penwith Council election
- 2004 Portsmouth Council election
- 2004 Preston Council election
- 2004 Purbeck Council election
- 2004 Redditch Council election
- 2004 Rochdale Council election
- 2004 Rochford Council election
- 2004 Rossendale Council election
- 2004 Rugby Council election
- 2004 Runnymede Council election
- 2004 Rushmoor Council election
- 2004 Salford Council election
- 2004 Sefton Council election
- 2004 Sheffield Council election
- 2004 Slough Council election
- 2004 Solihull Council election
- 2004 South Lakeland Council election
- 2004 South Tyneside Council election
- 2004 Southend-on-Sea Council election
- 2004 St Albans Council election
- 2004 St Helens Council election
- 2004 Stevenage Council election
- 2004 Stratford-on-Avon Council election
- 2004 Swindon Council election
- 2004 Tamworth Council election
- 2004 Tandridge Council election
- 2004 Three Rivers Council election
- 2004 Thurrock Council election
- 2004 Trafford Council election
- 2004 Tunbridge Wells Council election
- 2004 Wakefield Council election
- 2004 Watford Council election
- 2004 Welwyn Hatfield Council election
- 2004 West Lancashire Council election
- 2004 West Lindsey Council election
- 2004 Weymouth and Portland Council election
- 2004 Wigan Council election
- 2004 Winchester Council election
- 2004 Wirral Council election
- 2004 Woking Council election
- 2004 Wokingham Council election
- 2004 Wolverhampton Council election
- 2004 Worcester Council election
- 2004 Worthing Council election
- 2004 Wyre Forest Council election

== North America ==
- 2004 Panamanian general election
- 2004 Salvadoran presidential election

=== Canada ===
- 2004 Canadian federal election
- 2004 Alberta Senate nominee election
- Alberta Student Vote, 2004
- 2004 Alberta general election
- 2004 Conservative Party of Canada leadership election
- 2004 New Brunswick municipal elections
- 2004 Halifax Regional Municipality municipal election
- 2004 Nunavut general election
- 2004 Progressive Conservative Party of Ontario leadership election
- 2004 Quebec provincial by-elections

==== Alberta municipal ====
- 2004 Calgary municipal election
- 2004 Edmonton municipal election

=== Caribbean ===
- 2004 Antigua and Barbuda general election
- 2004 Dominican Republic presidential election
- 2004 Saint Kitts and Nevis general election

==== Puerto Rican ====
- 2004 Puerto Rican general election

=== Mexico ===
- 2004 Mexican elections
- 2004 Chihuahua state election
- 2004 Durango state election
- 2004 Oaxaca state election
- 2004 Zacatecas state election

=== Puerto Rican ===
- 2004 Puerto Rican general election

=== United States ===
- 2004 United States elections
- 2004 United States presidential election

==== United States lieutenant gubernatorial ====
- 2004 Delaware lieutenant gubernatorial election
- 2004 Missouri lieutenant gubernatorial election
- 2004 North Carolina lieutenant gubernatorial election
- 2004 Washington lieutenant gubernatorial election

==== United States gubernatorial ====
- 2004 Delaware gubernatorial election
- 2004 Indiana gubernatorial election
- 2004 Missouri lieutenant gubernatorial election
- 2004 Missouri gubernatorial election
- 2004 Montana gubernatorial election
- 2004 New Hampshire gubernatorial election
- 2004 North Carolina gubernatorial election
- 2004 North Dakota gubernatorial election
- 2004 United States gubernatorial elections
- 2004 Utah gubernatorial election
- 2004 Vermont gubernatorial election
- 2004 Washington gubernatorial election
- 2004 West Virginia gubernatorial election

==== United States mayoral ====
- 2004 Alexandria, Louisiana mayoral election
- 2004 Bakersfield, California, mayoral election
- 2004 Baltimore mayoral election
- 2004 Baton Rouge mayoral election
- 2004 El Paso mayoral special election
- 2004 Fresno mayoral election
- 2004 Honolulu mayoral election
- 2004 Irvine mayoral election
- 2004 Miami-Dade County mayoral election
- 2004 Milwaukee mayoral election
- 2004 New Orleans mayoral election
- 2004 Oakland mayoral special election
- 2004 Orlando mayoral special election
- 2004 Portland, Oregon mayoral election
- 2004 Sacramento mayoral election
- 2004 San Jose mayoral election
- 2004 Washington, D.C. mayoral special election

==== Alabama ====
- 2004 Alabama elections
- 2004 Alabama Democratic presidential primary
- 2004 United States Senate election in Alabama
- 2004 United States presidential election in Alabama

==== Alaska ====
- 2004 United States presidential election in Alaska
- 2004 United States Senate election in Alaska

==== American Samoa ====
- 2004 American Samoan general election

==== Arizona ====
- 2004 Arizona Democratic presidential primary
- 2004 Arizona Proposition 200
- Maricopa County Sheriff's Office
- 2004 United States Senate election in Arizona
- 2004 United States presidential election in Arizona
- Wisconsin Democratic primary, 2004

==== Arkansas ====
- 2004 United States Senate election in Arkansas
- 2004 United States presidential election in Arkansas

==== California ====
- 2004 California state elections
- 2004 California Democratic presidential primary
- 2004 California Republican presidential primary
- 2004 San Francisco Board of Supervisors elections
- March 2004 San Francisco general elections
- November 2004 San Francisco general elections
- 2004 California State Senate elections
- 2004 California State Assembly elections

===== California congressional =====
- 2004 United States Senate election in California

==== Colorado ====
- United States Senate election in Colorado, 2004

==== Connecticut ====
- United States presidential election in Connecticut, 2004
- United States Senate election in Connecticut, 2004

==== Delaware ====
- Delaware Democratic primary, 2004
- 2004 Delaware gubernatorial election
- United States presidential election in Delaware, 2004

==== Florida ====
- United States Senate election in Florida, 2004
- United States presidential election in Florida, 2004

==== Georgia (U.S. state) ====
- United States House of Representatives elections in Georgia, 2004
- United States Senate election in Georgia, 2004
- United States presidential election in Georgia, 2004

==== Guam ====
- 2004 Guamanian general election

==== Hawaii ====
- United States Senate election in Hawaii, 2004
- United States presidential election in Hawaii, 2004

==== Indiana ====
- 2004 Indiana gubernatorial election
- United States presidential election in Indiana, 2004
- United States Senate election in Indiana, 2004

==== Iowa ====
- Iowa Democratic caucuses, 2004
- United States presidential election in Iowa, 2004
- United States Senate election in Iowa, 2004

==== Kansas ====
- United States Senate election in Kansas, 2004
- United States presidential election in Kansas, 2004

==== Kentucky ====
- 2004 Kentucky's 6th congressional district special election
- United States presidential election in Kentucky, 2004
- United States House of Representatives elections in Kentucky, 2004
- United States Senate election in Kentucky, 2004

==== Louisiana ====
- United States presidential election in Louisiana, 2004
- United States Senate election in Louisiana, 2004

==== Maine ====
- Maine Democratic caucuses, 2004
- United States presidential election in Maine, 2004

==== Maryland ====
- Maryland Democratic primary, 2004
- United States Senate election in Maryland, 2004
- United States presidential election in Maryland, 2004

==== Massachusetts ====
- United States presidential election in Massachusetts, 2004
- 2004 Massachusetts Senate elections

==== Michigan ====
- Michigan Democratic caucuses, 2004
- United States presidential election in Michigan, 2004

==== Minnesota ====
- United States presidential election in Minnesota, 2004

==== Missouri ====
- Missouri Democratic primary, 2004
- 2004 Missouri gubernatorial election
- 2004 Missouri Lieutenant gubernatorial election
- United States presidential election in Missouri, 2004
- Missouri Republican primary, 2004
- 2004 United States Senate election in Missouri

==== Montana ====
- 2004 Montana gubernatorial election
- United States presidential election in Montana, 2004

==== Nebraska ====
- United States presidential election in Nebraska, 2004

==== Nevada ====
- Nevada Democratic caucuses, 2004
- United States presidential election in Nevada, 2004
- United States Senate election in Nevada, 2004

==== New Hampshire ====
- New Hampshire Democratic primary, 2004
- 2004 New Hampshire gubernatorial election
- 2004 New Hampshire state elections
- United States Senate election in New Hampshire, 2004
- United States presidential election in New Hampshire, 2004

==== New Jersey ====
- 2004 Jersey City mayoral special election
- New Jersey Democratic primary, 2004
- United States presidential election in New Jersey, 2004

==== New Mexico ====
- New Mexico Democratic caucuses, 2004
- United States presidential election in New Mexico, 2004

==== North Carolina ====
- 2004 North Carolina judicial elections
- 2004 North Carolina lieutenant gubernatorial election
- 2004 North Carolina Council of State election
- 2004 North Carolina General Assembly election
- United States House of Representatives elections in North Carolina, 2004
- United States Senate election in North Carolina, 2004
- United States presidential election in North Carolina, 2004

==== North Dakota ====
- North Dakota Democratic caucuses, 2004
- 2004 North Dakota gubernatorial election
- United States presidential election in North Dakota, 2004
- United States Senate election in North Dakota, 2004

==== Ohio ====
- United States presidential election in Ohio, 2004
- United States Senate election in Ohio, 2004

==== Oklahoma ====
- Oklahoma Democratic primary, 2004
- United States presidential election in Oklahoma, 2004
- United States Senate election in Oklahoma, 2004

==== Oregon ====
- United States presidential election in Oregon, 2004
- United States Senate election in Oregon, 2004

==== Pennsylvania ====
- 2004 Pennsylvania Attorney General election
- 2004 Pennsylvania Auditor General election
- Pennsylvania Democratic primary, 2004
- 2004 Pennsylvania House of Representatives election
- 2004 Pennsylvania Senate election
- 2004 Pennsylvania state elections
- 2004 Pennsylvania State Treasurer election
- United States presidential election in Pennsylvania, 2004
- United States House of Representatives elections in Pennsylvania, 2004
- United States Senate election in Pennsylvania, 2004

==== Puerto Rican ====
- 2004 Puerto Rican general election

==== Rhode Island ====
- United States presidential election in Rhode Island, 2004

==== South Carolina ====
- United States presidential election in South Carolina, 2004
- South Carolina Democratic primary, 2004
- United States Senate election in South Carolina, 2004

==== South Dakota ====
- United States House of Representatives elections in South Dakota, 2004
- United States presidential election in South Dakota, 2004
- United States Senate election in South Dakota, 2004

==== Tennessee ====
- United States presidential election in Tennessee, 2004
- Tennessee Democratic primary, 2004

==== Texas ====
- United States House of Representatives elections in Texas, 2004
- United States presidential election in Texas, 2004

==== United States House of Representatives ====
- 2004 United States House of Representatives elections
- United States House of Representatives elections in California, 2004
- United States House of Representatives elections in Georgia, 2004
- United States House of Representatives elections in Indiana, 2004
- United States House of Representatives elections in Kentucky, 2004
- 2004 Kentucky's 6th congressional district special election
- United States House of Representatives elections in New York, 2004
- 2004 North Carolina's 1st congressional district special election
- United States House of Representatives election in North Dakota, 2004
- United States House of Representatives elections in South Carolina, 2004
- United States House of Representatives elections in South Dakota, 2004
- United States House of Representatives elections in Texas, 2004
- United States House of Representatives elections in Washington, 2004

==== United States Senate ====
- 2004 United States Senate elections
- United States Senate election in Alabama, 2004
- United States Senate election in Alaska, 2004
- United States Senate election in Arizona, 2004
- United States Senate election in Arkansas, 2004
- United States Senate election in California, 2004
- United States Senate election in Colorado, 2004
- United States Senate election in Connecticut, 2004
- United States Senate election in Florida, 2004
- United States Senate election in Georgia, 2004
- United States Senate election in Idaho, 2004
- United States Senate election in Illinois, 2004
- United States Senate election in Indiana, 2004
- United States Senate election in Iowa, 2004
- United States Senate election in Kansas, 2004
- United States Senate election in Kentucky, 2004
- United States Senate election in Louisiana, 2004
- United States Senate election in Maryland, 2004
- 2004 United States Senate election in Missouri
- United States Senate election in Nevada, 2004
- United States Senate election in New Hampshire, 2004
- United States Senate election in North Carolina, 2004
- United States Senate election in North Dakota, 2004
- United States Senate election in Ohio, 2004
- United States Senate election in Oklahoma, 2004
- United States Senate election in Oregon, 2004
- United States Senate election in Pennsylvania, 2004
- United States Senate election in South Carolina, 2004
- United States Senate election in South Dakota, 2004
- United States Senate election in Utah, 2004
- United States Senate election in Vermont, 2004
- United States Senate election in Washington, 2004
- United States Senate election in Wisconsin, 2004

==== Utah ====
- United States presidential election in Utah, 2004
- United States Senate election in Utah, 2004
- 2004 Utah gubernatorial election

==== Washington (U.S. state) ====
- 2004 Washington elections
- United States presidential election in Washington, 2004
- 2004 Washington State Supreme Court election
- United States House of Representatives elections in Washington, 2004
- United States Senate election in Washington, 2004
- 2004 Washington attorney general election
- 2004 Washington gubernatorial election
- Washington Initiative 872 (2004)
- 2004 Washington secretary of state election
- 2004 Washington State Senate election
- Washington ballot measures, 2004

==== Washington, D.C. ====
- District of Columbia Democratic primary, 2004
- United States presidential election in the District of Columbia, 2004

==== West Virginia ====
- United States presidential election in West Virginia, 2004
- 2004 West Virginia gubernatorial election

==== Wyoming ====
- United States presidential election in Wyoming, 2004

== Oceania ==
- 2004 American Samoan general election
- 2004 Palauan constitutional referendum
- 2004 Cook Islands general election
- 2004 French Polynesian legislative election
- 2004 Nauruan parliamentary election
- 2004 New Caledonian legislative election
- 2004 New Zealand local elections
- 2004 Palauan general election
- 2004 Pitcairn Islands general election
- 2004 Vanuatuan general election

=== American Samoa ===
- 2004 American Samoan general election

=== Australia ===
- 2004 Australian Capital Territory election
- 2004 Australian federal election
- 2004 Dubbo state by-election
- 'Not happy, John!' campaign
- 2004 Queensland state election
- 2004 Results of the Australian federal election

=== Guam ===
- 2004 Guamanian general election

=== Hawaii ===
- United States Senate election in Hawaii, 2004
- United States presidential election in Hawaii, 2004

=== New Zealand ===
- 2004 Dunedin mayoral election
- 2004 New Zealand local elections
- 2004 Te Tai Hauauru by-election
- 2004 Wellington City mayoral election

== South America ==
- 2004 Bolivian gas referendum
- 2004 Brazilian municipal elections
- 2004 Uruguayan general election
- 2004 Uruguayan constitutional referendum
- 2004 Venezuelan recall referendum
- 2004 Venezuelan regional elections
