= 2004 Champagne-Ardenne regional election =

← 1998	21 March and 28 March 2004	2010 →

All 49 seats to the Champagne-Ardenne Regional Council
	First party	Second party	Third party
Leader	Jean-Paul Bachy	Jean-Claude Etienne	Bruno Subtil
Party	PS	UMP	FN
Seats won	28	15	6
Popular vote	228 569	217 424	99 728
Percentage	41,88%	39,84%	18,27%
President before election
Jean-Claude Etienne
UMP
Elected President
Jean-Paul Bachy
PS

A regional election took place in Champagne-Ardenne on March 21 and March 28, 2004, along with all other regions. Jean-Paul Bachy (PS) was elected President, defeating incumbent Jean-Claude Etienne (UMP).

== Election results ==
Franche-Comté regional election, 2004
Party	Candidate	Votes	%	±%
PS	Jean-Paul Bachy	141,099	27.94	
UMP	Jean-Claude Etienne	134 640	26.66	
FN	Bruno Subtil	99,592	19.72	
UDF	Charles de Courson	56,110	11.11	
LV	Marie-Angèle Klaine	37,937	7.51	
LCR	Thomas Rose	25,247	5.00	
MNR	Jacques Gaillard	10,360	2.05	
Turnout		529 996	58.71	
Majority				
PS	Jean-Paul Bachy	228,569	41.88	
UMP	Jean-Claude Etienne	217,424	39.84	
FN	Bruno Subtil	99 728	18.27	
Majority				
Turnout		566 365	62.75	
PS gain from UMP		Swing	2.04	
