= Jean-Paul Bachy =

French politician

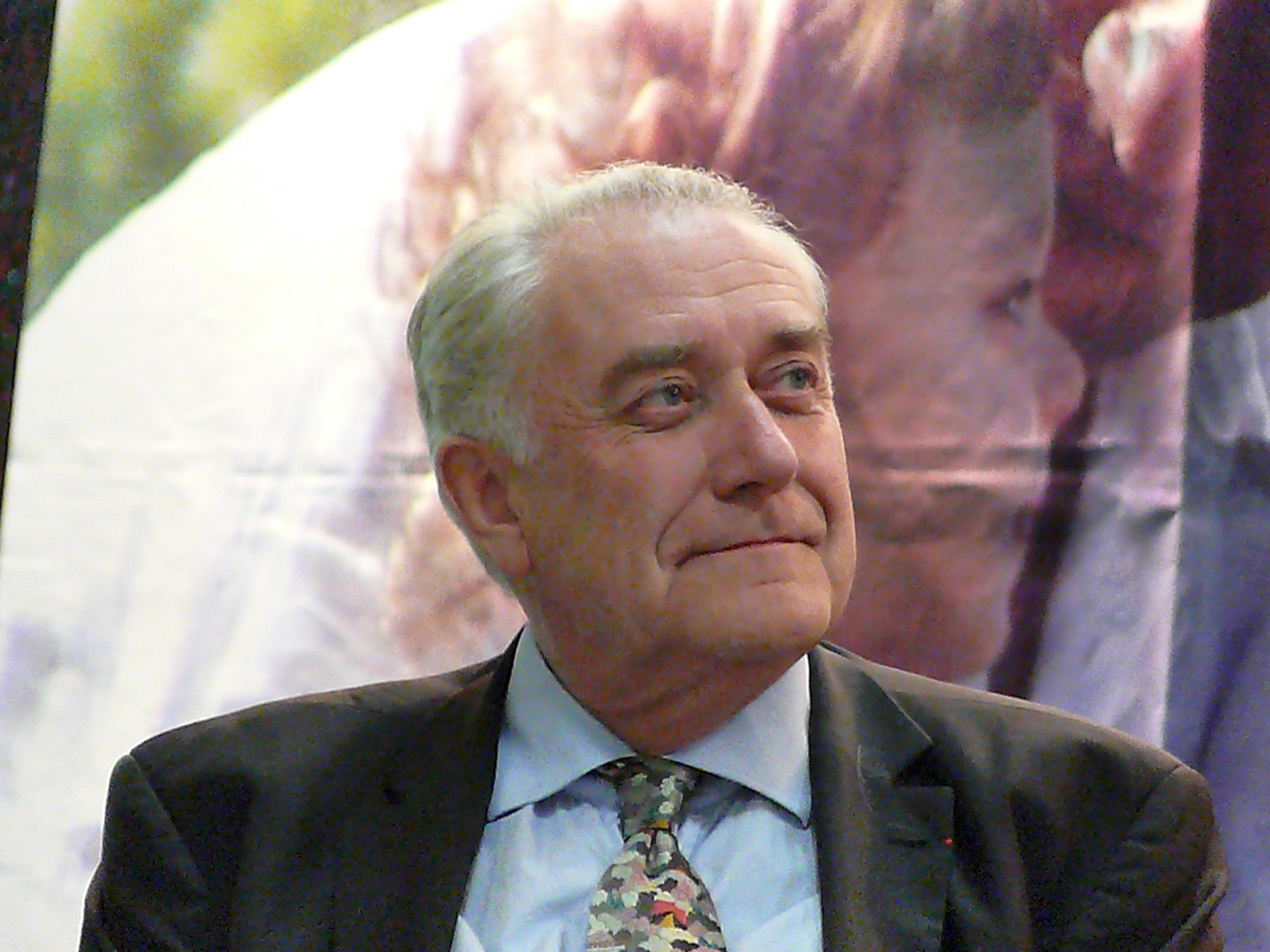

Jean-Paul Bachy (born March 30, 1947, in Charleville-Mézières, Ardennes) is a French politician and the incumbent President of the Regional Council of Champagne-Ardenne. He is a member of the Socialist Party.

Bachy served as Member of the European Parliament (1983–1988), deputy for the Ardennes (1988–1993) and Mayor of Sedan (1995–2004). He has been a regional councillor since 1986, and was the PS' top candidate in the region in the 2004 French regional elections. He narrowly defeated UMP incumbent Jean-Claude Etienne and became President of the Regional Council. He was excluded from the PS after running against an official PS candidate in the 2007 French legislative election.

Since he is not a member of the PS, he could not run in the party's primaries for the 2010 regional elections but Jacques Meyer, a supporter of Bachy won the primaries and intends to give Bachy the leadership of the PS list in the region.
