= Mireille Oudit =

French politician

Mireille Oudit (born 10 October 1945) is a French politician. She represented the department of Marne in the French Senate from 3 November 2010 to 30 September 2011 as a Union for a Popular Movement member.

She operates a farm. She was mayor of Val-de-Vière from 1995 to 2008.

During her time in office, Oudit served as a member of the Commission de la Culture, de l'Éducation et de la Communication.

She did not run for reelection in 2011.

She married François Oudit in 1964; the couple had seven children. He died in 2016.
