= 2004 Indian general election analysis =

Indian lower house election

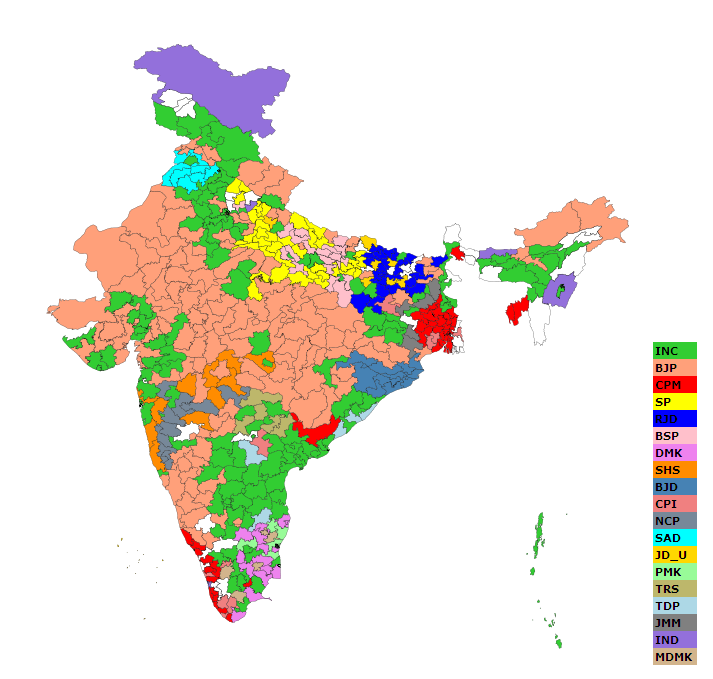

The 2004 general elections defied the predictions made by pre-poll predictions and exit polls and allowed the newly formed UPA alliance led by Sonia Gandhi, to come to power. This election also saw the rise of marginalized parties like the left, to join forces with the opposition, which led to a major realignment in social and political power.
Though pre-poll predictions were for an overwhelming majority for the BJP, the exit polls (immediately after the elections and before the counting began) predicted a hung parliament. However, even the exit polls could only indicate the general trend and nowhere close to the final figures. There is also the general perception that as soon as the BJP started realising that events might not proceed entirely in its favour, it changed the focus of its campaign from India Shining to issues of stability. The Congress, who was regarded as "old-fashioned" by the ruling BJP, was largely backed by poor, rural, lower-caste and minority voters that did not participate in the economic boom of previous years that created a large wealthy middle class, and thus it achieved its overwhelming victory.
The reverses in the pre-poll predictions are ascribed to various reasons depending on the point of view.

- People were more concerned about issues of their immediate environment such as water scarcity, drought, etc., than national issues.
- The anti-incumbency factor was at work for the BJP allies.

== State by State analysis ==
=== Andhra Pradesh ===
Voting Pattern in Andhra Pradesh
Social Background	INC+	TDP+
Gender
Male	47%	42%
Female	54%	41%
Social Class
Poor	49%	43%
Very Poor	50%	41%
OBCs
Peasant OBCs	45%	48%
Lower OBCs	47%	45%
Rural Classes
Farmers	41%	49%
Agricultural workers	51%	41%
Young voters	57%	38%

Source: NES Election 2004 Analysis

=== Karnataka ===
Voting pattern in KarnatakaConsiderable dissatisfaction with the government
Category	INC	BJP+	JD(S)	Others
Upper caste	23%	65%	7%	5%
Vokkaliga	38%	18%	43%	1%
Lingayat	30%	60%	5%	5%
OBCs	35%	36%	23%	6%
Dalit	45%	32%	8%	16%
Adivasi	29%	35%	35%	2%
Muslims	55%	19%	21%	5%
Others	39%	37%	15%	9%
Category	Deteriorated	Same as before	Improved	No opinion
Corruption	49%	26%	11%	13%
Drinking water	44%	26%	24%	5%
Uninterrupted power supply	39%	27%	28%	4%

Source: NES Election 2004 Analysis

=== Kerala ===
Voting pattern in KeralaConsiderable dissatisfaction with the Anthony government
Category	LDF	UDF	BJP	
Hindu upper castes	40%	37%	18%	
Nairs	41%	29%	27%	
Ezhavas	59%	22%	18%	
OBCs	49%	36%	13%	
Dalits	71%	15%	10%	
Muslims	39%	58%	2%	
Christians	28%	64%	2%	
Category	Deteriorated	Same as before	Improved	No opinion
Drinking water	49%	32%	16%	3%
PDS	38%	42%	14%	6%
Public health	27%	43%	23%	7%
Education	23%	31%	38%	7%
Electricity	31%	44%	19%	6%
Employment	50%	32%	13%	5%
Agriculture	59%	22%	13%	6%
Industries	40%	34%	15%	11%

Source: NES Election 2004 Analysis

=== Tamil Nadu ===
Voting Pattern in Tamil NaduKarunanidhi rated better than Jayalalithaa
Category	DMK+	AIADMK+	Others
Gender
Male	54%	32%	14%
Female	49%	39%	12%
Locality
Rural	50%	35%	15%
Urban	57%	36%	7%
Social class
Very poor	44%	37%	17%
Poor	55%	31%	14%
Lower middle	57%	37%	6%
Middle	51%	39%	10%
Caste
Upper caste	33%	54%	13%
Thevar	50%	47%	3%
Vanniyars	61%	33%	6%
Chettiyars	47%	30%	23%
Gounders	57%	33%	10%
Nadars	57%	36%	7%
Lower OBCs	55%	33%	12%
Chekkliyars, Pallars, etc.	39%	38%	23%
other Dalits	40%	37%	23%
Muslims	78%	11%	11%
Tell me how good each of the leaders are for Tamil Nadu...
Rating	M. Karunanidhi	J. Jayalalithaa	
Bad	13%	31%	
Average	31%	33%	
Good	29%	17%	
Very good	22%	14%	
Do not know	5%	5%	

Source: NES Election 2004 Analysis
