= 2004 European Parliament election in Sicily =

The European Parliament election of 2004 took place on 12–13 June 2004.

The Olive Tree was the most voted list in Sicily with 28.6%, followed by Forza Italia (21.5%), National Alliance (14.5%) and the Union of Christian and Centre Democrats (14.0%). Raffaele Lombardo, who was elected to the European Parliament for the Christian Democrats, left that party in 2005 to launch the Movement for Autonomy, which would have become a stable political force in the region.

== Results ==
Parties	votes	votes (%)
The Olive Tree: Democracy is Freedom – The Daisy; Democrats of the Left; Italian Democratic Socialists; European Republicans Movement	646,267	28.6
Forza Italia	486,080	21.5
National Alliance	328,697	14.5
Union of Christian and Centre Democrats	315,818	14.0
Communist Refoundation Party	82,054	3.6
Popular Alliance – UDEUR	61,364	2.7
Italy of Values–Civil Society–Occhetto	42,002	1.9
United Socialists for Europe	39,942	1.8
Federation of the Greens	38,671	1.7
Party of Italian Communists	38,187	1.7
Bonino List	32,027	1.4
Social Alternative	28,849	1.3
New Country	24,726	1.1
Consumers' List	24,233	1.1
Italian Republican Party–The Liberals-Sgarbi	22,417	1.0
Others	49,048	3.2
Total	2,260,382	100.0

Source: Ministry of the Interior
