= 2004 Auvergne regional election =

← 1998	21 March and 28 March 2004	2010 →

All 47 seats to the Auvergne Regional Council
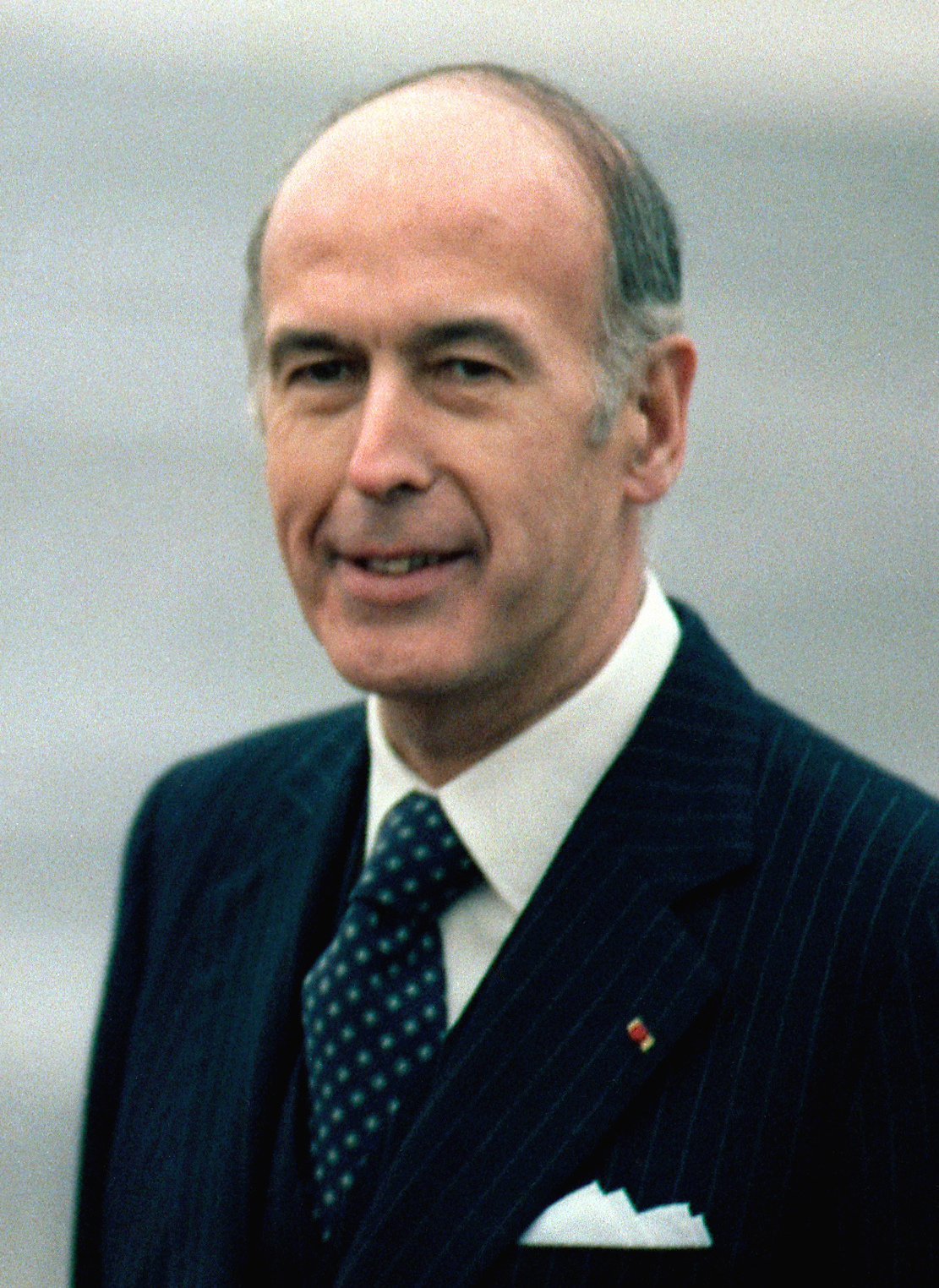
	First party	Second party
Leader	Pierre-Joël Bonté	Valéry Giscard d'Estaing
Party	PS	UMP
Seats won	30	17
Popular vote	333 301	299 483
Percentage	52,67%	47,33
President before election
Valéry Giscard d'Estaing
UMP
Elected President
Pierre-Joël Bonté
PS

A regional election took place in Auvergne on 21 March and 28 March 2004, along with all other regions. Pierre-Joël Bonté (PS) was elected President, defeating incumbent Valéry Giscard d'Estaing, a former President of France.
