= 2004 Worcester City Council election =

English local authority election

Map of the results of the 2004 Worcester council election. Conservatives in blue, Labour in red, independent in grey and Liberal Democrats in yellow.

The 2004 Worcester City Council election took place on 10 June 2004 to elect members of Worcester City Council in Worcestershire, England. The whole council was up for election with boundary changes since the last election in 2003 reducing the number of seats by one. The Conservative Party stayed in overall control of the council.

== Campaign ==
Before the election the council was composed of 18 Conservatives, 10 Labour, 4 independents, 2 Liberal Democrats, 1 independent Conservative and 1 vacant seat. Boundary changes saw the number of seats reduced from 36 to 35 for the 2004 election, meaning that the whole council would be up for election for the first time since 1976. This also meant that the number of wards was increased from 12 to 15, with new wards including Cathedral and Rainbow Hill.

All parties were hoping to make gains with the Conservatives defending their record in control of the council, which they said included having a balanced budget and keeping the council tax rise down to 2.5%. Other issues raised in the election included recycling, improving public transport, dealing with traffic congestion and keeping the streets clean.

== Election result ==
The results saw the Conservatives achieve a majority on the council after winning 18 of the 35 seats. Labour remained on 10 seats while the Liberal Democrats gained 1 to hold 3 seats.

Worcester local election result 2004
| Party | Seats | Gains | Losses | Net gain/loss | Seats % | Votes % | Votes | +/− |
|---|---|---|---|---|---|---|---|---|
| Conservative | 18 | | | -1 | 51.4 | 45.6 | 24,729 | +4.3% |
| Labour | 10 | | | 0 | 28.6 | 28.8 | 15,576 | -7.1% |
| Independent | 4 | | | -1 | 11.4 | 8.6 | 4,653 | -0.9% |
| Liberal Democrats | 3 | | | +1 | 8.6 | 15.4 | 8,346 | +4.6% |
| BNP | 0 | | | 0 | 0 | 1.6 | 871 | +0.4% |

== Ward results ==
Arboretum (2)
| Party | Candidate | Votes | % | ±% |
|---|---|---|---|---|
| Labour | Robert Peachey | 694 | | |
| Labour | Richard Bird | 693 | | |
| Conservative | Jonathon Cunningham | 656 | | |
| Conservative | Haris Saleem | 524 | | |
| Liberal Democrats | Oliver Orr | 471 | | |
| Turnout | | 3,038 | 41 | |

Battenhall (2)
| Party | Candidate | Votes | % | ±% |
|---|---|---|---|---|
| Conservative | Robert Rowden | 906 | | |
| Conservative | David Tibbutt | 833 | | |
| Liberal Democrats | Louis Stephen | 456 | | |
| Labour | Andrew Watson | 411 | | |
| Liberal Democrats | Paul Griffiths | 399 | | |
| Labour | Christopher Winwood | 344 | | |
| Turnout | | 3,349 | 44 | |

Bedwardine (3)
| Party | Candidate | Votes | % | ±% |
|---|---|---|---|---|
| Conservative | Derek Prodger | 1,313 | | |
| Conservative | David Clark | 1,112 | | |
| Conservative | Barry Mackenzie-Williams | 935 | | |
| Liberal Democrats | Vaughan Hencher | 690 | | |
| Labour | Gary Kibblewhite | 689 | | |
| BNP | Mark Heaton | 410 | | |
| Turnout | | 5,149 | 40 | |

Cathedral (3)
| Party | Candidate | Votes | % | ±% |
|---|---|---|---|---|
| Conservative | Francis Lankester | 1,302 | | |
| Conservative | Allah Ditta | 1,168 | | |
| Conservative | Mohammed Riaz | 1,071 | | |
| Labour | Ali Asghar | 780 | | |
| Labour | Simon Cronin | 777 | | |
| Labour | Patricia Agar | 771 | | |
| Liberal Democrats | Iain Macbriar | 658 | | |
| Turnout | | 6,527 | 41 | |

Claines (3)
| Party | Candidate | Votes | % | ±% |
|---|---|---|---|---|
| Liberal Democrats | Susan Askin | 1,709 | | |
| Liberal Democrats | Ruth Smith | 1,581 | | |
| Liberal Democrats | Alexander Kear | 1,399 | | |
| Conservative | William Elsy | 1,228 | | |
| Conservative | Nicola Lynas | 1,165 | | |
| Conservative | Robert Campbell | 1,138 | | |
| Labour | Clive Andrews | 535 | | |
| Turnout | | 8,755 | 51 | |

Gorse Hill (2)
| Party | Candidate | Votes | % | ±% |
|---|---|---|---|---|
| Labour | Roger Berry | 709 | | |
| Labour | Geoffrey Williams | 601 | | |
| BNP | Martin Roberts | 461 | | |
| Conservative | Gordon Hazelton | 321 | | |
| Turnout | | 2,092 | 34 | |

Nunnery (3)
| Party | Candidate | Votes | % | ±% |
|---|---|---|---|---|
| Independent | Michael Layland | 1,233 | | |
| Independent | Keith Burton | 951 | | |
| Independent | Stanley Knowles | 747 | | |
| Labour | Nicholas Balsdon | 701 | | |
| Labour | Christopher Taylor | 604 | | |
| Conservative | James Maguire | 482 | | |
| Turnout | | 4,718 | 37 | |

Rainbow Hill (2)
| Party | Candidate | Votes | % | ±% |
|---|---|---|---|---|
| Labour | Adrian Gregson | 641 | | |
| Labour | Paul Denham | 570 | | |
| Conservative | Nicholas Turner | 344 | | |
| Conservative | Sajeeda Begum | 275 | | |
| Turnout | | 1,830 | 26 | |

St. Clement (2)
| Party | Candidate | Votes | % | ±% |
|---|---|---|---|---|
| Conservative | Simon Geraghty | 940 | | |
| Conservative | Ian Imray | 734 | | |
| Labour | Allyson Craigan | 503 | | |
| Independent | Brian Chadd | 435 | | |
| Independent | Paul Coveney | 373 | | |
| Turnout | | 2,985 | 39 | |

St. John (3)
| Party | Candidate | Votes | % | ±% |
|---|---|---|---|---|
| Independent | Margaret Layland | 914 | | |
| Labour | David Candler | 822 | | |
| Labour | Samuel Arnold | 795 | | |
| Labour | Matthew Lamb | 764 | | |
| Conservative | Alastair Little | 584 | | |
| Conservative | Stephen Hall | 538 | | |
| Turnout | | 4,417 | 33 | |

St. Peter's (2)
| Party | Candidate | Votes | % | ±% |
|---|---|---|---|---|
| Conservative | Roger Knight | 1,047 | | |
| Conservative | Frank Tarbuck | 790 | | |
| Labour | Reginald Price | 423 | | |
| Turnout | | 2,260 | 35 | |

St. Stephen (2)
| Party | Candidate | Votes | % | ±% |
|---|---|---|---|---|
| Conservative | Stephen Inamn | 832 | | |
| Conservative | Gareth Jones | 816 | | |
| Liberal Democrats | Hilary Craig | 349 | | |
| Liberal Democrats | Celia Foulger | 323 | | |
| Labour | George Squires | 311 | | |
| Turnout | | 2,631 | 37 | |

Warndon (2)
| Party | Candidate | Votes | % | ±% |
|---|---|---|---|---|
| Labour | Pamela Clayton | 670 | | |
| Labour | Josephine Hodges | 586 | | |
| Conservative | Colin Bruton | 307 | | |
| Conservative | Martin Hudson | 281 | | |
| Turnout | | 1,844 | 26 | |

Warndon Parish North (2)
| Party | Candidate | Votes | % | ±% |
|---|---|---|---|---|
| Conservative | Martin Clarke | 667 | | |
| Conservative | Stephen Hudgson | 592 | | |
| Labour | John Buckley | 518 | | |
| Liberal Democrats | Edward Hartley | 311 | | |
| Labour | Colin Layland | 292 | | |
| Turnout | | 2,380 | 34 | |

Warndon Parish South (2)
| Party | Candidate | Votes | % | ±% |
|---|---|---|---|---|
| Conservative | Lucy Hodgson | 933 | | |
| Conservative | Rodney Staines | 895 | | |
| Labour | Richard Udall | 372 | | |
| Turnout | | 2,200 | 34 | |
