= 2004 Rossendale Borough Council election =

2004 UK local government election

Elections to Rossendale Borough Council were held on 10 June 2004. One third of the council was up for election and the Conservative party gained overall control of the council from no overall control.

After the election, the composition of the council was

- Conservative 25
- Labour 9
- Liberal Democrat 1
- Independent 1

== Election result ==
Rossendale local election result 2004
Party	Seats	Gains	Losses	Net gain/loss	Seats %	Votes %	Votes	+/−
Conservative	12	8	0	+8	100.0	50.9	10,143	+0.1%
Labour	0	0	8	-8	0	39.5	7,861	+0.0%
Liberal Democrats	0	0	0	0	0	9.6	1,913	-0.2%

== Ward results ==
Cribden
Party	Candidate	Votes	%	±%
Conservative	Janet Graham	681	53.8	+21.6
Labour	Lawrence Forshaw	585	46.2	+13.0
Majority		96	7.6	
Turnout		1,266	48.1	+17.7
Conservative gain from Labour		Swing		

Eden
Party	Candidate	Votes	%	±%
Conservative	Barbara Marriott	802	59.4	
Labour	Donald Rishton	549	40.6	
Majority		253	18.8	
Turnout		1,351	50.0	
Conservative gain from Labour		Swing		

Facit and Shawforth
Party	Candidate	Votes	%	±%
Conservative	Lynda Barnes	660	55.3	+2.2
Labour	Thomas Aldred	533	44.7	−2.2
Majority		127	10.6	+4.4
Turnout		1,193	45.9	+17.7
Conservative gain from Labour		Swing		

Goodshaw
Party	Candidate	Votes	%	±%
Conservative	Michael Ormerod	713	50.8	
Labour	Denise Hancock	690	49.2	
Majority		23	1.6	
Turnout		1,403	48.1	
Conservative gain from Labour		Swing		

Greenfield
Party	Candidate	Votes	%	±%
Conservative	Gladys Sandiford	830	41.1	
Liberal Democrats	Catherine Pilling	754	37.4	
Labour	Frances Whitehead	434	21.5	
Majority		76	3.7	
Turnout		2,018	49.0	+15.4
Conservative hold		Swing		

Greensclough
Party	Candidate	Votes	%	±%
Conservative	Judith Driver	699	37.3	−18.4
Liberal Democrats	Michael Carr	659	35.1	+35.1
Labour	Bernadette O'Connor	518	27.6	−16.7
Majority		40	2.2	−9.2
Turnout		1,876	45.0	+14.6
Conservative hold		Swing		

Hareholme
Party	Candidate	Votes	%	±%
Conservative	Christopher Wadsworth	1,082	56.1	+6.5
Labour	Graham Pearson	848	43.9	−6.5
Majority		234	12.2	
Turnout		1,930	47.3	+16.0
Conservative gain from Labour		Swing		

Helmshore
Party	Candidate	Votes	%	±%
Conservative	Joyce Pawson	1,084	48.9	−0.3
Labour	Stuart Haines	633	28.6	−4.9
Liberal Democrats	James Pilling	500	22.6	+5.3
Majority		451	20.3	+4.6
Turnout		2,217	50.1	+18.2
Conservative hold		Swing		

Irwell
Party	Candidate	Votes	%	±%
Conservative	Janet Farquharson	746	54.6	−3.0
Labour	Tina Durkin	620	45.4	+3.0
Majority		126	9.2	−6.0
Turnout		1,366	39.3	+11.8
Conservative hold		Swing		

Longholme
Party	Candidate	Votes	%	±%
Conservative	Leonard Entwistle	1,024	55.3	+4.9
Labour	John Pilling	829	44.7	−4.9
Majority		195	10.6	+9.8
Turnout		1,853	33.9	+6.4
Conservative gain from Labour		Swing		

Whitewell
Party	Candidate	Votes	%	±%
Conservative	Theresa Crosta	976	54.9	+5.7
Labour	William Riley	803	45.1	−5.7
Majority		173	9.8	
Turnout		1,779	44.4	+14.2
Conservative gain from Labour		Swing		

Worsley
Party	Candidate	Votes	%	±%
Conservative	Duncan Ruddick	846	50.8	+4.1
Labour	Marilyn Procter	819	49.2	+15.6
Majority		27	1.6	−11.7
Turnout		1,665	40.8	+13.1
Conservative gain from Labour		Swing		
