= 2004 European Parliament election in Veneto =

The European Parliament election of 2004 took place on 12–13 June 2004.

The Olive Tree was the most voted list in Veneto with 26.7%, followed by Forza Italia (24.1%) and Liga Veneta–Lega Nord (14.1%).

== Results ==
| Party | votes | votes (%) |
|---|---|---|
| The Olive Tree: Democracy is Freedom – The Daisy; Democrats of the Left; Italian Democratic Socialists; European Republicans Movement | 734,858 | 26.7 |
| Forza Italia | 677,524 | 24.6 |
| Lega Nord | 389,440 | 14.1 |
| National Alliance | 247,063 | 9.0 |
| Union of Christian and Centre Democrats | 139,140 | 5.0 |
| Communist Refoundation Party | 108,562 | 3.9 |
| Federation of the Greens | 77,819 | 2.8 |
| Bonino List | 77,065 | 2.8 |
| Italy of Values–Civil Society–Occhetto | 58,118 | 2.1 |
| Party of Italian Communists | 43,122 | 1.6 |
| United Socialists for Europe | 39,007 | 1.4 |
| Social Alternative | 34,671 | 1.3 |
| Pensioners' Party | 34,656 | 1.3 |
| Others | 94,611 | 3.4 |
| Total | 2,755,656 | 100.0 |

Source: Regional Council of Veneto
