= 2004 United States Senate election in Arizona =

- November 2, 2004
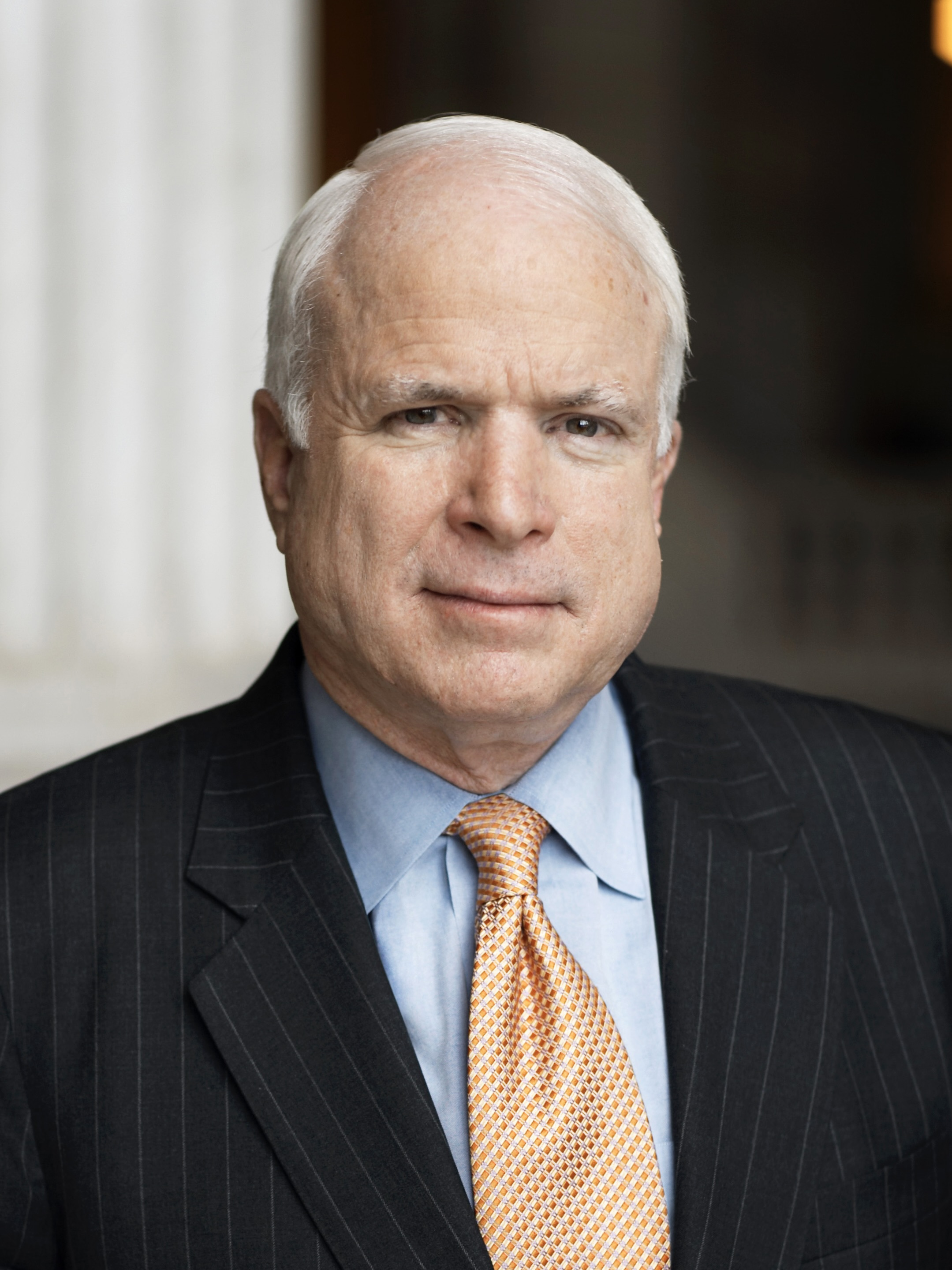

Nominee	John McCain	Stuart Starky
Party	Republican	Democratic
Popular vote	1,505,372	404,507
Percentage	76.74%	20.62%
- County results McCain: 50–60% 60–70% 70–80%
U.S. senator before election
John McCain
Republican
Elected U.S. Senator
John McCain
Republican

The 2004 United States Senate election in Arizona took place on November 2, 2004, alongside other elections to the United States Senate in other states as well as elections to the United States House of Representatives and various state and local elections. Incumbent Republican U.S. Senator John McCain won re-election to a fourth term with his largest victory as a U.S. senator. As of 2026, this was the last time the counties of Apache and Santa Cruz voted for the Republican candidate.

== General election ==
=== Candidates ===
- Ernest Hancock (Libertarian)
- John McCain, incumbent U.S. Senator (Republican)
- Stuart Starky, teacher (Democratic)

=== Campaign ===
Since 1998, McCain had an eventful third term. He challenged Texas Governor George W. Bush in the Presidential primary and despite winning the New Hampshire primary, he lost the nomination. Solidifying his image as a maverick, he voted against the Bush tax cuts. He supported limits on stem cell research. He had a lopsided favorable ratings of 39% to 9% unfavorable in the most recent The New York Times/CBS News poll.

Stuart Starky, an eighth-grade teacher in South Phoenix, was widely known as a long-shot challenger. Starky stated that "I truly believe he's going to run for president again." Starky was called by The Arizona Republic a "sacrificial lamb" put on the ballot because there were no chances to beat McCain. During his campaign, he debated McCain twice, once in Tucson and once in Flagstaff. He was also featured on the cover of Teacher Magazine, dubbed the "Unsinkable Stu Starky." Starky was defeated in a landslide. Despite the relatively low percentage, he gained the highest vote per dollar amount in the country, spending only about $15,000 for his campaign (Starky's campaign may have been aided by John Kerry running for president).

- Complete video of debate, October 15, 2004

=== Predictions ===
Source	Ranking	As of
Sabato's Crystal Ball	Safe R	November 1, 2004

== Results ==
General election results
Party	Candidate	Votes	%	±%
Republican	John McCain (incumbent)	1,505,372	76.74%	+8.00%
Democratic	Stuart Starky	404,507	20.62%	−6.54%
Libertarian	Ernest Hancock	51,798	2.64%	+0.37%
Majority		1,100,865	56.12%	+14.54%
Turnout		1,961,677		
Republican hold		Swing		

=== By county ===
County	Starky #	Starky %	Hancock #	Hancock %	McCain #	McCain %	Total
Apache	9,588	41.0%	905	3.9%	12,923	55.2%	23,416
Cochise	9,555	21.8%	1,394	3.2%	32,879	75.0%	43,828
Coconino	13,520	26.6%	1,504	3.0%	35,849	70.5%	50,873
Gila	4,291	21.0%	632	3.1%	15,551	76.0%	20,474
Graham	2,000	19.1%	322	3.1%	8,171	77.9%	10,493
Greenlee	746	25.0%	68	2.3%	2,166	72.7%	2,980
La Paz	965	19.5%	156	3.2%	3,826	77.3%	4,947
Maricopa	216,124	18.6%	29,769	2.6%	917,527	78.7%	1,163,420
Mohave	10,423	18.4%	1,686	3.0%	44,402	78.6%	56,511
Navajo	7,434	23.4%	1,222	3.9%	23,091	72.7%	31,747
Pima	89,483	25.2%	7,980	2.2%	258,010	72.6%	355,473
Pinal	13,595	21.5%	1,692	2.7%	48,094	75.9%	63,381
Santa Cruz	3,583	31.6%	252	2.2%	7,502	66.2%	11,337
Yavapai	14,852	17.4%	3,160	3.7%	67,312	78.9%	85,324
Yuma	8,348	22.3%	1,056	2.8%	28,069	74.9%	37,473
Arizona	404,507	20.6%	51,798	2.6%	1,505,372	76.7%	1,961,677

== See also ==
- 2004 United States Senate elections
