= 2004 Alabama elections =

Elections were held in the U.S. state of Alabama on November 2, 2004.
