= 2004 South Lakeland District Council election =

2004 UK local government election

Results of the 2004 South Lakeland District Council election

The 2004 South Lakeland District Council election took place on 10 June 2004 to elect members of South Lakeland District Council in Cumbria, England. One third of the council was up for election and the council stayed under no overall control.

After the election, the composition of the council was

- Liberal Democrat 22
- Conservative 20
- Labour 8
- Independent 2

== Campaign ==
Before the election the Liberal Democrats had 22 seats, the Conservatives 18, Labour 8 and independents 2, with a further 2 seats being vacant. The 2 vacant seats were in Milnthorpe, after the resignation of the Liberal Democrat councillor Malcolm Alston, and Ulverston East, following the death of Labour councillor Bob Bolton. 18 seats were being contested in the 2004 election, with 6 of them being in Ulverston. Apart from the 2 vacant seats, the Conservatives defended 7 seats, the Liberal Democrats 6, Labour 2 and 1 independent.

Issues for the 3 parties represented on the council included the council tax, improving facilities, attracting more businesses to the area, street cleaning and plans to upgrade the Furness Line and create an A590 bypass. There was controversy at the election over the decision of the Liberal Democrat parliamentary candidate for Westmorland and Lonsdale Tim Farron to stand in the election for Milnthorpe. The Conservatives attacked the decision saying it was an indication the Liberal Democrats would not win the parliamentary seat, but Tim Farron said there would be no problem with him doing both roles.

The election in South Lakeland, along with all of North West England, had a trial of all postal voting.

== Election result ==
The results saw no party win a majority, but the Conservatives made 2 gains. They took Grange-over-Sands from the Liberal Democrats by 1,129 votes to 1,054 and gained Ulverston Central from Labour by 263 votes to 226. Successful candidates included the Conservative leader of the council Colin Hodgson and the Liberal Democrat parliamentary candidate Tim Farron. Overall turnout in the election was 55.88%.

South Lakeland local election result 2004
| Party | Seats | Gains | Losses | Net gain/loss | Seats % | Votes % | Votes | +/− |
|---|---|---|---|---|---|---|---|---|
| Conservative | 9 | 2 | 0 | +2 | 50.0 | 47.3 | 9,021 | -2.4% |
| Liberal Democrats | 6 | 0 | 1 | -1 | 33.3 | 37.6 | 7,169 | -6.1% |
| Labour | 2 | 0 | 1 | -1 | 11.1 | 7.0 | 1,340 | +5.8% |
| Independent | 1 | 0 | 0 | 0 | 5.6 | 5.8 | 1,103 | +0.4% |
| Green | 0 | 0 | 0 | 0 | 0 | 1.7 | 316 | +1.7% |
| UKIP | 0 | 0 | 0 | 0 | 0 | 0.7 | 137 | +0.7% |

== Ward results ==
Arnside and Beetham
| Party | Candidate | Votes | % | ±% |
|---|---|---|---|---|
| Liberal Democrats | Ian Stewart* | 1,133 | 51.9 | −4.0 |
| Conservative | David Clark | 1,051 | 48.1 | +4.0 |
| Majority | | 82 | 3.8 | −8.0 |
| Turnout | | 2,184 | 61.4 | +12.4 |
| Liberal Democrats hold | | Swing | | |

Burton and Holme
| Party | Candidate | Votes | % | ±% |
|---|---|---|---|---|
| Conservative | Roger Bingham* | 923 | 75.0 | −7.4 |
| Liberal Democrats | Antony Jolley | 308 | 25.0 | +7.4 |
| Majority | | 615 | 50.0 | −14.8 |
| Turnout | | 1,231 | 56.3 | +10.5 |
| Conservative hold | | Swing | | |

Coniston
| Party | Candidate | Votes | % | ±% |
|---|---|---|---|---|
| Conservative | Doreen Hall* | 557 | 59.8 | +3.8 |
| Liberal Democrats | John Hemingway | 375 | 40.2 | −3.8 |
| Majority | | 182 | 19.6 | +7.6 |
| Turnout | | 932 | 63.2 | +7.6 |
| Conservative hold | | Swing | | |

Grange
| Party | Candidate | Votes | % | ±% |
|---|---|---|---|---|
| Conservative | William Wearing | 1,129 | 48.4 | +11.3 |
| Liberal Democrats | Robert Leach* | 1,054 | 45.1 | −17.8 |
| Independent | Anthony Coles | 152 | 6.5 | N/A |
| Majority | | 75 | 3.3 | |
| Turnout | | 2,335 | 63.9 | +19.0 |
| Conservative gain from Liberal Democrats | | Swing | | |

Hawkshead
| Party | Candidate | Votes | % | ±% |
|---|---|---|---|---|
| Liberal Democrats | Gordon Jenkinson* | 404 | 52.5 | +2.4 |
| Conservative | Richard Lancaster | 366 | 47.5 | −2.4 |
| Majority | | 38 | 5.0 | +4.8 |
| Turnout | | 770 | 57.1 | +13.3 |
| Liberal Democrats hold | | Swing | | |

Levens
| Party | Candidate | Votes | % | ±% |
|---|---|---|---|---|
| Liberal Democrats | Brenda Woof* | 684 | 70.2 | +13.6 |
| Conservative | Melvin Mackie | 290 | 29.8 | −13.6 |
| Majority | | 394 | 40.4 | +27.2 |
| Turnout | | 974 | 66.0 | +12.0 |
| Liberal Democrats hold | | Swing | | |

Low Furness and Swarthmoor
| Party | Candidate | Votes | % | ±% |
|---|---|---|---|---|
| Independent | David Foot* | 863 | 50.2 | −1.5 |
| Conservative | Janice Bell | 491 | 28.6 | −19.7 |
| Liberal Democrats | Lawson Short | 365 | 21.2 | N/A |
| Majority | | 372 | 21.6 | +18.2 |
| Turnout | | 1,719 | 49.9 | +10.9 |
| Independent hold | | Swing | | |

Lyth Valley
| Party | Candidate | Votes | % | ±% |
|---|---|---|---|---|
| Conservative | Robin Brown | 605 | 65.3 | +4.1 |
| Liberal Democrats | Margaret Smith | 322 | 34.7 | −4.1 |
| Majority | | 283 | 30.6 | +8.2 |
| Turnout | | 927 | 55.8 | +16.2 |
| Conservative hold | | Swing | | |

Milnthorpe
| Party | Candidate | Votes | % | ±% |
|---|---|---|---|---|
| Liberal Democrats | Timothy Farron | 723 | 66.6 | −11.2 |
| Conservative | Andrew Coates | 274 | 25.2 | +3.0 |
| Labour | David Ryder | 89 | 8.2 | N/A |
| Majority | | 449 | 41.4 | −14.2 |
| Turnout | | 1,086 | 64.2 | +29.0 |
| Liberal Democrats hold | | Swing | | |

Natland
| Party | Candidate | Votes | % | ±% |
|---|---|---|---|---|
| Liberal Democrats | Brenda Gray | 605 | 56.5 | +1.2 |
| Conservative | Enid Robinson** | 465 | 43.5 | −1.2 |
| Majority | | 140 | 13.0 | +2.4 |
| Turnout | | 1,070 | 65.7 | +11.9 |
| Liberal Democrats hold | | Swing | | |

- Enid Robinson was a sitting councillor for the Lyth Valley ward.

Staveley-in-Cartmel
| Party | Candidate | Votes | % | ±% |
|---|---|---|---|---|
| Conservative | Michael Bentley* | 425 | 48.4 | −4.7 |
| Liberal Democrats | Ronald Mein | 365 | 41.6 | −5.3 |
| Independent | Edward Walsh | 88 | 10.0 | N/A |
| Majority | | 60 | 6.8 | +0.6 |
| Turnout | | 878 | 58.3 | +15.4 |
| Conservative hold | | Swing | | |

Staveley-in-Westmorland
| Party | Candidate | Votes | % | ±% |
|---|---|---|---|---|
| Liberal Democrats | Stanley Collins* | 679 | 71.2 | −7.6 |
| Conservative | George Richardson | 275 | 28.8 | +7.6 |
| Majority | | 404 | 42.4 | −15.2 |
| Turnout | | 954 | 56.5 | +13.3 |
| Liberal Democrats hold | | Swing | | |

Ulverston Central
| Party | Candidate | Votes | % | ±% |
|---|---|---|---|---|
| Conservative | Norman Bishop-Rowe | 263 | 41.0 | +2.6 |
| Labour | David Miller* | 226 | 35.3 | −26.3 |
| Liberal Democrats | Peter Metcalfe | 152 | 23.7 | N/A |
| Majority | | 37 | 5.7 | |
| Turnout | | 641 | 42.4 | +10.5 |
| Conservative gain from Labour | | Swing | | |

Ulverston East
| Party | Candidate | Votes | % | ±% |
|---|---|---|---|---|
| Labour | Philip Lister** | 281 | 59.0 | −18.1 |
| Conservative | Peter Hornby | 195 | 41.0 | +18.1 |
| Majority | | 86 | 18.0 | −36.2 |
| Turnout | | 476 | 34.0 | +5.8 |
| Labour hold | | Swing | | |

- Philip Lister was a sitting councillor for the Ulverston Town ward.

Ulverston North
| Party | Candidate | Votes | % | ±% |
|---|---|---|---|---|
| Conservative | Colin Hodgson* | 434 | 57.9 | −10.8 |
| Green | Karen Stack | 316 | 42.1 | N/A |
| Majority | | 118 | 15.8 | −21.6 |
| Turnout | | 750 | 52.8 | +15.3 |
| Conservative hold | | Swing | | |

Ulverston South
| Party | Candidate | Votes | % | ±% |
|---|---|---|---|---|
| Conservative | Alfred Jarvis* | 437 | 66.3 | +4.0 |
| Labour | Bhareth Rajan | 222 | 33.7 | −4.0 |
| Majority | | 215 | 32.6 | +8.0 |
| Turnout | | 659 | 48.1 | +16.1 |
| Conservative hold | | Swing | | |

Ulverston Town
| Party | Candidate | Votes | % | ±% |
|---|---|---|---|---|
| Labour | Graham Donning | 301 | 47.4 | −27.1 |
| Conservative | George Bell | 200 | 31.5 | +6.0 |
| UKIP | Alan Beach | 134 | 21.1 | N/A |
| Majority | | 101 | 15.9 | −33.1 |
| Turnout | | 635 | 42.7 | −0.2 |
| Labour hold | | Swing | | |

Ulverston West
| Party | Candidate | Votes | % | ±% |
|---|---|---|---|---|
| Conservative | Janette Jenkinson* | 641 | 74.4 | −3.5 |
| Labour | Fay Plant | 221 | 25.6 | +3.5 |
| Majority | | 420 | 48.8 | −7.0 |
| Turnout | | 862 | 52.6 | +20.1 |
| Conservative hold | | Swing | | |
