= 2004 Bakersfield, California, mayoral election =

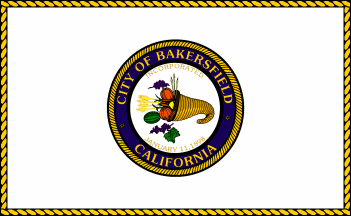
- March 2, 2004
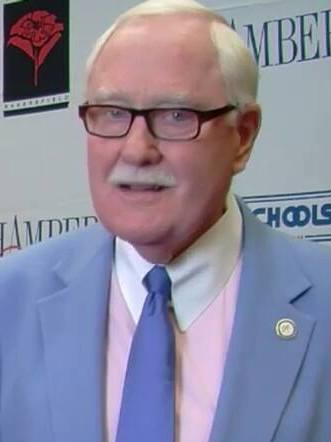

Candidate	Harvey Hall	Robert Russo
Party	Republican	Nonpartisan
Popular vote	25,686	19,989
Percentage	56.1%	43.6%
Mayor before election
Harvey Hall
Republican
Elected mayor
Harvey Hall
Republican

Bakersfield, California, held a general election for mayor on March 2, 2004. It saw the reelection of incumbent mayor Harvey Hall.

The election coincided with the California presidential primaries. Since Hall obtained a majority in the initial round of voting, no runoff was necessitated.

== Results ==
Results
Candidate	Votes	%
Harvey L. Hall (incumbent)	25,686	56.11
Robert Russo	19,989	43.67
Total votes	45,776	
