= 2004 Poitou-Charentes regional election =

A regional election took place in Poitou-Charentes on March 21 and March 28, 2004, along with all other regions. Ségolène Royal (PS) was elected president, defeating incumbent Élisabeth Morin (UMP).

Candidate	Party	Votes (Round One)	% (Round One)	Votes (Round Two)	% (Round Two)
Ségolène Royal	PS-PRG-PCF-Verts	350,466	46.29%	448,950	55.10%
Élisabeth Morin	UMP-UDF-MPF	249,373	32.93%	294,959	36.20%
Jean-Romée Charbonneau	FN	79,484	10.50%	70,898	8.70%
Gérard Fontenay	CPNT	43,645	5.76%	-	-
Claude Quemar	LO/LCR	34,221	4.52%	-	-
Total		757,189	100.00%	814,807	100.00%
