= 2004 Washington elections =

2004 Washington Statewide Executive Offices elections
- November 2, 2004

All 9 Statewide Executive Offices
	Majority party	Minority party
Party	Democratic	Republican
Last election	7	2
Seats won	6	3
Seat change	▼1	▲1
Percentage	56.82%	39.66%

Washington has 9 Executive seats, all elected at large. In 2004, all 9 positions were up for reelection.

== Governor ==
After a machine and manual recount, Christine Gregoire won the election by 133 votes.

Washington gubernatorial election, 2004
Party	Candidate	Votes	%
Democratic	Christine Gregoire (incumbent)	1,373,361	48.8731
Republican	Dino Rossi	1,373,228	48.8684
Libertarian	Ruth Bennett	63,464	2.2585
Total votes		2,810,053	100.00
Turnout			

== Lt. Governor ==
Washington State Lt. Governor election, 2004
Party	Candidate	Votes	%
Democratic	Brad Owen (incumbent)	1,443,505	54.39
Republican	Jim Wiest	1,019,790	38.43
Libertarian	Jocelyn A Langlois	117,147	4.41
Green	Bern Haggerty	73,328	2.76
Total votes		2,653,770	100.00
Turnout			

== Secretary of State ==
Washington Secretary of State election, 2004
Party	Candidate	Votes	%
Republican	Sam Reed (incumbent)	1,369,421	51.47
Democratic	Laura Ruderman	1,209,299	45.45
Libertarian	Jacqueline Passey	82,097	3.09
Total votes		2,660,817	100.00
Turnout			

== State Treasurer ==
Washington State Treasurer election, 2004
Party	Candidate	Votes	%
Democratic	Mike Murphy (incumbent)	1,575,499	60.29
Republican	Oscar S. Lewis	941,754	36.04
Libertarian	John Sample	96,144	3.68
Total votes		2,613,397	100.00
Turnout			

== State Auditor ==
Washington State Auditor election, 2004
Party	Candidate	Votes	%
Democratic	Brian Sonntag (incumbent)	1,668,575	63.89
Republican	Will Baker	841,772	32.23
Libertarian	Jason G. Bush	101,161	3.87
Total votes		2,611,508	100.00
Turnout			

== Attorney General ==
=== Results ===
Washington State Attorney General election, 2004
Party	Candidate	Votes	%
Republican	Rob McKenna	1,425,368	52.98
Democratic	Deborah Senn	1,163,964	43.27
Libertarian	J. Bradley Gibson	56,792	2.11
Green	Paul Richmond	44,020	1.64
Total votes		2,690,144	100.00
Turnout			

== Commissioner of Public Lands ==
Washington State Commissioner of Public Lands election, 2004
Party	Candidate	Votes	%
Republican	Doug Sutherland (incumbent)	1,309,441	49.96
Democratic	Mike Cooper	1,223,207	46.67
Libertarian	Steve Layman	88,171	3.36
Total votes		2,620,819	100.00
Turnout			

== Superintendent of Public Instruction ==
Washington State Superintendent of Public Instruction election, 2004
Party	Candidate	Votes	%
Washington Non Partisan	Terry Bergeson (incumbent)	1,293,560	55.51
Washington Non Partisan	Judith Billings	1,036,912	44.49
Total votes		2,330,472	100.00
Turnout			

== Insurance Commissioner ==
Washington State Insurance Commissioner election, 2004
Party	Candidate	Votes	%
Democratic	Mike Kreidler (incumbent)	1,393,764	54.45
Republican	John Adams	1,058,583	41.36
Libertarian	Stephen D. Steele	107,295	4.19
Total votes		2,559,642	100.00
Turnout			

== See also ==
- 2004 Washington gubernatorial election
