= 2004–2006 Montenegrin municipal elections =

2004-2006 Montenegrin municipal elections
- June 2004 - September 2006
Party	DPS	SNP	DUA
Mayors	14 / 21	6 / 21	1 / 21
Mayors +/-	▲8	▼3	Steady
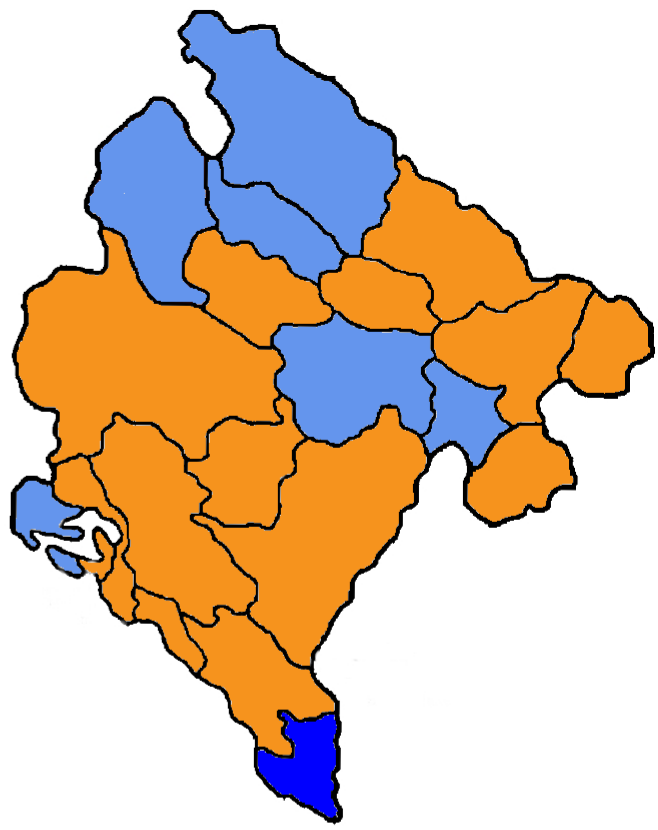
- Mayoral seats

Montenegrin municipal elections were held in all 21 municipalities, between June 2004 and October 2006. It resulted in the victory of the ruling DPS-SDP coalition in 15 out of 21 municipalities, where they secured a majority, alone or in a coalition with national minority parties.

== Results ==
=== Herceg Novi ===
Mayoral

Round One

- Registered voters: 23,490
- Votes: 14,750
  - Valid votes: 11,660 (97.9%)
  - Invalid votes: 255 (2.1%)
- Turnout: 62.8%
1. Stanko Zloković - 5,931 (41.3%)
2. Dejan Mandić - 5,326 (37.1%)
3. Vasilije Ilić - 1,201 (8.4%)
4. Savo Zarubica - 593 (4.1%)
5. Nada Setenčić - 489 (3.4%)
6. Helena Vučetić - 405 (2.8%)
7. Olivera Doklestić - 405 (2.8%)

Round Two

- Registered voters: 23,490
- Votes: 15,952
  - Valid votes: 15,694 (98.4%)
- Turnout: 67.9%
1. Dejan Mandić - 8,402 (53.5%)
2. Stanko Zloković - 7,292 (46.5%)

Parliamentary

- Registered voters: 23,437
- Votes: 14,713
  - Valid votes: 14,203 (96.6%)
  - Invalid votes: 510 (3.4%)
- Turnout: 62.68%

Party	Votes	%	Seats
SNP - SNS - SRS, "Together for Herceg Novi, Our Town" (СНП - СНС - СРС, "Заједно за Херцег Нови, наш град")	5,519	38.9%	15
"DPS-SDP for Herceg Novi" ("ДПС-СДП за Херцег Нови")	4,093	28.8%	11
"People's Party - Dr Vasilije Ilić" ("Народна странка - др Василије Илић")	1,145	8.1%	3
Democratic Serb Party - Dr Božidar Bojović and Dr Nada Setenčić (Демократска српска странка - др Божидар Бојовић и др Нада Сетенчић)	701	4.9%	2
"A Recognizable Herceg Novi - Savo Zarubica" ("Препознатљив Херцег Нови - Саво Зарубица")	642	4.5%	1
"New People for Our Novi" Liberal Alliance of Montenegro ("Нови људи за наш Нови" Либерални савез Црне Горе)	612	4.3%	1
Civic Party - "Herceg Novi to Citizens" (Грађанска партија - "Херцег Нови грађанима")	602	4.2%	1
Democratic Party of Montenegro Herceg Novi (Демократска странка Црне Горе Херцег Нови)	519	3.7%	1
Labour Party of Montenegro (Лабуристичка партија Црне Горе)	198	1.4%	0
NSS of Montenegro "For a Herceg Novi with Heart and Mind" (НСС Црне Горе "За Херцег Нови са срцем и разумом")	172	1.2%	0

=== Kotor ===
Mayoral

Round One

- Registered voters: 17,301
- Votes: 10,793
  - Valid votes: 10,396 (96.3%)
  - Invalid votes: 396 (3.7%)
- Turnout: 62.4%
1. Marija Ćatović - 4,464 (42.9%)
2. Branko Ivanović - 3,583 (34.5%)
3. Andrija Popović- 1,331 (12.8%)
4. Emil Kriještorac - 556 (5.3%)
5. Dragica Perović - 462 (4.4%)

Round Two

- Registered voters: 17,301
- Votes: 10,259
  - Valid votes: 10,010 (97.6%)
  - Invalid votes: 249 (2.4%)
- Turnout: 59.3%
1. Marija Ćatović - 5,218 (52.1%)
2. Branko Ivanović - 4,792 (47.9%)

Parliamentary

- Registered voters: 17,301
- Votes: 10,793
  - Valid votes: 10,323 (95.6%)
  - Invalid votes: 470 (4.4%)
- Turnout: 62.4%

Party	Votes	%	Seats
Democratic Party of Socialists-Social Democratic Party	3,711	35.9%	14
Socialist People's Party	2,611	25.3%	9
Liberal Party	1,010	9.8%	3
Croatian Civic Initiative	643	6.2%	2
Serb People's Party	619	6%	2
People's Party	590	5.7%	2
Democratic Serb Party	446	4.3%	1
Civic Party	282	2.7%	0
Liberal Alliance	221	2.1%	0
Serbian Radical Party "Vojislav Šešelj"	180	1.7%	0

=== Tivat ===
Mayoral

Round One

- Registered voters: 10,495
- Votes: 6,062
  - Valid votes: 5,870 (96.8%)
  - Invalid votes: 175 (2.9%)
- Turnout: 57.8%
1. Miodrag Kankaraš - 2,378 (40.5%)
2. Lj. Samardžić - 1,725 (29.4%)
3. Z. Petković - 1,305 (22.2%)
4. V. Kovačević - 361 (6.1%)
5. Radoš Gospić - 118 (2%)

Round Two

- Registered voters: 10,495
- Votes: 6,031
  - Valid votes: 5,834 (96.7%)
  - Invalid votes: 197 (3.3%)
- Turnout: 57.5%
1. Miodrag Kankaraš - 3,158 (54.1%)
2. Lj. Samardžić - 2,676 (45.9%)

Parliamentary

- Registered voters: 10,495
- Votes: 6,062
  - Valid votes: 5,861 (96.7%)
  - Invalid votes: 201 (3.3%)
- Turnout: 57.8%

Party	Votes	%	Seats
DPS, SDP and DPZSCG - For a European Tivat (ДПС, СДП и ДПЗСЦГ - За европски Тиват)	1,962	33.48%	11
We Can, Tivat Wants - SNP, SNS (Мо можемо, Тиват хоће - СНП, СНС)	1,347	22.98%	8
Croatian Civic Initiative (Хрватска грађанска иницијатива)	1,045	17.8%	6
Tivat Liberals - What else! (Тиватски Либерали - Него што!)	458	7.81%	2
Democratic Serb Party (Демократска српска странка)	410	7%	2
People's Party (Народна странка)	341	5.82%	2
Serbian Radical Party Dr Vojislav Šešelj (Српска радикална странка др Војислав Шешељ)	183	3.12%	1
Civic Group Mr Radoš Gospić (Грађанска група мр Радош Госпић)	83	1.42%	0
NSS CG (НСС ЦГ)	32	0.5%	0

=== Žabljak ===
- Registered voters: 3,405
- Votes: 2,892
  - Valid votes: 2,785 (96.3%)
  - Invalid votes: 107 (3.7%)
- Turnout: 84.9%

Party	Votes	%	Seats
Democratic Party of Socialists	1,158	41.6%	14
Socialist People's Party-People's Socialist Party-Serbian Radical Party	791	28.4%	10
Democratic Serb Party	293	10.5%	3
People's Party	231	8.3%	2
Serb People's Party	141	5.1%	1
Social Democratic Party	141	5.1%	1
Liberal Alliance	30	1.1%	0

=== Results in rest of municipalities ===
In seventeen other municipalities ruling Coalition for European Montenegro (DPS, SDP and HGI) win the power in most municipalities. It seize majority in Podgorica, Nikšić, Rožaje, Bijelo Polje, Budva, Bar, Danilovgrad, Mojkovac, Cetinje, Plav, Berane and Šavnik as well in Ulcinj where they form an post-election coalition with Democratic Union of Albanians to form local government. While the main opposition coalition Together for Change (SNP-SNS-NS-DSS) has secured the majority and forms the local government in Pljevlja, Plužine, Andrijevica and Kolašin municipalities.
