= 2004 European Parliament election in Piedmont =

The European Parliament election of 2004 took place on 12–13 June 2004.

The Olive Tree was the most voted list in Piedmont with 29.0%, followed by Forza Italia (22.1%).

== Results ==
Party	votes	votes (%)
The Olive Tree: Democracy is Freedom – The Daisy; Democrats of the Left; Italian Democratic Socialists; European Republicans Movement	719,445	29.0
Forza Italia	549,250	22.1
National Alliance	218,597	8.8
Lega Nord	202,925	8.2
Communist Refoundation Party	162,987	6.6
Union of Christian and Centre Democrats	124,468	5.0
Bonino List	77,707	3.1
Party of Italian Communists	71,827	2.9
Federation of the Greens	59,856	2.4
Italy of Values–Civil Society–Occhetto	59,647	2.4
United Socialists for Europe	44,194	1.8
Pensioners' Party	37,930	1.5
Social Alternative	25,076	1.0
Others	126,591	5.1
Total	2,480,500	100.0

Source: Ministry of the Interior
