= 2004 Provence-Alpes-Côte d'Azur regional election =

| ← 1998 | 21 March and 28 March 2004 | 2010 → |

All 123 seats to the Provence-Alpes-Côte d'Azur Regional Council
| | First party | Second party | Third party |
|---|---|---|---|
| Leader | Michel Vauzelle | Renaud Muselier | Guy Macary |
| Party | PS | UMP | FN |
| Seats won | 73 | 31 | 19 |
| Popular vote | 881 350 | 659 592 | 409 786 |
| Percentage | 45,18% | 33,81% | 21,01% |
President before election
Jean-Claude Gaudin
UMP
Elected President
Michel Vauzelle
PS

A regional election took place in Provence-Alpes-Côte d'Azur on March 21 and March 28, 2004, along with all other regions. Michel Vauzelle (PS) was elected president.
