= 2004 Hull City Council election =

2004 UK local government election

Map of the results of the 2004 Hull council election. Labour in red, Liberal Democrats in yellow, Conservatives in blue, UKIP in purple, Uncontested in cream.

The 2004 Hull City Council election took place on 10 June 2004 to elect members of Hull City Council in England. One third of the council was up for election and the council stayed under no overall control.

After the election, the composition of the council was:

- Labour 27
- Liberal Democrat 24
- Independent 5
- Conservative 2
- United Kingdom Independence Party 1

== Campaign ==
Before the election the Labour Party formed the administration after becoming the largest party in the 2003 election. Their administration however was criticised by the Audit Commission, which raised the hopes of the Liberal Democrats that they could regain control of the council.

Labour campaigned saying that voters should choose "order and progress" under themselves rather than the chaos they said the Liberal Democrats had brought while they were in office. They hoped to expand their pilot programme of free school meals for all children to all schools within the city. The Liberal Democrats however wanted to abolish the programme and pledged to establish crime prevention funds for neighbourhoods, free off-peak bus travel for pensioners and expand recycling. The Liberal Democrats also pledged to keep council tax increases to the same level as rises in earnings for the 2 years after the election.

20 of the 59 seats on the council were contested in the election, which was conducted with all postal voting in common with councils across 4 of the English regions.

== Election result ==
The results saw the Labour Party remain the largest party on the council with 27 seats but with the Liberal Democrats gaining 2 seats to hold 24 after the election. As a result, the council remained hung with no party having a majority on the council. The most high-profile result saw the United Kingdom Independence Party win their first local council seat after John Cornforth defeated the independent councillor, John Considine, in Derringham ward by 7 votes after 6 recounts. However the independents immediately said that they would mount a legal challenge to the result.

Hull local election result 2004
Party	Seats	Gains	Losses	Net gain/loss	Seats %	Votes %	Votes	+/−
Liberal Democrats	10	2	0	+2	50.0	37.4	21,774	+0.1
Labour	8	1	1	0	40.0	34.3	19,974	-10.5
Conservative	1	0	0	0	5.0	11.2	6,521	+4.0
UKIP	1	1	0	+1	5.0	7.1	4,130	+6.4
Independent	0	0	3	-3	0.0	6.9	4,012	-0.3
BNP	0	0	0	0	0.0	2.0	1,170	+1.1
Green	0	0	0	0	0.0	0.8	492	-0.6
Legalise Cannabis	0	0	0	0	0.0	0.2	109	+0.1

== Legal challenge ==
The independent candidate in Derringham said he would make a legal challenge to the result as the Returning Officer had said 3,540 ballot papers had been returned but that when the results were declared 140 ballot papers were missing. The independents claimed that these missing papers had ended up in counting rooms for other wards. They also said that people in Derringham had received ballots in the post that were intended for Marfleet ward and that no one knew how many people this had affected and were thus unable to vote.

The court challenge was successful with the High Court ruling that the result "may well have been affected". As a result, a new vote was ordered to be held, with the election set for 13 January 2005. The by-election was won by Michael Rouse-Deane of the Liberal Democrats who had come fourth in the original election in Derringham.

== Ward results ==
Avenue
Party	Candidate	Votes	%	±%
Liberal Democrats	John Robinson	1,616	46.6	−11.3
Labour	Andrew Dorton	811	23.4	−4.9
Green	James Russell	492	14.2	+7.0
Conservative	Basil Bulmer	365	10.5	+10.5
Independent	Ginette Andrew	181	5.2	+5.2
Majority		805	23.2	−6.4
Turnout		3,465		
Liberal Democrats hold		Swing		

Beverley
Party	Candidate	Votes	%	±%
Liberal Democrats	Geraldine Gough	1,714	59.5	−1.6
Labour	Daniel Brown	677	23.5	−0.4
Conservative	Andrew Forster	490	17.0	+2.0
Majority		1,037	36.0	−1.2
Turnout		2,881		
Liberal Democrats hold		Swing		

Boothferry
Party	Candidate	Votes	%	±%
Liberal Democrats	Keith Toon	1,575	41.4	−3.1
Labour	Freda Longbottom	1,020	26.8	−13.0
UKIP	Tineke Robinson	660	17.4	+17.4
Conservative	John Sharp	547	14.4	−1.3
Majority		555	14.6	+9.9
Turnout		3,802		
Liberal Democrats hold		Swing		

Bricknell
Party	Candidate	Votes	%	±%
Conservative	Andrew Percy	1,789	60.7	
Labour	Brian Wadworth	626	21.3	
Liberal Democrats	Andrew Sloan	530	18.0	
Majority		1,163	39.4	
Turnout		2,945		
Conservative hold		Swing		

Derringham
Party	Candidate	Votes	%	±%
UKIP	John Cornforth	945	28.5	+15.1
Independent	John Considine	938	28.2	−7.4
Labour	Garry White	856	25.8	−6.9
Liberal Democrats	Michael Rouse-Deane	300	9.0	−0.6
Conservative	Zena Rowley	282	8.5	−0.4
Majority		7	0.3	
Turnout		3,321		
UKIP gain from Independent		Swing		

Drypool
Party	Candidate	Votes	%	±%
Liberal Democrats	Adam Williams	1,414	40.0	−0.4
Labour	Alan Gardiner	1,118	31.6	−21.6
Independent	Michael Kemp	797	22.6	+22.6
Conservative	John Abbott	204	5.8	−0.6
Majority		296	8.4	
Turnout		3,533		
Liberal Democrats gain from Independent		Swing		

Holderness
Party	Candidate	Votes	%	±%
Liberal Democrats	John Nicholson	2,299	55.1	+9.9
Labour	Rilba Jones	1,352	32.4	−11.8
Conservative	Albert Greendale	518	12.4	+1.8
Majority		947	22.7	+21.7
Turnout		4,169		
Liberal Democrats hold		Swing		

Ings
Party	Candidate	Votes	%	±%
Liberal Democrats	Allen Healand	2,202	51.1	+10.6
Labour	Tracy Holmes	1,531	35.5	−16.2
Conservative	James Parker	330	7.7	−0.2
Independent	John Reeve	250	5.8	+5.8
Majority		671	15.6	
Turnout		4,313		
Liberal Democrats gain from Labour		Swing		

Kings Park
Party	Candidate	Votes	%	±%
Liberal Democrats	Elaine Garland	1,218	55.6	+0.0
Labour	Kathryn Nicholson	451	20.6	−7.6
BNP	Paul Buckley	374	17.1	+17.1
Conservative	Sheila Airey	147	6.7	+2.3
Majority		767	35.0	+7.8
Turnout		2,190		
Liberal Democrats hold		Swing		

Longhill
Party	Candidate	Votes	%	±%
Labour	John Hewitt	1,634	50.5	−13.3
UKIP	Barbara Stark	729	22.5	+22.5
Liberal Democrats	James Morrell	540	16.7	−3.9
Conservative	Patrick Belding	334	10.3	+0.5
Majority		905	28.0	−15.2
Turnout		3,237		
Labour hold		Swing		

Marfleet
Party	Candidate	Votes	%	±%
Labour	Sheila Waudby	1,511	59.7	−15.6
Liberal Democrats	Ann Godden	649	25.6	+0.9
BNP	Alan Siddle	373	14.7	+14.7
Majority		862	34.1	−16.5
Turnout		2,533		
Labour hold		Swing		

Myton
Party	Candidate	Votes	%	±%
Labour	Daren Hale	1,415	51.6	−5.6
Liberal Democrats	Anthony Sloan	478	17.4	−6.9
UKIP	Joanne Robinson	450	16.4	+16.4
Conservative	Alan Winzor	270	9.8	+2.4
Independent	Miriam Benson	129	4.7	−1.7
Majority		937	34.2	+1.3
Turnout		2,742		
Labour hold		Swing		

Newington
Party	Candidate	Votes	%	±%
Labour	Katrina Peat	859	36.5	−16.6
UKIP	Glenn Dickinson	649	27.5	+27.5
Liberal Democrats	Michael Johnson	400	17.0	−20.4
Conservative	David Thompson	239	10.1	+0.6
Independent	Frederick Beedle	209	8.9	+8.9
Majority		210	9.0	−6.7
Turnout		2,356		
Labour hold		Swing		

Newland
Party	Candidate	Votes	%	±%
Liberal Democrats	Michael Ross	1,154	65.3	+20.7
Labour	Philip Morrell	355	20.1	−18.4
Conservative	Robert Brown	148	8.4	+0.3
Legalise Cannabis	Carl Wagner	109	6.2	+3.2
Majority		799	45.2	+39.1
Turnout		1,766		
Liberal Democrats hold		Swing		

Orchard Park and Greenwood
Party	Candidate	Votes	%	±%
Labour	Steven Bayes	1,334	53.5	+1.5
Independent	Tony Fee	754	30.2	+11.8
Liberal Democrats	Angela Simpson	407	16.3	+10.0
Majority		580	23.3	−10.3
Turnout		2,495		
Labour hold		Swing		

Pickering
Party	Candidate	Votes	%	±%
Labour	Pete Allen	1,122	33.8	−11.7
Liberal Democrats	David Harris	1,024	30.8	−3.6
Independent	Barry Dibnah	436	13.1	+2.7
BNP	Edward Scott	423	12.7	+12.7
Conservative	Reginald Britton	319	9.6	+2.1
Majority		98	3.0	−8.1
Turnout		3,324		
Labour gain from Independent		Swing		

Southcoates East
Party	Candidate	Votes	%	±%
Labour	Thomas McVie	961	60.2	
Independent	Harold Neilson	318	19.9	
Liberal Democrats	Danielle Martine	318	19.9	
Majority		643	40.3	
Turnout		1,597		
Labour hold		Swing		

Southcoates West
Party	Candidate	Votes	%	±%
Labour	Mary Glew	914	45.3	
Liberal Democrats	Martin Uzzell	868	43.1	
Conservative	Colin Baxter	234	11.6	
Majority		46	2.2	
Turnout		2,016		
Labour hold		Swing		

St Andrews
Party	Candidate	Votes	%	±%
Liberal Democrats	Albert Penna	839	51.7	
Labour	John Nicholson	399	24.6	
UKIP	Peter Mawer	284	17.5	
Conservative	Robert Cook	100	6.2	
Majority		440	27.1	
Turnout		1,622		
Liberal Democrats hold		Swing		

Sutton
Party	Candidate	Votes	%	±%
Liberal Democrats	Kalvin Neal	2,229	57.5	+11.4
Labour	Anouska Clark	1,028	26.5	−19.6
UKIP	Clare Hammant	413	10.7	+10.7
Conservative	Ian Brown	205	5.3	−2.5
Majority		1,201	31.0	
Turnout		3,875		
Liberal Democrats hold		Swing		

No elections were held in Bransholme East, Bransholme West and University wards.
