= Results of the 2004 Indian general election in Tamil Nadu by constituency =

This is a detailed results of 2004 general election by individual constituents in Tamil Nadu.

== Results by party ==
=== Results by party ===
Party	Alliance	Seats contested	Votes	%	Change	Seats	Change
Bahujan Samaj Party	none	30	167,619	0.58	n/a	0	n/a
Bharatiya Janata Party	National Democratic Alliance	6	1,455,899	5.07	-2.07	0	-4
Communist Party of India	Left Front	2	852,981	2.97	+0.41	2	+2
Communist Party of India (Marxist)	Left Front	2	824,524	2.87	+0.52	2	+1
Indian National Congress	United Progressive Alliance	10	4,134,255	14.40	+3.30	10	+8
All India Anna Dravida Munnetra Kazhagam	National Democratic Alliance	33	8,547,014	29.77	+4.09	0	-10
Communist Party of India (Marxist-Leninist) Liberation	Left Front	3	6,886	0.02	-0.01	0	0
Dravida Munnetra Kazhagam	United Progressive Alliance	16	7,064,393	24.60	+1.47	16	+4
Janata Dal (United)	National Democratic Alliance	20	884,293	3.08	n/a	0	n/a
Marumaralarchi Dravida Munnetra Kazhagam	United Progressive Alliance	4	1,679,870	5.85	-0.10	4	0
Pattali Makkal Katchi	United Progressive Alliance	5	1,927,367	6.71	-1.50	5	0
Rashtriya Lok Dal	none	3	3,985	0.01	n/a	0	n/a
Shiv Sena	National Democratic Alliance	2	5,154	0.02	+0.02	0	0
Samajwadi Party	none	4	6,645	0.02	n/a	0	n/a
Akhil Bharatiya Hindu Mahasabha	none	4	11,568	0.04	n/a	0	n/a
Bharatiya Backward Party	none	2	2,162	0.01	n/a	0	n/a
Jebamani Janata	none	1	734	0.00	n/a	0	n/a
Janata Party	National Democratic Alliance	28	149,646	0.52	n/a	0	n/a
Republican Party of India (Athvale)	United Progressive Alliance	2	9,654	0.03	+0.02	0	0
Tamil Desiyak Katchi	none	2	25,348	0.09	0.00	0	0
Youth and Students Party	none	1	6,580	0.02	n/a	0	n/a
Independents	none	391	947,938	3.30	+2.05	0	0
Total	571	28,714,515	-	-	39	-	

== Results by constituency ==
=== Chennai North ===
- Note: Dravida Munnetra Kazhagam, Marumalarchi Dravida Munnetra Kazhagam, Pattali Makkal Katchi were all part of the National Democratic Alliance, in 1999, but joined the United Progressive Alliance in 2004. So the coalition switches, represent the change in coalition from the 1999 election to 2004 election.

General Election, 2004: Chennai North
Party	Candidate	Votes	%	±%
DMK	C. Kuppusami	570,122	62.25	+9.55
BJP	Sukumar Nambiar M.N.	316,583	34.57	n/a
Majority		253,539	27.68	+9.81
Turnout		915,879	45.77	+1.98
DMK hold		Swing	+9.55	
UPA gain from NDA		Swing		

General Election, 2004: Chennai Central
Party	Candidate	Votes	%	±%
DMK	Dayanidhi Maran	316,329	61.68	+2.68
AIADMK	Balaganga N.	182,151	35.52	−1.32
Majority		134,178	26.16	+4.00
Turnout		512,853	49.06	+0.60
DMK hold		Swing	+2.68	
UPA gain from NDA		Swing		

General Election, 2004: Chennai South
Party	Candidate	Votes	%	±%
DMK	T.R.Baalu	564,578	60.37	+0.34
AIADMK	Bader Sayeed	343,838	36.77	n/a
Majority		220,740	23.60	−2.04
Turnout		935,143	47.96	+2.80
DMK hold		Swing	+0.34	
UPA gain from NDA		Swing		

General Election, 2004: Sriperumbudur
Party	Candidate	Votes	%	±%
DMK	A. Krishnaswamy	517,617	61.39	+9.63
AIADMK	Dr. Venugopal P.	282,271	33.48	−8.22
Independent	Vijayaragunathan M.	11,995	1.42	n/a
Independent	Balakrishnan K.	11,517	1.37	n/a
Majority		235,346	27.91	+17.84
Turnout		843,160	59.23	+4.21
DMK hold		Swing	+9.63	
UPA gain from NDA		Swing		

General Election, 2004: Chengalpattu
Party	Candidate	Votes	%	±%
PMK	A. K. Moorthy	431,643	56.85	+9.62
AIADMK	Ramachandran K.N.	282,919	37.26	−8.13
JP	Kumaresan A.	10,956	1.44	n/a
BSP	Nahamani J.	8,659	1.14	n/a
Majority		148,724	19.59	+17.76
Turnout		759,246	65.02	+6.69
PMK hold		Swing	+9.62	
UPA gain from NDA		Swing		

General Election, 2004: Arakkonam
Party	Candidate	Votes	%	±%
PMK	R. Velu	386,911	49.88	n/a
AIADMK	Shanmugam N.	284,715	36.70	n/a
JD(U)	Sethumadhavan S.	34,876	4.50	n/a
JP	Kulandaivelu M.	22,284	2.87	n/a
Independent	Venkatesan V.	9,646	1.24	n/a
Majority		102,196	13.17	+0.30
Turnout		775,745	66.86	+0.54
PMK gain from DMK		Swing	+49.88	
UPA gain from NDA		Swing		

Note: The incumbent party DMK did not contest this seat in 2004. Instead it was contested by its United Progressive Alliance coalition partner PMK, who won the seat. Thus, the UPA held the seat. PMK had not contested this seat in the previous 1999 elections.

General Election, 2004: Vellore
Party	Candidate	Votes	%	±%
DMK	K. M. Kader Mohideen	436,642	58.38	n/a
AIADMK	Santhanam A.	258,032	34.50	−8.03
JP	Paramasivam A.M.S.	11,309	1.51	n/a
BSP	Karunanithi E.	7,524	1.01	n/a
Majority		178,610	23.88	+20.23
Turnout		747,898	61.28	+0.31
DMK gain from PMK		Swing	+58.38	
UPA gain from NDA		Swing		

Note: The incumbent party PMK did not contest this seat in 2004. Instead it was contested by its United Progressive Alliance coalition partner DMK, who won the seat. Thus, the UPA held the seat. DMK had not contested this seat in the previous 1999 elections.

General Election, 2004: Tiruppattur
Party	Candidate	Votes	%	±%
DMK	D. Venugopal	453,786	58.43	+11.43
AIADMK	Subramani K.G.	272,884	35.14	−8.70
JD(U)	Irshad Ahamed H.S.	12,327	1.59	n/a
BSP	Rajendiran P.	8,284	1.07	n/a
Majority		180,902	23.29	+20.13
Turnout		776,597	63.99	−1.18
DMK hold		Swing	+11.43	
UPA gain from NDA		Swing		

General Election, 2004: Vandavasi
Party	Candidate	Votes	%	±%
MDMK	N. Ramachandran Gingee	394,903	56.12	n/a
AIADMK	Rajalakshmi R.	243,470	34.60	n/a
JD(U)	Punniyakotti P.	23,609	3.36	n/a
Independent	Vinayagam S.	14,473	2.06	n/a
Majority		151,433	21.52	+12.81
Turnout		703,669	62.35	+0.80
MDMK gain from PMK		Swing	+56.12	
UPA gain from NDA		Swing		

Note: The incumbent party PMK did not contest this seat in 2004. Instead it was contested by its United Progressive Alliance coalition partner MDMK, who won the seat. Thus, the UPA held the seat. MDMK had not contested this seat in the previous 1999 elections.

General Election, 2004: Tindivanam
Party	Candidate	Votes	%	±%
PMK	K. Dhanaraju	367,849	50.40	n/a
AIADMK	Arunmozhithevan. A	276,685	37.91	n/a
JD(U)	Gopalakrishnan. P	29,915	4.10	n/a
Independent	Mohamed Ali Jinna. M	10,987	1.51	+1.43
Independent	Perumal. S	8,083	1.11	n/a
Majority		91,164	12.49	+11.15
Turnout		729,863	62.98	+1.33
PMK gain from MDMK		Swing	+50.40	
UPA gain from NDA		Swing		

Note: The incumbent party MDMK did not contest this seat in 2004. Instead it was contested by its United Progressive Alliance coalition partner PMK, who won the seat. Thus, the UPA held the seat. PMK had not contested this seat in the previous 1999 elections.

General Election, 2004: Cuddalore
Party	Candidate	Votes	%	±%
DMK	K. Venkatapathy	400,059	52.63	+3.15
AIADMK	Rajendran. R	268,707	35.35	−3.92
JD(U)	Sarwar Khan. E	53,406	7.03	n/a
Independent	Veerapatran. P. M	13,664	1.80	n/a
Majority		131,352	17.28	+7.07
Turnout		760,187	62.99	−0.77
DMK hold		Swing	+3.15	
UPA gain from NDA		Swing		

General Election, 2004: Chidambaram
Party	Candidate	Votes	%	±%
PMK	E. Ponnuswamy	343,424	46.17	−0.95
JD(U)	Thirumaavalavan Thol	255,773	34.38	n/a
BJP	Periasamy. D	113,974	15.32	n/a
Majority		87,651	11.78	−4.53
Turnout		743,871	66.09	+0.07
PMK hold		Swing	-0.95	
UPA gain from NDA		Swing		

General Election, 2004: Dharmapuri
Party	Candidate	Votes	%	±%
PMK	R. Senthil	397,540	55.93	+9.27
BJP	P D Elangovan	181,450	25.53	n/a
JD(U)	Munusamy (Alais) Thamilselvan. M	62,960	8.86	n/a
Tamil Desiyak Katchi	Balasubramaniam. M	23,553	3.31	+1.64
Independent	Jaganathan. V. P	10,968	1.54	n/a
Independent	Mahendran. D	10,370	1.46%	+1.37
Majority		216,090	30.40%	+26.90
Turnout		710,736	54.86	−4.55
PMK hold		Swing	+9.27	
UPA gain from NDA		Swing		

General Election, 2004: Krishnagiri
Party	Candidate	Votes	%	±%
DMK	E. G. Sugavanam	403,297	54.51	+4.68
AIADMK	Nanje Gowdu. K	284,075	38.40	−6.87
BSP	Sanaulla Shariff. H	14,055	1.90	n/a
Independent	Syed Nikhar. A	11,830	1.60	n/a
Independent	Ameerjan. S	8,679	1.17	n/a
Majority		119,222	16.11	+11.55
Turnout		739,864	59.07	−0.91
DMK hold		Swing	+4.68	
UPA gain from NDA		Swing		

General Election, 2004: Rasipuram
Party	Candidate	Votes	%	±%
INC	K. Rani	384,170	55.20	n/a
AIADMK	S. Anbalagan	249,637	35.87	−11.54
JD(U)	Ayyasamy. S	24,522	3.52	n/a
Independent	Ravi. R	12,286	1.77	n/a
Majority		134,533	19.33	+13.36
Turnout		695,990	61.46	+6.09
INC gain from AIADMK		Swing	+55.20	
UPA gain from AIADMK		Swing		

Note: AIADMK, was not part of a coalition, in 1999 election, hence it is a gain for UPA.

General Election, 2004: Salem
Party	Candidate	Votes	%	±%
INC	K. V. Thangkabalu	444,591	59.93	n/a
AIADMK	Rajasekaran. A	268,964	36.26	−12.63
Independent	Shah Jahan. M A	8,466	1.14	n/a
Majority		175,627	23.67	+20.26
Turnout		741,847	59.29	+0.13
INC gain from AIADMK		Swing	+59.93	
UPA gain from AIADMK		Swing		

Note: AIADMK, was not part of a coalition, in 1999 election, hence it is a gain for UPA.

General Election, 2004: Tiruchengode
Party	Candidate	Votes	%	±%
DMK	Subbulakshmi Jagadeesan	501,569	58.00	n/a
AIADMK	Palaniswami. K	322,172	37.26	−10.58
Independent	Palanisamy. K	14,208	1.64	n/a
Majority		179,397	20.75	+20.21
Turnout		864,735	59.92	+4.51
DMK gain from MDMK		Swing	+58.00	
UPA gain from NDA		Swing		

Note: The incumbent party MDMK did not contest this seat in 2004. Instead it was contested by its United Progressive Alliance coalition partner DMK, who won the seat. Thus, the UPA held the seat. DMK had not contested this seat in the previous 1999 elections.

General Election, 2004: Nilgiris
Party	Candidate	Votes	%	±%
INC	R. Prabhu	494,121	63.26	+16.69
BJP	M. Master Mathan	257,619	32.98	−16.81
Independent	Pappannan. T. K	10,649	1.36	n/a
Majority		236,502	30.28	+27.05
Turnout		781,152	59.29	+4.21
INC gain from BJP		Swing	16.69	
UPA gain from NDA		Swing		

General Election, 2004: Gobichettipalayam
Party	Candidate	Votes	%	±%
INC	E. V. K. S. Elangovan	426,826	62.75	n/a
AIADMK	Govindarajar, N. R.	212,349	31.22	−15.33
Independent	Shaik Muhaideen, S.	15,356	2.26	n/a
Majority		214,477	31.53	+26.86
Turnout		680,240	64.64	+4.36
INC gain from AIADMK		Swing	+62.75	
UPA gain from AIADMK		Swing		

Note: AIADMK, was not part of a coalition, in 1999 election, hence it is a gain for UPA.

General Election, 2004: Coimbatore
Party	Candidate	Votes	%	±%
CPI	K. Subbarayan	504,981	57.43	+14.41
BJP	Radhakishnan. C. P	340,476	38.72	−10.48
Independent	Vellingiri. S	11,562	1.31	n/a
Majority		164,505	18.71	+12.52
Turnout		879,335	55.51	−0.12
CPI gain from BJP		Swing	+14.41	
Left Front (Tamil Nadu) gain from NDA		Swing		

General Election, 2004: Pollachi
Party	Candidate	Votes	%	±%
MDMK	Dr. C. Krishnan	364,988	56.76	+8.98
AIADMK	Murugan. G	244,067	37.95	−8.28
Independent	Rajkumar. R	13,039	2.03	+0.90
Independent	Ganesan. K M	6,503	1.01	−0.11
Majority		120,921	18.80	+17.25
Turnout		643,073	61.88	+4.79
MDMK hold		Swing	+8.98	
UPA gain from NDA		Swing		

General Election, 2004: Palani
Party	Candidate	Votes	%	±%
INC	S. K. Kharventhan	448,900	64.50	n/a
AIADMK	Kishore Kumar. K	217,407	31.24	−12.38
Independent	Jeyaprakash. P	11,337	1.63	n/a
Majority		231,493	33.26	+29.05
Turnout		696,007	63.92	+5.03
INC gain from AIADMK		Swing	+64.50	
UPA gain from AIADMK		Swing		

Note: AIADMK, was not part of a coalition, in 1999 election, hence it is a gain for UPA.

General Election, 2004: Dindigul
Party	Candidate	Votes	%	±%
INC	N. S. V. Chitthan	407,116	58.92	n/a
AIADMK	Jeyaraman. M	251,945	36.46	−6.48
Independent	Ravindran. J	10,359	1.50	+1.47
Majority		155,171	22.46	+19.49
Turnout		690,973	60.75	+3.29
INC gain from AIADMK		Swing	+58.92	
UPA gain from AIADMK		Swing		

Note: AIADMK, was not part of a coalition, in 1999 election, hence it is a gain for UPA.

General Election, 2004: Madurai
Party	Candidate	Votes	%	±%
CPI(M)	P. Mohan	414,433	56.01	+12.22
AIADMK	A. K. Bose	281,593	38.06	n/a
JD(U)	Sakthivel, P.	12,093	1.63	n/a
JP	Subramanian Swamy	12,009	1.62	−1.11
Majority		132,840	17.95	+12.99
Turnout		739,937	55.05	+2.64
CPI(M) hold		Swing	+12.22	
Left Front (Tamil Nadu) hold		Swing		

General Election, 2004: Periyakulam
Party	Candidate	Votes	%	±%
INC	J. M. Aaron Rashid	346,851	49.51	n/a
AIADMK	T.T.V. Dhinakaran	325,696	46.49	+0.85
Majority		21,155	3.02	−3.86
Turnout		700,603	66.29	+6.93
INC gain from AIADMK		Swing	+49.51	
UPA gain from AIADMK		Swing		

Note: AIADMK, was not part of a coalition, in 1999 election, hence it is a gain for UPA.

General Election, 2004: Karur
Party	Candidate	Votes	%	±%
DMK	K. C. Palanisamy	450,407	60.43	+15.42
AIADMK	Palanichamy, Raja. N	259,531	34.82	−10.57
Independent	Jawahar. N	14,552	1.95	n/a
Majority		190,876	25.61	+25.22
Turnout		745,342	69.70	+6.76
DMK gain from AIADMK		Swing	+15.42	
UPA gain from AIADMK		Swing		

Note: AIADMK, was not part of a coalition, in 1999 election, hence it is a gain for UPA.

General Election, 2004: Tiruchirappalli
Party	Candidate	Votes	%	±%
MDMK	L. Ganesan	450,907	63.59	n/a
AIADMK	Paranjothi. M	234,182	33.02	n/a
Independent	Ravi. P	7,831	1.10	n/a
Majority		216,725	30.56	+17.87
Turnout		709,134	59.48	+3.08
MDMK gain from BJP		Swing	+63.59	
UPA gain from NDA		Swing		

General Election, 2004: Perambalur
Party	Candidate	Votes	%	±%
DMK	A. Raja	389,708	55.01	+7.50
AIADMK	Dr. M. Sundaram	236,375	33.37	−4.36
JD(U)	Ganesan. V	47,041	6.64	n/a
Independent	Jaisankar. K	15,935	2.25	n/a
JP	Dr. M. Thatchanamoorthy	7,470	1.05	n/a
Majority		153,333	21.64	+11.87
Turnout		708,434	70.88	+5.48
DMK hold		Swing	+7.50	
UPA gain from NDA		Swing		

General Election, 2004: Mayiladuthurai
Party	Candidate	Votes	%	±%
INC	Mani Shankar Aiyar	411,160	59.08	+9.60
AIADMK	O. S. Manian	215,469	30.96	n/a
JD(U)	Rajan J.	49,124	7.06	n/a
Independent	Rahmathullah U.	8,335	1.20	n/a
Majority		195,691	28.12	+22.00
Turnout		695,889	68.09	+4.48
INC hold		Swing	+9.60	
UPA hold		Swing		

General Election, 2004: Nagapattinam
Party	Candidate	Votes	%	±%
DMK	A. K. S. Vijayan	463,389	61.66	+12.50
AIADMK	Archunan. P J	247,166	32.89	n/a
JD(U)	Ramesh. S G M	17,090	2.27	n/a
Independent	Murugesan. K	9,480	1.26	n/a
Majority		216,223	28.77	+25.54
Turnout		751,581	71.65	+5.63
DMK hold		Swing	+12.50	
UPA gain from NDA		Swing		

General Election, 2004: Thanjavur
Party	Candidate	Votes	%	±%
DMK	S. S. Palanimanickam	400,986	56.56	+11.97
AIADMK	Thangamuthu. K	281,838	39.75	+0.15
Independent	Shahul Hameed. A. R.	10,606	1.50	n/a
Majority		119,148	16.81	+11.82
Turnout		708,971	68.78	+5.72
DMK hold		Swing	+11.97	
UPA gain from NDA		Swing		

General Election, 2004: Pudukkottai
Party	Candidate	Votes	%	±%
DMK	S. Regupathy	466,133	56.82	n/a
AIADMK	Ravichandran. A	309,637	37.75	n/a
BSP	Nagooran. A	10,024	1.22	n/a
Independent	M. S. Lion Rajendran	9,723	1.19	n/a
Majority		156,496	19.08	+10.84
Turnout		820,300	66.42	+2.32
DMK gain from MADMK		Swing	+56.82	
UPA gain from NDA		Swing		

Note: The incumbent party MADMK did not contest this seat in 2004. Instead it was contested by its coalition partner from the previous 1999 elections - DMK. Also, this is a gain for the UPA, since MADMK, the incumbent was part of the NDA coalition, while DMK left the NDA for UPA

General Election, 2004: Sivaganga
Party	Candidate	Votes	%	±%
INC	P. Chidambaram	400,393	60.00	+20.57
AIADMK	Karuppiah. S P	237,668	34.60	n/a
Independent	Subramanian Mutharaiyar. M Arimalam	9,709	1.46	n/a
Majority		162,725	24.39	+20.57
Turnout		703,669	62.35	+0.80
INC hold		Swing	+20.57	
UPA hold		Swing		

General Election, 2004: Ramanathapuram
Party	Candidate	Votes	%	±%
DMK	M. S. K. Bhavani Rajenthiran	335,287	49.66	+9.32
AIADMK	Murugesan. C	225,337	33.38	−8.00
JD(U)	Kannappan. S	79,507	11.78	n/a
Independent	Veeraya. T	6,858	1.02	n/a
Majority		109,950	16.29	+15.25
Turnout		675,157	58.83	+1.34
DMK gain from AIADMK		Swing	+9.32	
UPA gain from AIADMK		Swing		

Note: AIADMK, was not part of a coalition, in 1999 election, hence it is a gain for UPA.

General Election, 2004: Sivakasi
Party	Candidate	Votes	%	±%
MDMK	A. Ravichandran	469,072	56.44	+15.23
AIADMK	Kannan. P	304,555	36.64	+4.89
JD(U)	Dheepa Valentina. T	27,130	3.26	n/a
Independent	Venkatesan. K	10,156	1.22	n/a
Majority		164,517	19.79	+10.34
Turnout		831,167	63.27	+0.41
MDMK hold		Swing	+15.23	
UPA gain from NDA		Swing		

General Election, 2004: Tirunelveli
Party	Candidate	Votes	%	±%
INC	R. Dhanuskodi Athithan	370,127	58.39	n/a
AIADMK	R. Amirtha Ganesan	203,052	32.03	−8.88
JD(U)	M. Appavu	39,333	6.21	n/a
Majority		167,075	26.36	+22.02
Turnout		633,846	58.35	+3.89
INC gain from AIADMK		Swing	+58.39	
UPA gain from AIADMK		Swing		

Note: AIADMK, was not part of a coalition, in 1999 election, hence it is a gain for UPA.

General Election, 2004: Tenkasi
Party	Candidate	Votes	%	±%
CPI	M. Appadurai	348,000	48.85	n/a
AIADMK	S. Murugesan	225,824	31.70	−3.62
JD(U)	Dr. K. Krishnasamy	101,122	14.19	n/a
Independent	M. Vadivel Kumar	14,441	2.03	n/a
Majority		122,176	17.15	+17.02
Turnout		712,409	65.68	+0.80
CPI gain from AIADMK		Swing	+48.85	
Left Front (Tamil Nadu) gain from AIADMK		Swing		

General Election, 2004: Tiruchendur
Party	Candidate	Votes	%	±%
DMK	V. Radhika Selvi	394,484	62.50	+18.89
AIADMK	T. Thamodaran	212,803	33.72	+1.05
Majority		181,681	28.79	+17.83
Turnout		631,124	61.18	+8.83
DMK hold		Swing	+18.89	
UPA gain from NDA		Swing		

General Election, 2004: Nagercoil
Party	Candidate	Votes	%	±%
CPI(M)	A. V. Bellarmin	410,091	60.87	n/a
BJP	P. Radhakrishnan	245,797	36.48	−12.94
Majority		164,294	24.39	+0.97
Turnout		673,716	60.69	+1.90
CPI(M) gain from BJP		Swing	+60.87	
Left Front (Tamil Nadu) gain from NDA		Swing		
