= 2004 Stratford-on-Avon District Council election =

2004 UK local government election

Results of the 2004 Stratford-on-Avon District Council election

The 2004 Stratford-on-Avon District Council election took place on 10 June 2004 to elect members of Stratford-on-Avon District Council in Warwickshire, England. One third of the council was up for election and the Conservative Party stayed in overall control of the council.

After the election, the composition of the council was

- Conservative 30
- Liberal Democrat 20
- Independent 3

== Background ==
19 of the 53 seats on the council were contested in the election. The Conservatives were defending 11 of the seats and this was seen as giving the Liberal Democrats a chance at taking over control of the council, which had a one-seat Conservative majority before the election. Meanwhile, Labour had their only remaining council seat up for election in Southam ward, leading to the possibility that they could fail to be represented on the council after the election.

== Election result ==
The results saw the Conservatives strengthen their majority on the council up to 7 seats. They gained 4 seats in Harbury, Southam, Stratford Guild and Hathaway and Wellesbourne wards and only suffered 1 loss to the Liberal Democrats in Studley. While the Liberal Democrats lost ground as a result, the defeat in Southam meant Labour was no longer represented on the council.

The Conservatives said they were pleased with the results, that saw them win almost half of the vote, and which they put down to a strong positive campaign. Overall turnout in the election was higher than the national average at 43.5%.

Stratford-on-Avon local election result 2004
Party	Seats	Gains	Losses	Net gain/loss	Seats %	Votes %	Votes	+/−
Conservative	14	4	1	+3	73.7	49.9	14,264	+10.3%
Liberal Democrats	4	1	3	-2	21.1	39.2	11,192	-6.3%
Independent	1	0	0	0	5.3	6.2	1,780	-4.3%
Labour	0	0	1	-1	0	4.7	1,347	+0.6%

== Ward results ==
Alcester
Party	Candidate	Votes	%	±%
Liberal Democrats	Clifford Meade	1,054	57.6	−1.7
Conservative	Maurice Abney-Hastings	665	36.4	−4.3
Labour	Matthew Stephens	110	6.0	+6.0
Majority		389	21.3	+2.7
Turnout		1,829	39.8	+2.7
Liberal Democrats hold		Swing		

Aston Cantlow
Party	Candidate	Votes	%	±%
Conservative	William Lawrence	479	61.1	+6.0
Liberal Democrats	Shahid Juned	305	38.9	−6.0
Majority		174	22.2	+12.0
Turnout		784	52.9	
Conservative hold		Swing		

Bardon
Party	Candidate	Votes	%	±%
Conservative	John Winterburn	435	64.9	+4.7
Liberal Democrats	John Insoll	235	35.1	+3.8
Majority		200	29.9	+1.0
Turnout		670	43.0	
Conservative hold		Swing		

Bidford and Salford
Party	Candidate	Votes	%	±%
Independent	Kim James	997	56.0	+56.0
Independent	John Sandle	783	44.0	+44.0
Majority		214	12.0	
Turnout		1,780	36.0	+8.5
Independent hold		Swing		

Burton Dassett
Party	Candidate	Votes	%	±%
Conservative	Simon Jackson	536	65.8	−4.4
Liberal Democrats	Sarah Evans	279	34.2	+4.4
Majority		257	31.5	−8.9
Turnout		815	49.6	
Conservative hold		Swing		

Claverdon
Party	Candidate	Votes	%	±%
Conservative	Jane Harrison	625	73.3	−8.5
Liberal Democrats	Jeanne Lowe	228	26.7	+8.5
Majority		397	46.5	−17.1
Turnout		853	47.3	
Conservative hold		Swing		

Ettington
Party	Candidate	Votes	%	±%
Conservative	Isobel Seccombe	578	65.4	+9.8
Liberal Democrats	Adrian Brabyn	306	34.6	−9.8
Majority		272	30.8	+19.6
Turnout		884	49.7	
Conservative hold		Swing		

Harbury
Party	Candidate	Votes	%	±%
Conservative	Eric Dally	847	52.4	
Liberal Democrats	Jean Booth	770	47.6	
Majority		77	4.8	
Turnout		1,617	43.4	
Conservative gain from Liberal Democrats		Swing		

Henley
Party	Candidate	Votes	%	±%
Conservative	Stephen Thirlwell	1,052	70.3	+12.4
Liberal Democrats	Mark Edwards	444	29.7	−12.4
Majority		608	40.6	+24.8
Turnout		1,496	43.4	+10.7
Conservative hold		Swing		

Kineton
Party	Candidate	Votes	%	±%
Liberal Democrats	Alan Higgs	920	58.9	+6.7
Conservative	Richard Hurley	643	41.1	−6.7
Majority		277	17.7	+13.2
Turnout		1,563	47.2	+6.7
Liberal Democrats hold		Swing		

Shipston
Party	Candidate	Votes	%	±%
Conservative	Trevor Russell	897	53.6	+10.7
Liberal Democrats	Stephen Troup	778	46.4	−10.7
Majority		119	7.2	
Turnout		1,675	45.3	+2.3
Conservative hold		Swing		

Southam
Party	Candidate	Votes	%	±%
Conservative	John Appleton	774	47.3	+5.2
Labour	James Taylor	632	38.7	−2.6
Liberal Democrats	Stuart Ritchie	229	14.0	−2.6
Majority		142	8.7	+7.9
Turnout		1,635	33.2	+1.8
Conservative gain from Labour		Swing		

Stratford Alveston
Party	Candidate	Votes	%	±%
Conservative	Lynda Organ	1,162	56.7	+13.0
Liberal Democrats	Joan McFarlane	886	43.3	+6.3
Majority		276	13.5	+6.8
Turnout		2,048	49.1	+7.4
Conservative hold		Swing		

Stratford Avenue and New Town
Party	Candidate	Votes	%	±%
Conservative	Juliet Short	939	52.3	+27.9
Liberal Democrats	Ronald Tredwell	684	38.1	+2.3
Labour	Karen Parnell	172	9.6	+5.6
Majority		255	14.2	
Turnout		1,795	36.4	+2.3
Conservative hold		Swing		

Stratford Guild and Hathaway
Party	Candidate	Votes	%	±%
Conservative	Michael Perry	1,169	49.9	+18.6
Liberal Democrats	William Dowling	981	41.8	+4.2
Labour	Doreen Wright	195	8.3	+0.9
Majority		188	8.1	
Turnout		2,345	43.2	+5.3
Conservative gain from Liberal Democrats		Swing		

Stratford Mount Pleasant
Party	Candidate	Votes	%	±%
Liberal Democrats	Charles Bates	756	62.9	+2.3
Conservative	Laura Main	359	29.9	+29.9
Labour	Ewan Wainwright	86	7.2	+2.6
Majority		397	33.1	+7.3
Turnout		1,201	36.4	−1.4
Liberal Democrats hold		Swing		

Studley
Party	Candidate	Votes	%	±%
Liberal Democrats	Paul Beaman	972	50.5	−7.7
Conservative	William McCarthy	802	41.6	−0.2
Labour	Michael Gerrard	152	7.9	+7.9
Majority		170	8.8	−7.6
Turnout		1,926	42.2	+12.0
Liberal Democrats gain from Conservative		Swing		

Tanworth
Party	Candidate	Votes	%	±%
Conservative	Mark Flower	1,037	81.7	
Liberal Democrats	Karyl Rees	233	18.3	
Majority		804	63.3	
Turnout		1,270	41.9	
Conservative hold		Swing		

Wellesbourne
Party	Candidate	Votes	%	±%
Conservative	Anita MacAulay	1,265	52.8	+17.8
Liberal Democrats	Priscilla Cook	1,132	47.2	+6.4
Majority		133	5.5	
Turnout		2,397	45.7	+6.7
Conservative gain from Liberal Democrats		Swing		
