= 2004 Alsace regional election =

A regional election took place in Alsace on 21 March and 28 March 2004, along with all other regions. Adrien Zeller (UMP) was re-elected President, defeating Jacques Bigot (PS).

Candidate	Party	First round		Second round		Seats
Candidate	Party	Votes	%	Votes	%	Seats
Adrien Zeller *	UMP-UDF	225,193	34.06%	299,353	43.56%	27
Jacques Bigot	PS-LV	133,038	20.12%	236,709	34.44%	12
Patrick Binder	FN	122,860	18.58%	151,187	22.00%	8
Robert Spieler	ADA	62,253	9.42%	-	-	-
Antoine Waechter	MEI	48.949	7.40%	-	-	-
Alfred Wahl	PCF-PRG-MRC	24,692	3.73%	-	-	-
Patrick Merck	DIV	23,540	3.56%	-	-	-
Françoise Ruch	LCR-LO	20,004	3.03%	-	-	-
Pascale Grauss	PF	578	0.09%	-	-	-
Total		661,107	100,00%	687,249	100,00%	47
