= 2004 Sacramento mayoral election =

Sacramento mayoral election, 2004
- March 2, 2004
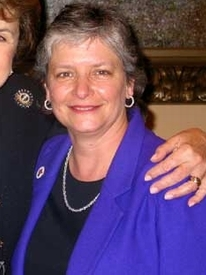

Candidate	Heather Fargo	Ross W. Relles Jr.
Party	Democratic	Nonpartisan
Popular vote	40,823	17,437
Percentage	59.8%	20.9%
Candidate	Mark R. Soble	J. Leonard Padilla
Party	Nonpartisan	Nonpartisan
Popular vote	9,617	6,484
Percentage	11.5%	7.8%
Mayor before election
Heather Fargo
Democratic
Elected mayor
Heather Fargo
Democratic

The 2004 Sacramento mayoral election was held on March 2, 2004, to elect the mayor of Sacramento, California. It saw the reelection of Heather Fargo. Since Fargo won a majority in the first round, no runoff was required.

== Results ==
Sacramento mayoral election, 2004
Candidate	Votes	%
Heather Fargo (incumbent)	40,823	59.8
Ross W. Relles Jr.	17,437	20.9
Mark R. Soble	9,617	11.5
J. Leonard Padilla	6,484	7.8
