= 2003 Iwate gubernatorial election =

Japanese gubernatorial election

Iwate Prefecture held a gubernatorial election on April 13, 2003. Incumbent governor Hiroya Masuda was re-elected.

Gubernatorial election 2003: Iwate
Party	Candidate	Votes	%	±%
Independent	Hiroya Masuda (増田 寛也)	669,527		
JCP	Norikatsu Sugawara (菅原 則勝)	89,692		
Turnout		766,750	68.71	

== Sources ==
- National Election Administration Committee
