= 2004 Rhône-Alpes regional election =

A regional election took place in Rhône-Alpes on 21 March and 28 March 2004, along with all other regions. Jean-Jack Queyranne (PS) was elected president, defeating the incumbent Anne-Marie Comparini (UDF).

Party leader	Party list	First round		Second round		Seats	
Party leader	Party list	#	%	#	%	#	%
Jean-Jack Queyranne	PS-PRG-PCF	688,718	32.19	1,083,755	46.52	94	59.9
Gérard Leras	The Greens	215,783	10.09	1,083,755	46.52	94	59.9
Anne-Marie Comparini	UDF-UMP-CAP21-FRS	667,856	31.22	889,815	38.20	45	28.7
Bruno Gollnisch	FN	389,565	18.21	355,864	15.28	18	11.5
Roseline Vachetta	LO-LCR	95,524	4.47	Eliminated in the first round			
Patrick Bertrand	GRAD-Union of Radical Republicans (U2R)	46,611	2.18	Eliminated in the first round			
Norbert Chetail	MNR	35,310	1.65	Eliminated in the first round			
Total		2,139,367	100.00	2,329,434	100.00		
