= 2004 European Parliament election in Lombardy =

The 2004 European Parliament election took place on 12–13 June 2004.

The Olive Tree was the most voted list in Lombardy with 26.3%, followed by Forza Italia (25.7%) and Lega Lombarda–Lega Nord (13.8%).

== Results ==
Party	votes	votes (%)
The Olive Tree: Democracy is Freedom – The Daisy; Democrats of the Left; Italian Democratic Socialists; European Republicans Movement	1,432,952	26.3
Forza Italia	1,395,718	25.7
Lega Nord	750,842	13.8
National Alliance	391,668	7.2
Communist Refoundation Party	304,351	5.6
Union of Christian and Centre Democrats	197,662	3.6
Bonino List	149,124	2.8
Federation of the Greens	121,420	2.2
Pensioners' Party	105,965	2.0
Party of Italian Communists	101,079	1.9
Italy of Values–Civil Society–Occhetto	90,763	1.7
United Socialists for Europe	70,660	1.3
LAL–LFV–UfS	65,925	1.2
Social Alternative	54,482	1.0
Others	199,378	3.6
Total	5,423,989	100.0

Source: Ministry of the Interior
