= Jean-Claude Étienne =

French politician

Member of the National Assembly for Marne's 2nd constituency
- In office 2 April 1993 – 30 September 2001
- Preceded by: Georges Colin
- Succeeded by: Catherine Vautrin

Personal details
- Born: 6 August 1941 Vouziers, Ardennes, France
- Died: 11 March 2017 (aged 75) Paris, France
- Party: RPR
- Profession: Professor of Medicine

Jean-Claude Étienne (French pronunciation: [ʒɑ̃ klod etjɛn]; 6 August 1941, Vouziers (Ardennes) – 11 March 2017) was a French politician, and a member of the Senate of France. He represented the Marne department and is a member of the Union for a Popular Movement Party.

== Biography ==
Professor of medicine by profession, he was elected Senator of the Marne on 23 September 2001 after being member of the second district of the Marne.

On 27 October 2010, he was appointed member of the group of electable individuals to the French Economic, Social and Environmental Council (CESE). He was replaced in the French Senate by Mireille Oudit, from 3 November 2010.

== Local mandates ==
- 1986 - 1998 : Regional Councillor Champagne-Ardenne
- 1995 - in 2001 : Councillor of Reims
- 1996 - 1998 : Senior Vice President of Regional Council of Champagne-Ardenne
- 1998 - 2004 : Chairman of the Regional Council of Champagne-Ardenne
- 2004 - 2010 : Regional Council of Champagne-Ardenne

== Parliamentary seats ==
- 2 April 1993 - 30 September 2001 : Representative (RPR) of the second district of the Marne
- 1 October 2001 - 2 November 2010 : Senator (RPR and UMP) of the Marne

== Other functions ==
- Senior Vice President of the Parliamentary Office for Science and Technology
- Member of the High Council for Biotechnology
- Member of the group of electable individuals to the CESE

== Honors and awards ==
Knight of the Order of Legion of Honour (2011)

== Bibliography ==
- Page on the Senate website
