= 2004 European Parliament election in Sardinia =

The European Parliament election of 2004 took place on 12–13 June 2004.

The Olive Tree was the most voted list in Sardinia with 23.5%, followed by Forza Italia (21.9%).

== Results ==
Parties	votes	votes (%)
The Olive Tree: Democracy is Freedom – The Daisy; Democrats of the Left; Italian Democratic Socialists; European Republicans Movement	209,723	23.5
Forza Italia	195,192	21.9
National Alliance	112,364	12.6
Segni-Scognamiglio Pact	66,257	7.4
Communist Refoundation Party	65,528	7.4
Union of Christian and Centre Democrats	58,977	6.5
Party of Italian Communists	37,524	4.2
Italy of Values	23,834	2.7
Bonino List	22,562	2.5
United Socialists for Europe	22,053	2.5
Federation of the Greens	16,408	1.8
Sardinian Action Party	13,112	1.5
Popular Alliance – UDEUR	9,431	1.1
Pensioners' Party	8,768	1.0
Social Alternative	8,605	1.0
Others	21,535	2.4
Total	890,973	100.0

Source: Ministry of the Interior
