= 2004 Botswana local elections =

Local elections in Botswana were held on 30 October 2004 for the district councils of the Districts of Botswana. Local government is administered by nine district and five town councils. District commissioners have executive authority.

== Overall Results ==
| Party | Seats | +/- |
|---|---|---|
| Botswana Democratic Party | 336 | ▲33 |
| Botswana National Front | 105 | ▲25 |
| Botswana Congress Party | 32 | ▲19 |
| Botswana Alliance Movement | 9 | 0 |
| Botswana People's Party | 3 | ▲3 |
| Independents | 3 | ▲3 |
| Total | 490 | ▲85 |
| Registered Voters | 550,413 | |
| Total Voters (Voter Turnout) | 419,503 (76.2%) | |
| Invalid Votes | 8,570 | |
| Total Valid Votes | 410,933 | |

== Results By District ==
=== Central District ===
| Party | Seats | +/- |
|---|---|---|
| Botswana Democratic Party | 128 | ▲24 |
| Botswana Congress Party | 6 | ▲5 |
| Botswana National Front | 4 | ▲4 |
| Botswana Alliance Movement | 1 | 0 |
| Independents | 1 | 0 |
| Total | 140 | ▲34 |
| Registered Voters | 153,774 | |
| Total Voters (Voter Turnout) | 111,664 (72.6%) | |
| Invalid Votes | 3,191 | |
| Total Valid Votes | 108,473 | |

The election in one ward was postponed due to the death of a candidate. The Botswana Democratic Party (BDP) won the seat in a by-election held on 4 December 2004, bringing their total to 128 seats.

=== Francistown City ===
| Party | Seats | +/- |
|---|---|---|
| Botswana Democratic Party | 16 | ▲2 |
| Botswana Congress Party | 2 | ▲2 |
| Botswana People's Party | 1 | ▲1 |
| Total | 19 | ▲3 |
| Registered Voters | 26,172 | |
| Total Voters (Voter Turnout) | 17,534 (67.0%) | |
| Invalid Votes | 277 | |
| Total Valid Votes | 17,257 | |

Elections in one ward were postponed because the party symbol for one of the contestants was erroneously omitted. The Botswana People's Party (BPP) won the seat in a by-election held on 4 December 2004, giving it one seat.

=== Gaborone City ===
| Party | Seats | +/- |
|---|---|---|
| Botswana National Front | 16 | ▼2 |
| Botswana Democratic Party | 11 | ▲4 |
| Botswana Congress Party | 3 | ▲3 |
| Total | 30 | ▲5 |
| Registered Voters | 46,246 | |
| Total Voters (Voter Turnout) | 35,037 (75.8%) | |
| Invalid Votes | 180 | |
| Total Valid Votes | 34,857 | |

=== Ghanzi District ===
| Party | Seats | +/- |
|---|---|---|
| Botswana Democratic Party | 13 | ▼2 |
| Botswana National Front | 7 | ▲4 |
| Total | 20 | ▲2 |
| Registered Voters | 14,294 | |
| Total Voters (Voter Turnout) | 11,597 (81.1%) | |
| Invalid Votes | 374 | |
| Total Valid Votes | 11,223 | |

=== Jwaneng ===
| Party | Seats | +/- |
|---|---|---|
| Botswana National Front | 7 | 0 |
| Total | 7 | 0 |
| Registered Voters | 5,226 | |
| Total Voters (Voter Turnout) | 4,012 (76.8%) | |
| Invalid Votes | 36 | |
| Total Valid Votes | 3,976 | |

=== Kgalagadi District ===
| Party | Seats | +/- |
|---|---|---|
| Botswana Democratic Party | 13 | 0 |
| Botswana National Front | 9 | ▲2 |
| Total | 22 | ▲2 |
| Registered Voters | 18,070 | |
| Total Voters (Voter Turnout) | 15,153 (83.9%) | |
| Invalid Votes | 254 | |
| Total Valid Votes | 14,899 | |

=== Kgatleng District ===
| Party | Seats | +/- |
|---|---|---|
| Botswana Democratic Party | 10 | ▼2 |
| Botswana National Front | 8 | ▲2 |
| Botswana Congress Party | 5 | ▲2 |
| Total | 23 | ▲2 |
| Registered Voters | 28,064 | |
| Total Voters (Voter Turnout) | 22,135 (78.9%) | |
| Invalid Votes | 347 | |
| Total Valid Votes | 21,788 | |

=== Kweneng District ===
| Party | Seats | +/- |
|---|---|---|
| Botswana Democratic Party | 47 | ▲5 |
| Botswana National Front | 17 | ▲10 |
| Botswana Congress Party | 2 | ▲1 |
| Total | 66 | ▲16 |
| Registered Voters | 74,279 | |
| Total Voters (Voter Turnout) | 57,103 (76.9%) | |
| Invalid Votes | 1,048 | |
| Total Valid Votes | 56,055 | |

=== Lobatse ===
| Party | Seats | +/- |
|---|---|---|
| Botswana National Front | 8 | ▼1 |
| Botswana Democratic Party | 4 | ▲2 |
| Total | 12 | ▲1 |
| Registered Voters | 10,953 | |
| Total Voters (Voter Turnout) | 8,054 (73.5%) | |
| Invalid Votes | 136 | |
| Total Valid Votes | 7,918 | |

=== North-East District ===
| Party | Seats | +/- |
|---|---|---|
| Botswana Democratic Party | 16 | ▲1 |
| Botswana People's Party | 3 | ▲3 |
| Botswana Alliance Movement | 0 | ▼2 |
| Total | 19 | ▲2 |
| Registered Voters | 17,739 | |
| Total Voters (Voter Turnout) | 13,551 (76.4%) | |
| Invalid Votes | 162 | |
| Total Valid Votes | 13,389 | |

=== North-West District ===
| Party | Seats | +/- |
|---|---|---|
| Botswana Democratic Party | 31 | ▲1 |
| Botswana Alliance Movement | 8 | ▲4 |
| Botswana Congress Party | 5 | ▼1 |
| Botswana National Front | 1 | 0 |
| Independents | 1 | ▲1 |
| Total | 46 | ▲6 |
| Registered Voters | 51,376 | |
| Total Voters (Voter Turnout) | 40,346 (78.5%) | |
| Invalid Votes | 907 | |
| Total Valid Votes | 39,439 | |

=== Selibe Phikwe ===
| Party | Seats | +/- |
|---|---|---|
| Botswana Democratic Party | 9 | ▼2 |
| Botswana Congress Party | 5 | ▲2 |
| Total | 14 | ▲1 |
| Registered Voters | 17,306 | |
| Total Voters (Voter Turnout) | 13,871 (80.2%) | |
| Invalid Votes | 113 | |
| Total Valid Votes | 13,758 | |

=== South-East District ===
| Party | Seats | +/- |
|---|---|---|
| Botswana Democratic Party | 12 | ▼1 |
| Botswana National Front | 5 | 0 |
| Botswana Congress Party | 3 | ▲3 |
| Total | 20 | ▲2 |
| Registered Voters | 19,721 | |
| Total Voters (Voter Turnout) | 15,828 (80.3%) | |
| Invalid Votes | 368 | |
| Total Valid Votes | 15,460 | |

=== Southern District ===
| Party | Seats | +/- |
|---|---|---|
| Botswana Democratic Party | 26 | 0 |
| Botswana National Front | 24 | ▲6 |
| Botswana Congress Party | 1 | ▲1 |
| Independents | 1 | 0 |
| Total | 52 | ▲6 |
| Registered Voters | 67,223 | |
| Total Voters (Voter Turnout) | 53,618 (79.8%) | |
| Invalid Votes | 1,177 | |
| Total Valid Votes | 52,441 | |

There was a tie in one constituency and a re-election was held on 8 January 2005. The Botswana National Front (BNF) candidate won, bringing their total to 24 seats.
